= List of Righteous Among the Nations by country =

This is a partial list of some of the most prominent Righteous Among the Nations per country of origin, recognized by Yad Vashem, the Holocaust Martyrs' and Heroes' Remembrance Authority in Jerusalem. These people risked their lives or their liberty and position to help Jews during The Holocaust; some suffered death as a result. As of 1 January 2021, Yad Vashem has recognized 27,921 Righteous Among the Nations from 51 countries.

== By country ==
These figures are not necessarily an indication of the actual number of Jews saved in each country, but reflect material on rescue operations made available to Yad Vashem as of 1 January 2019.

Country of origin	Awards	Notes
Poland	7,177	The largest contingent. It includes a wide variety of both individuals of different occupations and organized activists, including Irena Sendler (Polish social worker who served in Polish Underground and Żegota resistance organization in Warsaw, saving 2,500 Jewish children); Jan Karski (who reported on the situation of Jews in occupied Poland); Tadeusz Pankiewicz (Kraków pharmacist), Henryk Sławik (social worker); Rudolf Weigl (scientist); Stefan Korboński (politician), Sister Bertranda (Catholic nun); Eryk Lipiński (artist); Franciszek and Magdalena Banasiewicz (painter and his wife); Irena Adamowicz (scout leader); Maria Kotarba (Polish Resistance fighter); the Podgórski sisters (store clerks); Józef and Wiktoria Ulma (family of farmers murdered together with their six children for helping Jews); Leopold "Poldek" Socha (sewer inspector, hid a group of Jews in remote corner of Lviv sewers); writer and activist Zofia Kossak-Szczucka; and Karolina Juszczykowska (kitchen worker for Organization Todt, hid Jews in her home for which she was executed). See Polish Righteous Among the Nations for additional names. Poland was among the occupied countries where helping Jews or even not reporting them to German authorities could be punished with death. This law also applied to Belarusians, Ukrainians and Serbs.
Netherlands	5,910	On a population of 9 million in 1940 the figure represents the largest per capita number: 1 in 1,700 Dutch was awarded (Poland: 1 in 3,700; population of 24,300,000 ethnic Poles in 1939). Includes two persons originally from the Dutch East Indies (now Indonesia) and one person from Suriname (William Arnold Egger). Includes Corrie ten Boom; Frits Philips, who ran Philips during the German occupation; Gertruida Wijsmuller-Meier, who helped save about 10,000 Jewish children from Germany and Austria just before the outbreak of the war (Kindertransport); she also managed the last transport to the UK on 12 May 1940, on the last ship leaving the Netherlands; Jan Zwartendijk, who as a Dutch consular representative in Kaunas, Lithuania, issued exit visas used by between 6,000 and to 10,000 Jewish refugees; includes the people who hid and helped Anne Frank and her family, like Miep Gies. Also includes the Salvation Army major Alida Bosshardt and the founder of VPRO Radio, theologian Nicolette Bruining. Remarkable is the relatively large number of Protestant ministers and their wives who participated and were awarded. Also includes the German lawyer Hans Georg Calmeyer, who was recognized for his activities in the Netherlands during the war. Also includes Hendrika Gerritsen, a member of the Dutch Resistance who hid Siegfried Goldsteen and Judith Fransman in her home in 1943 and transported forged papers for people in hiding on behalf of the Amsterdam Resistance, and Caecilia Loots, a teacher and antifascist resistance member, known for saving Jewish children during the war. Marion van Binsbergen helped save approximately 150 Dutch Jews, most of them children, throughout the German occupation of the Netherlands. Tina Strobos, rescued over 100 Jews by hiding them in her house and providing them with forged paperwork to escape the country. Also includes famous author and television personality Godfried Bomans and Frisian writer and poet Tiny Mulder (fy). Henk Zanoli returned his medal in 2014 after some of his family members were killed in an IDF airstrike in Gaza. Also uniquely includes three organisations or collectives: the collective participants of the so-called "Amsterdam dock strike" (better known as the February strike, about 30,000 to 50,000 people who on 25 and 26 February 1941 took part in the first strike against persecution of the Jews in Nazi-occupied Europe); the whole village of Nieuwlande (117 inhabitants) that set up a quota-system under then alderman and later resistance fighter Johannes Post; and the resistance group Naamloze Vennootschap for saving Jewish children. In Denmark, France, and Norway, as well, a group of people was recognized as a single entity.
France	4,150	In January 2007, French President Jacques Chirac and other dignitaries honored France's Righteous in a ceremony at the Panthéon, Paris. The Legion of Honour was awarded to 160 French Righteous for their efforts saving French Jews during World War II. Also includes Johan Hendrik Weidner, head of the Dutch-Paris organisation, which saved over 800 Jews and over 100 Allied airmen.
Ukraine	2,673	Including Daniil Tymchina, hieromonk of the Univ Lavra (2008); Klymentiy Sheptytsky, the Archimandrite of the Studite monks of Greek-Catholic Monastery (1995); Stepan Omelianiuk (1982)
Belgium	1,774	Including Queen Elisabeth of the Belgians. Also includes Jeanne Daman, who helped rescue two thousand Jewish children from the Nazis by taking them to shelters.
Lithuania	918	See Lithuanian Righteous Among the Nations, including Kazys Binkis and Ona Šimaitė. Based on a population of approximately 2 million ethnic Lithuanians in 1939 the figure represents the second largest per capita number: 1 in 2,183 Lithuanians were awarded (after the Netherlands, with 1 in 1,700).
Hungary	876	Including Zoltán Lajos Bay (physicist: "father of radar-astronomy"); Béla Király (commander, 56 freedom fighter); Géza Ottlik (author); Endre Szervánszky (composer); Paulina and Ilona Kolonits (the latter a documentary film director); Father Raile Jakab, S. J.; Margit Slachta (social activist); Tibor Baranski (religious student, saved about 3,000 Jews); Blessed Sára Salkaházi, S.S.S. (Roman Catholic nun); Karig Sára; László Ocskay (soldier, saved about 2,500 Jews)
Italy	744	Including Laura and Costantino Bulgari, Giovanni Palatucci, Lorenzo Perrone, Calogero Marrone, Angelo Rotta, Andrea Cassulo, Francesco Repetto, Giorgio Perlasca, Gino Bartali and Odoardo Focherini
Belarus	676	Including Vanda Skuratovich and Mariya Yevdokimova and Dennis and Eva Vorobey
Germany	641	See List of German Righteous Among the Nations. Including Oskar Schindler, the businessman who saved more than 1,000 Jews by employing them in his factory; Captain Gustav Schröder who commanded the "Voyage of the Damned"; Wehrmacht officers Wilm Hosenfeld, Heinz Drossel, Karl Plagge, and Albert Battel; resistance fighter Hans von Dohnányi, and writer Armin T. Wegner.
Slovakia	621	Including Pavel Peter Gojdič, Dr. Michal Majercik and his wife Anna
Greece	362	Including Archbishop Damaskinos of Athens and Princess Alice of Battenberg
Russia	215	Including Nikolay Kiselyov
Serbia	139	Including three members of the Milenković family
Latvia	138	Including Jānis Lipke, Paul Schiemann, Roberts Seduls and Johanna Sedule
Croatia	130	See List of Croatian Righteous Among the Nations.
Czech Republic	119	See List of Czech Righteous Among the Nations. Including Alena Hájková, Victor Kugler, Premysl Pitter and Antonín Kalina.
Austria	113	See List of Austrian Righteous Among the Nations. Including Anton Schmid, one of three Wehrmacht soldiers executed for helping Jews.
Moldova	79	Including the Stoyanov family
Albania	75	Including Isuf and Niqi Panariti, parents of former Albanian Minister of Agriculture Edmond Panariti
Romania	69	Including Queen Helen of Romania; the Venerable Áron Márton (Bishop of Alba Iulia); Traian Popovici (credited with saving 20,000 Jews of Bukovina from deportation); Prince Constantin Karadja (credited with saving more than 51,000 Jews); Sabin Motora, a Romanian Gendarmerie officer and commander of the Vapniarka concentration camp, who defied orders and helped save hundreds of Jewish prisoners by transferring them westward and later evacuating them to Romania; and Elisabeta Strul.
Norway	67	See List of Norwegian Righteous Among the Nations. The Norwegian Underground is listed as one group.
Switzerland	49	Including Carl Lutz, who helped save tens of thousands of Hungarian Jews
Bosnia and Herzegovina	49	Including Nurija Pozderac and his wife Devleta, Roza Sober-Dragoje and Zekira Besrević, Mustafa and Zejneba Hardaga, Izet and Bahrija Hardaga, Ahmed Sadik, Derviš Korkut
Armenia	24	Including Taschdjian (Tashchiyan) family
Denmark	22	As per their request, members of the Danish Underground, who participated in the rescue of the Danish Jews, are listed as one group. The fishermen who transported Danish Jews to Sweden in 1943, however, were ineligible because they had been paid.
United Kingdom	22	Including Major Frank Foley and Jane Haining. It excludes Sir Nicholas Winton, who was of Jewish parentage.
Bulgaria	20	Including Dimitar Peshev; Metropolitan Stefan of Sofia and Metropolitan Kiril of Plovdiv of the Bulgarian Orthodox Church
Slovenia	15	Including Zora Piculin
North Macedonia	10	Including Smiljan Franjo Čekada, Boris Altiparmak and Stojan Siljanovski
Sweden	10	Raoul Wallenberg, Per Anger, Ivan Danielsson, Lars Berg, Valdemar Langlet, Nina Langlet, Elow Kihlgren, Erik Perwe, Elisabeth Hesselblad and Erik Myrgren
Spain	9	Ángel Sanz Briz (1966), José Ruiz Santaella and his wife, Carmen (1988), Eduardo Propper de Callejón (2007), Concepción Faya Blásquez y Martín Aguirre y Otegui (2011), Sebastián de Romero Radigales (2014) and Joseph Jose and Victoria Maria (Dolores) Martínez (2016)
United States	5	Varian Fry, Martha and Waitstill Sharp, Lois Gunden, and Master Sergeant Roddie Edmonds
Estonia	3	Uku and Eha Masing and Polina Lentsman
Peru	3	José Maria Barreto, Isabel Weill, and Jose Gambetta
Portugal	3	Including Aristides de Sousa Mendes, who issued thousands of visas to people escaping the Nazis in France, and Carlos Sampaio Garrido who sheltered Jews in safe-houses in Budapest and gave them Portuguese documents to leave the country.
Brazil	2	Luis Martins de Souza Dantas and Aracy de Carvalho Guimarães Rosa
Chile	2	Maria Edwards McClure and Samuel del Campo
Indonesia	3	Tolé Madna and Mima Saïna, Rahmat Kusumobroto.
Republic of China	2	Pan Jun Shun (hid a Ukrainian Jewish girl during the war) and Ho Feng-Shan (provided more than 3,000 visas to Jews in need during his tenure as ambassador of ROC to Vienna in 1938)
Cuba	1	Ámparo Otero Pappo
Ecuador	1	Manuel Antonio Muñoz Borrero
Egypt	1	Mohammed Helmy
El Salvador	1	José Castellanos Contreras (provided Salvadoran citizenship papers to approximately 13,000 Central European Jews)
Georgia	1	Sergei Metreveli
Ireland	1	Mary Elmes (saved at least 200 Jewish children by smuggling them in the boot of her car). There is also a review underway on the case of Mgr. Hugh O'Flaherty, a Catholic priest and Vatican official who rescued thousands of Jews (and some PoWs) in Rome over the course of the war, subject of the TV film The Scarlet and the Black as well as the book and radio play The Scarlet Pimpernel of the Vatican.
Japan	1	Chiune Sugihara, who provided approximately 3,400 transit visas to Jews in need
Luxembourg	1	Victor Bodson, former Justice Minister and Chairman of the Luxembourg House of Representatives, who saved approximately 100 Jews
Montenegro	1	Petar Zanković
Turkey	1	Selâhattin Ülkümen
Vietnam	1	Paul Nguyễn Công Anh
Total	27,921	As of 1 January 2021

== See also ==
- Individuals and groups assisting Jews during the Holocaust

== Bibliography ==
- Those who Helped: Polish Rescuers of Jews During the Holocaust - Publisher: Main Commission for the Investigation of Crimes against the Polish Nation–The Institute of National Memory (1993) ISBN 83-903356-4-6
- Fogelman, Eva. Conscience & Courage: Rescuers of Jews during the Holocaust. New York: Doubleday, 1994.
- Bercher, Elinor J. Schindler's Legacy: True Stories of the List Survivors. New York: Penguin, 1994.
- Michał Grynberg, Księga Sprawiedliwych (Book of the Righteous), Warsaw, PWN, 1993.
