= List of Czech Righteous Among the Nations =

This is a list of Czech Righteous Among the Nations. As of 1 January 2022, 125 Czechs have been honored with this title by Yad Vashem for saving Jews during World War II.

== List ==
- Karla Andělová-Weisová (1978)
- František and Marie Baborovi (in memoriam) (1991)
- Leopold an Antonie Bačovští (1995)
- Dr. Anna Binder-Urbanová (1967)
- Karel and Milada Bisom (2001)
- Josef Bleha (1994)
- Vincenc and Anna Bohatý (in memoriam) (2015)
- Adolf and Anna Brchan (2003)
- Věra Brůžková-Diskantová (2003)
- Bohuslav Čepek and Olga and their daughter Evženie Vroblová (2021)
- Karla and Václav Diviš (1999)
- Alois Dvořák and his daughter Marie (2001)
- Antonín Dvořák (2001)
- Olga Fierz (1966)
- Josef Fišera (1988)
- Libuše Friesová (1999)
- Karel Frýdl (1983)
- Božena Goldscheiderová (2001)
- Iosif and Juzefa Gozak (2004)
- Miloš Hájek (1995)
- Alena Hájková (1991)
- Milena Herbenová (2003)
- Antonín Holátko and his wife (in memoriam) (1991)
- Josef and Anna Holátko (1991)
- Toník and Emilka Holštajn (in memoriam) (1998)
- Alois Holub (1994)
- Ladislav Holub (in memoriam) (2000)
- Matěj and Růžena Homolka and their son Jaroslav (2001)
- Marie and Vladimír Honcík (1995)
- Alice Horáková (2003)
- Wiera and Andrzej Hrek (1966)
- Jaroslav and Anna Chlup (1984)
- Kryštof and Ludmila Jahn (in memoriam) (1983)
- František Jaroš (2021)
- Milena Jesenská (in memoriam) (1994)
- Anna and Karel Jirsa (1999)
- Václav Juran (1983)
- Antonín Kalina (in memoriam) (2012)
- Josef and Anna Karáskovi (2004)
- Libuše and Josef Kašpar (1995)
- Josef and Milada Kolman (2003)
- Anna Koptová (2019)
- Karel Košvanec (2013)
- Vojtěch (in memoriam) and Marie Kovář (2000)
- František Kozák (1978)
- Božena and Karel Kubalovi (in memoriam) (1996)
- Josef and Rosanna Kunáškovi (1995)
- František and Anna Kytlicovi and their son Jaroslav (2001)
- Lesáková (1996)
- Anna and František Makovští (in memoriam) (1996)
- Hana Málková (in memoriam) and her daughter Eva (1999)
- Ladislav Mráček (1999)
- Otakar Nesvadba (2002)
- Vojtěch Adalbert Novák (1989)
- Oldřich and Marie Ohero (2000)
- Anna and František Opata (in memoriam) and their daughters Barbora and Marie (1992)
- Jan and Marie Paseka (1999)
- Miloslav Pažout (1997)
- Přemysl Pitter (1964)
- Františka Prvá (1992)
- Josef Říha (1966)
- Josefa Schovanková (1990)
- Jiří Seydler (2001)
- Růžena Šmídová (in memoriam) and her stepson Bohdan Bohun (1997)
- Irina Sobotková (1963)
- Jana Sudová (2006)
- Václav and Maria Širc (2017)
- Josef Taver (1992)
- Ludmila Tichá (2000)
- Jan and Anna Tkadlečkovi and their son Bohumil (1969)
- Karel & Františka Tojšl (2021)
- Alexander Tomíček (in memoriam) and her daughter Anna Butová (1997)
- Zdeněk Urbánek (1992)
- František and Františka Večerovi (2006)
- Vladimír Vochoč (in memoriam) (2016)
- Vlasta Weinerová (in memoriam) (1990)
- Marie and František Zbořil (2000)
- Jaroslav Zdařil (2000)
- Stanislav Zvoníček (2001)
