= Nikolay Kiselyov =

Nikolay Kiselyov may refer to:

- Nikolay Kiselyov (soldier) (1913–1974), Russian soldier, known for rescuing over 200 Jews from the Nazis during World War II
- Nikolay Kiselyov (athlete) (1939–2005), Russian Nordic combined skier, silver medalist at the 1964 Winter Olympics
- Nikolay Kiselyov (footballer) (born 1946), Russian football player and manager
- Nikolay Kiselyov (politician) (born 1950), Russian politician, former Governor of the Arkhangelsk Oblast
