= Bogorodskoye, Republic of Bashkortostan =

Bogorodskoye Богородское
- Selo
- Location within Bashkortostan Location within Russia
- Coordinates: 55°14′N 55°56′E
- Country: Russia
- Region: Bashkortostan
- District: Blagoveshchensky District

Population (2010)
  - Total: 466
- Time zone: UTC+5:00
- Postal code: 453443

Bogorodskoye (Russian: Богородское) is a rural locality (a selo) and the administrative centre of Bogorodsky Selsoviet, Blagoveshchensky District, Bashkortostan, Russia. The population was 466 as of 2010. There are 7 streets.

== Geography ==
Bogorodskoye is located 28 km north of Blagoveshchensk (the district's administrative centre) by road. Sorvikha is the nearest rural locality.
