= Samuel del Campo =

Chilean diplomat (1882–1960)

- Born: 23 May 1882; Linares, Chile
- Died: 1 January 1972 (aged 89); Vernou-la-Celle-sur-Seine, France
- Occupation: Diplomat
- Known for: Righteous Among the Nations

Samuel del Campo (Linares, Chile, 23 May 1882 – Vernou-la-Celle-sur-Seine, 1 January 1972), was a Chilean diplomat who was recognized as a Righteous Among the Nations for saving 1,200 Jews during the Holocaust by issuing them Chilean passports between 1941 and 1943. He and María Edwards are the only Chileans honored as such.

== Biography ==
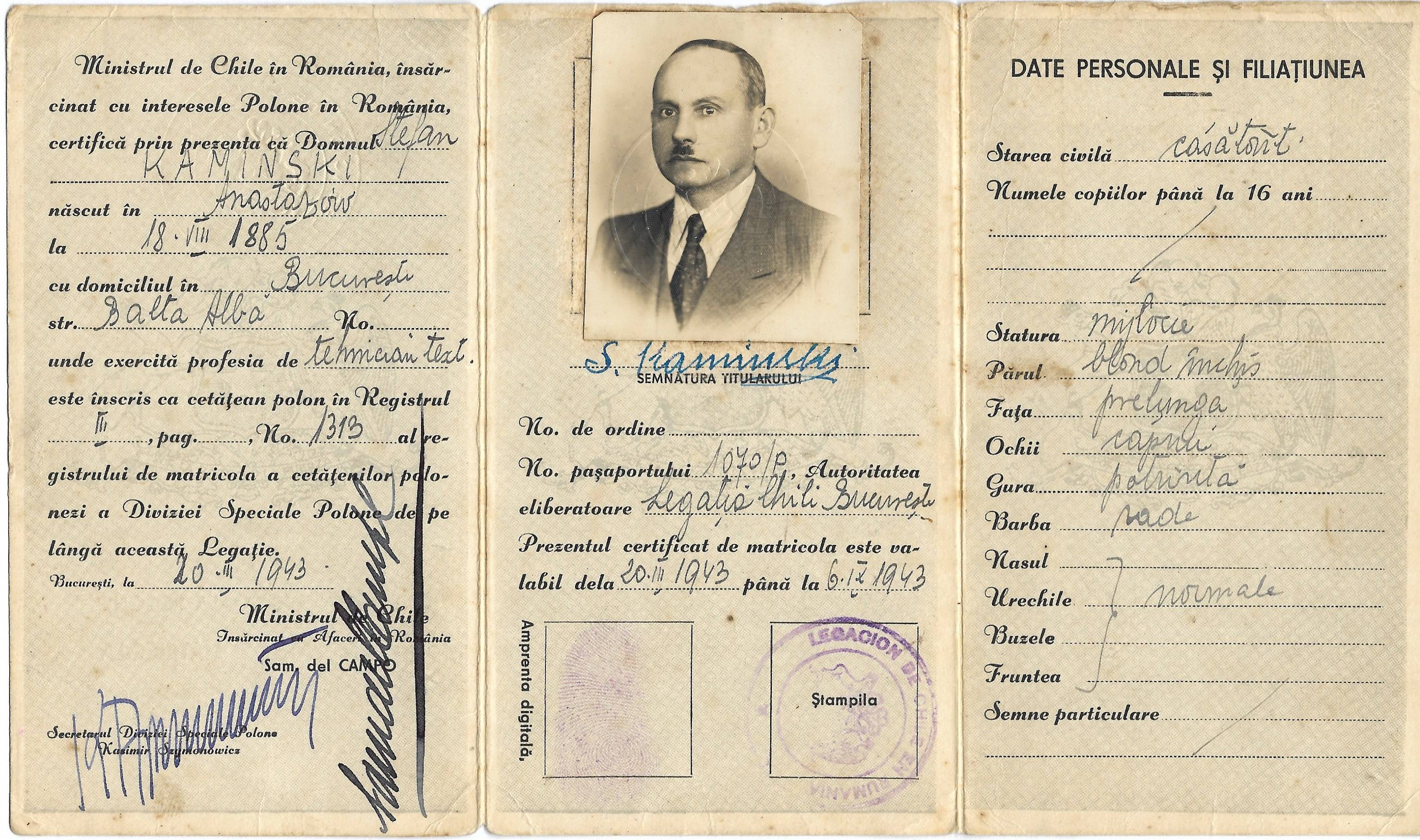
Special Polish refugee ID card issued at Bucharest in 1943 by Samuel del Campo.

Samuel del Campo was born on 23 May 1882, in Chile. He arrived in Paris around 1907 to continue his studies and he was hired as a chemical engineer by the Chilean government to promote sodium nitrate in France. He formed a close friendship with a family in Malakoff, a town on the outskirts of Paris, and moved in with them. He became a diplomat, and beginning in 1941, he worked as the chargé d'affaires for Chile in Bucharest, Romania. By this time, Romania was a dictatorship led by Ion Antonescu and allied with the Axis powers, and Romania took an active part in the Holocaust. As there was no official Polish diplomatic representation in Romania, the representation of Polish citizens was transferred to Chile, still a neutral country during the war.

Del Campo began issuing Chilean passports to Polish Jews, saving them from deportation. He repeatedly pleaded with the Romanian government to save those who he had issued documents to, and according to Romanian historian Anca Tudorancea, “minutes from the Romanian Council of Ministers show that Samuel del Campo became a nuisance at the highest level.” Yad Vashem estimates that Del Campo rescued approximately 1,200 Jews by giving them passports, despite the Chilean government's official non-interference policy. In the spring of 1943, as the tide of war went against the Axis, diplomatic relations between Romania and Chile were severed. Del Campo was subsequently appointed as consul-general in Zürich, but the appointment never came into effect and del Campo left the employ of the Chilean government. He never returned to Chile. With his “adoptive” Malakoff family, he settled in Vernou-la-Celle-sur-Seine, in Seine-et-Marne. He died there in 1972 and rests in the local cemetery, in anonymity.

He was recognized by Yad Vashem as a Righteous Among the Nations on November 23, 2016, 56 years after his death. In 2021, The Chilean embassy in Bucharest unveiled a plaque in Del Campo's memory in front of the Great Synagogue of Bucharest.
