= Alida Bosshardt =

Dutch Righteous Among the Nations (1913 – 2007)

Alida Margaretha Bosshardt
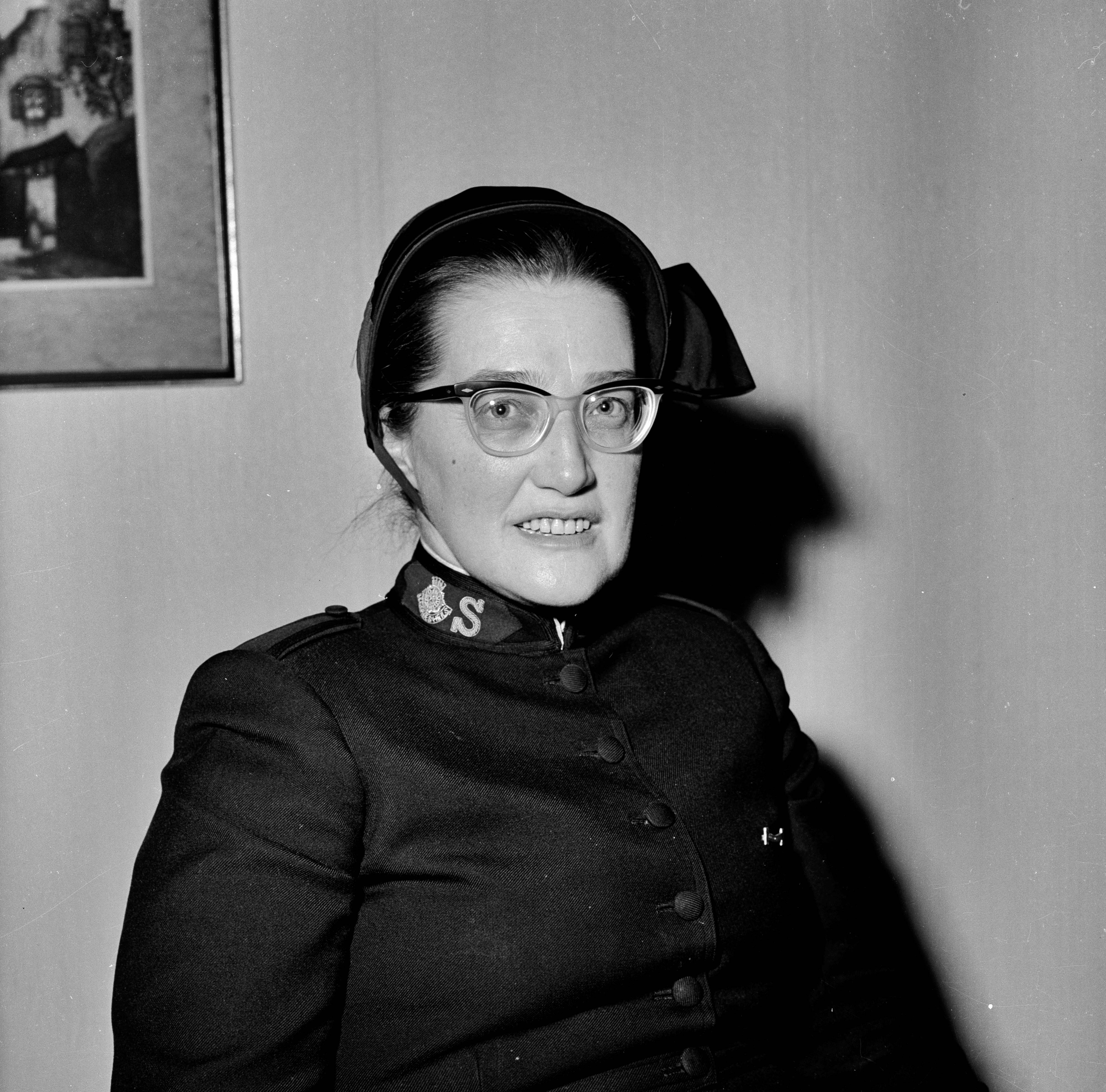
- Bosshardt in 1963
- Born: 8 June 1913; Utrecht, the Netherlands
- Died: 25 June 2007 (aged 94); Amsterdam
- Known for: Righteous Among The Nations

Alida Margaretha Bosshardt (Utrecht, 8 Jun 1913 – Amsterdam, 25 Jun 2007), better known as Major Bosshardt, was a well known officer in The Salvation Army, and more or less the public face of this Christian organization in the Netherlands.

Bosshardt became a member of the Salvation Army after visiting one of their meetings when she was 18. Before that, she was not religious. Her father was a converted Roman Catholic, her mother was Dutch Reformed. From 1934 she worked in a children's home in Amsterdam. During the German occupation in the Second World War, Bosshardt took care of the mostly Jewish children who had been brought by their parents to the home.

After the war, she worked at the Army's national headquarters in Amsterdam. She noticed that the Army had no activities in Amsterdam's red-light district, De Wallen, and obtained permission to start working there. Her work for the prostitutes gained her national fame. In 1965, she accompanied Princess Beatrix on a secret visit of the red-light district.

In 1978, Bosshardt retired. She had already been promoted to lieutenant-colonel in the Army, but she was still generally known as "Major Bosshardt". After her retirement, she was still a prominent member of the Army, regularly appearing on television and speaking at conferences and church services.

In 2004, Yad Vashem recognized Bosshardt as a Righteous Among the Nations, for her work in the Second World War.

== The Major Bosshardt Prize ==
The Major Bosshardt Prize, named after Bosshardt, was established in 2006. It consists of a certificate and a miniature bronze statue of Bosshardt and is intended for persons who have been of singular merit for society. The first award was given to psychologist Anton van der Geld.

== Legacy and honors ==
The Majoor Bosshardtbrug, Oudezijds Achterburgwal in Amsterdam, is named after Alida Bosshardt.

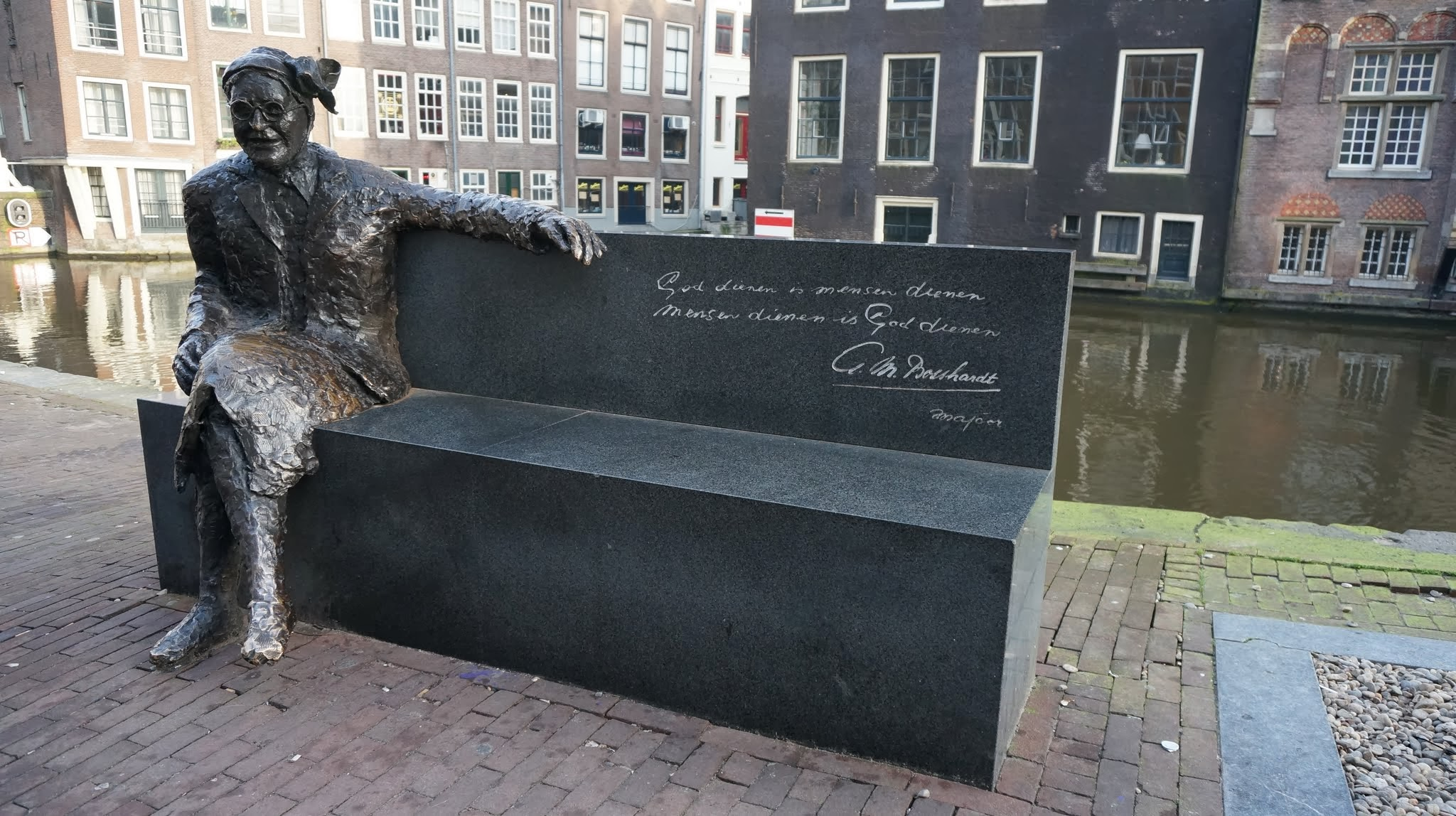
Sculpture of Alida Bosshardt
by Peter de Leeuwe

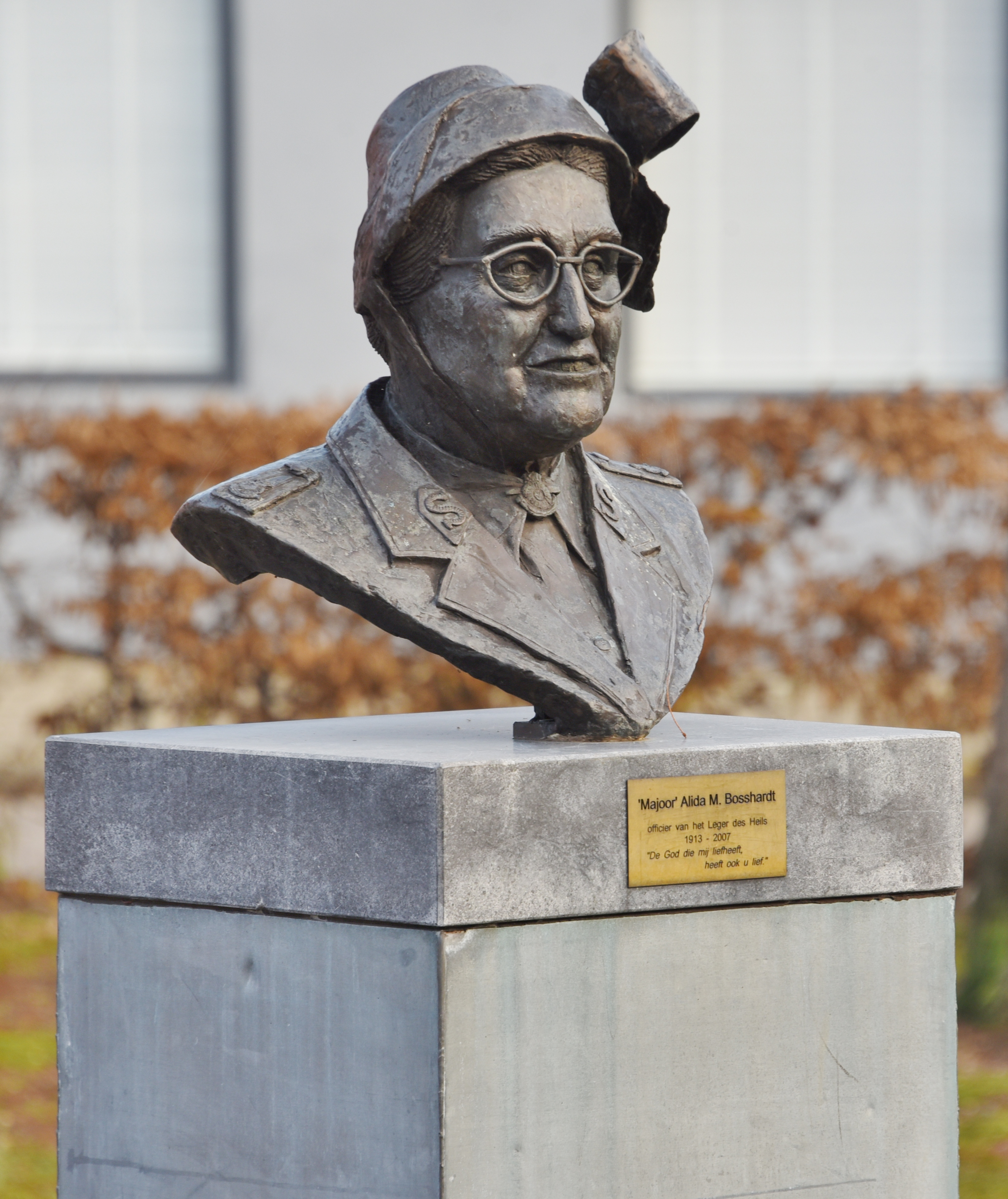
Bust in Terneuzen
