= Sergei Metreveli =

Georgian "Righteous Among the Nations" (1906–1991)

- სერგი მეტრეველი
- Born: 10 November 1906
- Died: 1 October 1991 (aged 84)
- Known for: Righteous Among the Nations

Sergei Metreveli (10 November 1906 – 1 October 1991) was a Georgian who was honored as being Righteous Among the Nations for saving the lives of six people, including two Jews, during the Holocaust. He is currently the only Georgian to have been recognized as such by Yad Vashem. During World War II, he helped the refugees escape Nazi-occupied Kislovodsk and guided them to his home in Utsera.

== Biography ==
Sergei Metreveli was born on 10 November 1906. In the beginning years of World War II, Metreveli lived in the city of Kislovodsk in the North Caucasus, then a part of the Soviet Union, where he worked as a winemaker. In August 1942, Nazi Germany invaded Kislovodsk, putting the Jewish population of the city at risk. Metreveli helped six people escape the Nazi-occupied city, and for sixteen days, guided them through the Racha highlands. Among them was a sixteen year-old Jewish boy named Emil Zigel, whose three brothers had been killed in combat previously, and who suffered from malaria during the 500-kilometer journey. Metreveli eventually sheltered the refugees in his home in the town of Utsera, now located in Georgia. After being nursed back to health by Metreveli's family, Zigel enlisted in the Red Army to fight against the Germans. Zigel's parents, who did not flee Kislovodsk, were killed by the Germans in September 1942.

After the war in 1946, Zigel reconnected with the Metreveli family, and would routinely visit them on vacation afterwards. In 2004, Zigel, then a retired Guard Colonel, testified about Metreveli's actions, saying "[his family] welcomed me as their own son" and credited him with helping Zigel avoid the fate of his parents. Partly due to Zigel's testimony, Yad Vashem posthumously honored Metreveli as a Righteous Among the Nations in 2004; Metreveli had died almost thirteen years prior, on 1 October 1991.

== Legacy ==
His name is inscribed in the Wall of Honor, located in the Garden of the Righteous Among the Nations in Jerusalem. Israeli House, an organization dedicated to the principle of Hasbara, made a documentary, entitled Georgian Schindler, about Metreveli and Zigel in 2015. In 2020, Israeli House opened a monument in Oni, Georgia, dedicated to Metreveli and remembering the Holocaust, becoming the first Holocaust memorial in Georgia.
