= William Arnold Egger =

Surinamese resistance fighter

William Arnold Eggers
- Born: William Arnold Eggers; 24 February 1900; Paramaribo, Suriname
- Died: 2 March 1989 (aged 89); Leidschendam, Netherlands
- Occupation: clerk

William Arnold Egger (24 February 1900 – 2 March 1989) was a Surinamese resistance fighter in the Netherlands during the Second World War.

Born in Paramaribo, Egger was the grandson of a slave. He moved to the Netherlands to pursue his education, where he married Engelina Jas, a Dutch Jewish woman from Amsterdam. After graduating, they returned to Suriname, however the economy was depressed, and in 1935 the couple decided to go to the Netherlands, and settled in The Hague.

During the Second World War, Engelina's father was arrested. The Eggers hid 12 Jewish people in the cellar of the home, but the couple was betrayed to the Nazis. Egger and his wife were first sent to the prison in Scheveningen, and on to the concentration camps of Amersfoort, and Vught. The couple survived their incarceration, but the Jews they sheltered did not. In 2014, Egger was posthumously by Israel's Yad Vashem awarded with the honor of Righteous among the Nations.
