= Roberts Seduls and Johanna Sedule =

Roberts Seduls (February 20, 1906 – March 10, 1945) and Johanna Sedule (1910–1987) were the family of the Righteous among Nations (recognition date: December 2, 1981) who saved eleven Jews in Liepāja during the Holocaust in Latvia.

Among the sheltered was a woman with a three-year-old daughter, Ada. Seduls arranged her shelter with Otilija Schimelpfenig, a widow of German descent. In 2000s Ada applied for the Righteous among Nations for Otilija Schimelpfenig, granted on April 26, 2006.

Roberts Seduls was killed during a Soviet air raid. His wife continued to care for the rescued Jews.

The diary of one of the rescued, Kalman Linkimer, originally written in Yiddish, was translated in English.
