= Elisabeta Strul =

Elisabeta Strul (1920 – November 6, 2013) was a Romanian woman who saved Jews during the Holocaust and was recognized as a Righteous Among the Nations by Yad Vashem for her actions during World War II. She married Marcus Strul, a Jew who worked with her in the textile factory where she worked. They immigrated to Israel and started a family.

== Early life ==
Strul was born in the Nicolina neighborhood of Iași, Romania in 1920.

== Activity during World War II ==
On the evening of June 29, 1941, Strul heard from her Christian neighbors that groups of antisemitic Christians were organizing a pogrom to take place against the city's Jews that evening.

When she realized what was going to happen, Strul ran toward her friend from work, Marcus Strul, to warn him and his family of the impending danger. Strul offered the family members a hiding place in her warehouse along with about twenty other Jews. Strul hid them and provided them with shelter and food for more than two weeks and saved their lives doing so. Strul was not satisfied with this and she moved between the houses of the Jews in the neighborhood to warn them of the danger to their lives. She saved dozens of Jews.

In addition to her actions in that same pogrom, which prevented the deaths of dozens of innocent Jews, her co-workers and neighbors testified in their writings after the war how when the Romanian government passed a law that all Jews had to wear a yellow patch, Strul decided to wear the yellow patch proudly with them as a sign of solidarity.

Later throughout the war, while many Jews were sent to labor camps (including some of her Jewish friends), Strul smuggled packages of food and clothing into the camps.

As a result of her actions, she was caught, severely beaten and detained for several days. This did not prevent her from continuing her actions out of a sense of deep friendship, devotion, and a desire to save human lives.

== Honors ==
On March 19, 1987, Strul was recognized as a Righteous Among the Nations and a tree was planted at Yad Vashem to honor her. On May 19, 2008, the Garden of the Righteous Among the Nations was inaugurated in Haifa. A monument was erected in order to commemorate her memory and her rescue of Jews.
