= Federico Barreto =

Peruvian poet and writer

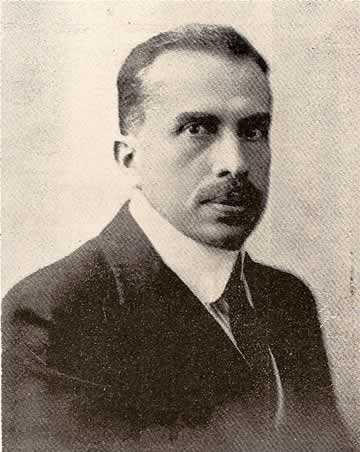
- Born: February 8, 1862; Tacna, Peru
- Died: October 30, 1929 (aged 67)
- Resting place: Tacna General Cemetery -18.000660, -70.258164
- Occupations: Journalist, Poet
- Years active: 1886-1927
- Relatives: José Maria Barreto

Federico Barreto (1862 in Tacna, Peru - 1929 in Marseille, France) was a Peruvian poet and writer best known for his poetry collection El cantor del cautiverio.

== Early life ==
Barreto's father was a colonel in the Peruvian Army. Barreto himself was born on February 8, 1868, and lived in Tacna during the Chilean occupation after the War of the Pacific. Working as a writer and journalist alongside his brother, he advocated for the Peruvian identity of the territories occupied in opposition to Chilenization.

He was one of the founding members of two magazines, the weekly El Progresista (1886) and the Círculo Vigil (1888). Barreto and his brother José Maria joined a literary circle known as La Bohemia Tacneña, which published a magazine between 1896 and 1898 called Letras. The publication had contributing writers such as Rubén Darío, Clemente Palma, José Enrique Rodó and José Santos Chocano.

== Later life and death ==
Barreto and his brother co-directed La Voz del Sur, a newspaper focusing on local coverage of Tacna. However, in 1911 a Chilean mob destroyed the printing presses that made del Sur and another Peruvian newspaper, El Tacora.

In 1912, he published a poetry collection, Algo mío, which won acclaim and was a great financial success for Barreto, selling out one printing in 1912, and another in 1925.

He published a story about the Chilean occupation of Tacna in 1921 under the title of La Procesión de la Bandera.- Episodio histórico del cautiverio de Tacna.

In 1925, after the proposed vote for the cities of Tacna and Arica to join either Peru or Chile never took place, he joined the Propaganda Commission of the Peruvian Delegation. Based on that he wrote Frente al morro, a novel about life aboard the ship Ucayali, next to which the Peruvian delegation was established in Arica.

In 1927 he published another poetry collection titled, Aroma de mujer.

Barreto died on October 30, 1929, in Marseille, France. During the same year Tacna was returned to Peru. In 1968, his remains were repatriated from Marseille and buried in the General Cemetery of Tacna.

== Themes in Poetry ==
Barreto's poetry shows two main focuses.

The first is about the love for his hometown and his country, affected by the occupation throughout his life. He uses Romanticism to define a love of a homeland and the use of poetry to express the will of the people.

The second is love poetry, which he focused on conveying sensations to the reader. In his poems, a loved one was not an ideal, but a flawed being of flesh and blood. Aspects of Modernism are seen in how he explores the sensory and the passionate. His love poems were his most commercially successful works.

== Selected works ==
- Algo mío (1912)
- Aroma de mujer (1927)
- Poesías (1964) (Edición póstuma)
