= Pavel Gerdjikov =

Bulgarian physician and rescuer of Jews during World War II

- Павел Герджиков
- Born: July 5, 1906; Shumen, Principality of Bulgaria
- Died: July 2, 1985 (aged 78); Sofia, People's Republic of Bulgaria
- Occupation: Physician
- Known for: Rescue of Jews during World War II; recognized as Righteous Among the Nations

Pavel Gerdjikov (Bulgarian: Павел Герджиков; July 5, 1906 – July 2, 1985) was a Bulgarian physician who helped Jews in Bulgaria during World War II. He was recognized by Yad Vashem as Righteous Among the Nations in 1980. In Bulgarian-language coverage he has been referred to as the "Bulgarian Schindler".

== Early life and career ==
Gerdjikov was born in Shumen on July 5, 1906. From 1941 he ran the internal medicine department of a military hospital near Sofia.

== World War II rescue activities ==
In March 1943, Gerdjikov distributed medicines to Jews who were about to be deported by train and removed children from the train, arranging hiding places for them. Stille Helden describes four children; Bulgarian National Radio reports five.

He also assisted the Jewish Levi family. Stille Helden states that he hid Abraham and Mary Levi and their daughters Erika and Nina for months in 1943, later arranging accommodation outside Sofia, forging non-Jewish identity papers for members of the family, and providing food until the end of the war.

== Recognition ==
In 1980, Yad Vashem recognized Gerdjikov as Righteous Among the Nations. Yad Vashem’s published list of honorees for Bulgaria includes "Gerdjikov, Dr. Pavel" with recognition year 1980 (No. 1739).

== Later life ==
Gerdjikov died in Sofia on July 2, 1985.

== See also ==
- Righteous Among the Nations
- Rescue of the Bulgarian Jews
