= Teresio Olivelli =

Italian Roman Catholic

Blessed Teresio Olivelli
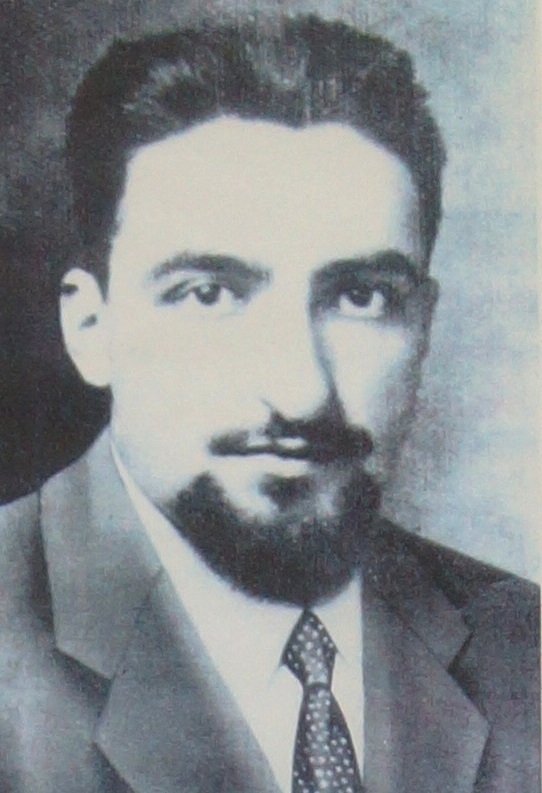
- Born: 7 January 1916; Bellagio, Como, Kingdom of Italy
- Died: 12 January 1945 (aged 29); Hersbruck, Nürnberger Land, Nazi Germany
- Venerated in: Roman Catholic Church
- Beatified: 3 February 2018, Palazzetto di Vigevano, Vigevano, Italy by Cardinal Angelo Amato
- Feast: 17 January

Teresio Olivelli (7 January 1916 – 12 January 1945) was an Italian Roman Catholic soldier during World War II and part of the Italian Resistance movement to Fascism and the Nazi regime. Olivelli graduated in law in Pavia in 1938 and went on to comment in papers on the legal and social issues of the time before he became a volunteer fighter for the Nationalist faction during the Spanish Civil War and in World War II with a notable campaign fought in Russia. The war soured his views towards the Italian fascist regime of Benito Mussolini and his time in the resistance was marked with articles in a newspaper he founded dedicated to promoting the Christian message and attempting to improve upon aspects of fascism with a more Christian message.

Olivelli's beatification cause started in 1988 under Pope John Paul II and he became titled as a Servant of God. The cause was first designed to demonstrate that Olivelli died because of hatred of his faith – thus beatification would be quicker – but disagreements led to a prolonged cause designed instead to prove Olivelli led a life of heroic virtue which Pope Francis confirmed on 14 December 2015. This confirmation allowed for the pope to name him as Venerable. Francis approved his beatification on 16 June 2017 and he was beatified on 3 February 2018 in Vigevano.

== Life ==
Teresio Olivelli was born in 1916 in Como to Domenico Olivelli and Clelia Invernizzi. His maternal uncle was the priest Rocco Invernizzi – parish priest of Tremezzo – who served as Olivelli's spiritual and moral point of reference. He moved with his parents in 1926 to Pavia and was good at Latin when he studied there.

He studied at Mortara and at Vigevano before transferring his studies to Pavia in 1934 where he graduated in law with honors in 1938 from the Ghislieri College. Each week he went to confession and to receive the Eucharist in the parish of San Lorenzo. It was around this time that he was a member of Catholic Action as well as the F.U.C.I. and a Fascist student group. In 1939 he became the assistant of administrative law at the University of Turin and won a competition in Trieste for oratorical skills, with a thesis on human dignities for all irrespective of race. He also penned articles on the social and legal issues of the times in the college paper "Book and Musket" and in the journal "Fascist Civilization". While in Turin he aided the poor and orphaned. He also learned to speak fluent German.

In 1936 he volunteered to fight in the Spanish Civil War and then moved for educational reasons to Berlin from 1939 to 1941. In 1941 he volunteered to go to Russia to fight in World War II where he contracted frostbite due to the severe cold weather. Olivelli did not want to swear allegiance to the new Italian Social Republic in 1943 and was thus deported to Innsbruck in Austria on 9 September 1943 until he managed to flee and settle in Milan in the evening of 20–21 October. He started to become critical of the Italian regime and believed he could improve it through a more Christian message though later broke from it after seeing the situation with deporting Jewish people as per racial laws and the French invasion. Olivelli became part of the Italian resistance movement in Milan as part of the triangular resistance including Brescia and Cremona branches. He remained in touch with resistance members such as Peppino Pelosi and Carlo Manziana while he was in Brescia. Olivelli worked hard to create the newspaper "Il ribelle" and the first issue published on 5 March 1944 was dedicated to Astolfo Lunardi and Ermanno Margheriti who were both executed not long before. His paper was the underground newspaper for the Green Flames Brigades partisan group. Carlo Bianchi and Claudio Sartori helped him establish the paper in February 1944. Olivelli's codename at this time was "Agostino Gracchi".

The partisan was apprehended in Milan on 27 April 1944 and was at once taken to the prison of San Vittore where he was tortured and beaten before being moved to Fossoli on 8 June. On 11 July his name was added to a list of 70 inmates to be shot but he fled and hid in a field until he was recaptured. He was then transferred to Bolzano (August 1944) before being sent to Flossenbürg (September 1944) and then to Hersbruck. He shared food rations with inmates and treated their injuries and even spent time with Blessed Odoardo Focherini to comfort him before the latter died. Olivelli died from injuries he sustained in 1945 not long after defending a Ukrainian inmate from being attacked. He was kicked in the stomach and intestines and was struck 25 times. His remains were cremated at the camp's crematorium.

== Beatification process ==
The beatification process opened in the Diocese of Vigevano in a diocesan process that Bishop Mario Rossi inaugurated on 29 March 1987 and that Bishop Giovanni Locatelli closed in a solemn Mass on 16 September 1989. The formal introduction to the cause came under Pope John Paul II on 19 January 1988 after the Congregation for the Causes of Saints issued the official "nihil obstat" and titled him as a Servant of God. The C.C.S. later validated the process on 27 March 1992 and received the Positio dossier in 2011. Historians – in a unanimous decision – voted in favor of the cause on 24 May 2011 while the theologians issued their approval – a majority verdict – on 2 December 2014 (after an inconclusive 17 December 2013 session) before the C.C.S. met to approve the cause (unanimous) on 1 December 2015. The confirmation of his life of heroic virtue allowed for Pope Francis to name Olivelli as Venerable.

But officials of the cause remained adamant that Olivelli was killed in hatred of his faith and therefore sought to establish another Positio that would lead to beatification without the required miracle needed for cases of heroic virtue. The Positio was submitted to the C.C.S. in 2016 at which stage theologians made a unanimous decision based on those new findings on 7 March 2017. The C.C.S. later met on 6 June 2017 and approved this and the cause shall now be passed to the pope for his approval. It has been reported that the beatification will take place in Vigevano on 13 January 2018 once the pope approves the cause. The pope approved his beatification on 16 June 2017 and he shall be beatified on 3 February 2018 after a new date for the beatification was coordinated. Cardinal Angelo Amato presided over the celebration on the pope's behalf; there were several bishops in attendance including the Archbishop of Milan Mario Enrico Delpini.

The first postulator for the cause was Innocenzo Venchi (1986–2004) and Abdul Rahman (2004–2011). The current postulator is Tiziana Adriana Conterbia (2011–present). The first relator for the cause was Cristoforo Bove from 3 April 1992 until his death on 4 October 2010 at which point Vincenzo Criscuolo was made the relator a month later on 12 November 2010.
