= Hardaga family =

The Hardaga family was a traditional Muslim family that lived in the capital of Bosnia and Herzegovina, Sarajevo. The house where they lived was inhabited by Mustafa and his wife Zejneba, Mustafa’s brother Izet and his wife Bahrija.

== Activity during WWII ==
In April 1941, the house of the Kavilio family was destroyed due to the bombing of the German Air Force, just before the German invasion of Yugoslavia. Mustafa and the Kavilio family knew each other even before the start of World War II, as Mustafa owned the factory building where Josef Kavilio manufactured steel sewage pipes. Mustafa invited the Kavilio family to live in his house. Due to the Hardaga family being a traditional Muslim family, the women of the family used to cover their faces in front of strangers, so the custom of hospitality was not acceptable. Still, Mustafa invited the Kavilio family to stay at their house. He ordered the women of the family not to cover their faces in their house. At that time, the threats against the Jews and those hiding Jews increased, and huge signs threatening to kill families who hid Jews were hung on the Gestapo’s building in front of their house. Following the threats, Josef Kavilio knew that he was endangering the Hardaga family, and decided to move his wife and children to Mostar, an area under Italian control where Jews enjoyed relative security.

Josef, who remained in Sarajevo to take care of his business in the factory, was extradited and imprisoned. On one occasion, he was cleaning the snow from the streets as part of his work as a prisoner when Zejneba Hardaga saw him and thus began to bring him a lot of food every day, enough for him and for the whole group of prisoners who cleaned the streets with him.

Josef Kavilio managed to escape from the prison through the mountains and returned to the Hardaga family home where they received him again with open arms. Throughout his imprisonment, the Hardaga family continued to transfer money to his family in Mostar. The threat in the city increased and Josef feared bringing disaster to the Hardaga family so he decided to reunite with his family.

== Post-World War II ==
At the end of the war, the Kavilio family returned to the Hardaga family house, where they were happily received, which was sadly mixed because Zejneba Hardaga's father, Ahmed Sadik, who also hid a Jewish family (the Papo family who was a friend of the Kavilio family) was captured and executed.

The Kavilio family immigrated to Israel, but remained in close contact with the Hardaga family. Mustafa Hardaga died in the 1960s, Salih Hardaga (Zejneba's brother) moved to Mexico in 1974, and Zejneba remained in Sarajevo with her family.

In 1984 the Kavilio family lobbied the Yad Vashem Holocaust Museum to recognize the Hardaga family and Ahmad Sadik as Righteous Among the Nations. Zejneba Hardaga and her family were the first Muslims to receive the Righteous Among the Nations medals.

In the 1990s, when the civil war in Bosnia began, the Kavilio family and others were concerned about the well-being of the Hardaga family. Mordecai Paldiel at Yad Vashem reached out to Tova (Kabiljo) Rosenberg to ascertain Zejneba's condition. Rosenberg contacted an Israeli journalist headed for Bosnia and was able to get in touch with the Hardaga family. Zejneba, her youngest daughter Sara Pecanac and Sara's husband and daughter were hiding in their basement. Zejneba was not able to access heart medication she needed to survive. Paldiel contacted the Joint Distribution Committee to get her medicine, but was informed that she would need more care, necessitating an evacuation for Hardaga and her family. Yad Vashem asked the Bosnian leaders to allow Zejneba and her family to come to Israel, but was denied. It wasn't until Israeli Prime Minister Yitzhak Rabin intervened that the family was able to join a JDC convoy and escape Bosnia. The Hardaga family was given a choice of where to resettle, and decided to travel to Jerusalem. On February 10, 1994, the Hardaga family arrived in Israel.

Zejneba's daughter Sara, her husband, Branimir (later Moshe), and Daughter Sasha (Ruth) decided to convert to Judaism. When asked by their Beit din why they were choosing to convert, Sarah told the court that due to her mother's choice to risk her life for Jews, "it is only natural that I should want to become Jewish".

== Honors ==
- In 1985, Zejneba Hardaga came to plant a tree and receive in their name the honor of Righteous Among the Nations.

== See also ==
- History of the Jews in Bosnia and Herzegovina
- Righteous Among the Nations
