= László Ocskay =

Hungarian Army officer rescuing Jews during the Holocaust

- Native name: Ocskay László
- Born: 25 May 1893; Pozsony, Austria-Hungary
- Died: 27 March 1966 (aged 72); Kingston, N.Y., USA
- Allegiance: Hungary
- Rank: Captain
- Awards: Righteous Among the Nations

László Jenő Ocskay of Ocskó and Felsődubován (1893–1966) was a Hungarian army officer, captain of the Royal Hungarian Army. He saved approximately 2500 Jews in Budapest in 1944–45, thus being one of those Hungarians who saved the most Jews during the Holocaust.

== Origin and early life ==
Ocskay was born on 25 May 1893 in Pozsony, Austria-Hungary into the noble Ocskay family of Ocskó and Felsődubován. His ancestors include the kuruc brigadier László Ocskay, a well-known figure of Rákóczi's War of Independence. His father was István Ocskay of Ocskó and Felsődubován (1844–1908), parliamentary representative of Bereg County, his mother was Eugénia Bogen (1852–1939). His grandparents on his father's side were Rudolf Ocskay of Ocskó and Felsődubován (1815–1904), Lord Lieutenant (főispán) of Nyitra County and Mária Scultéty of Szoppór.

He served and was injured in the First World War as an artilleryman. He joined the National Army (later to become the Royal Hungarian Army) led by Miklós Horthy as a volunteer in 1919. Later he was employed by the American Vacuum Oil Company, which transported oil into Germany.

== Second World War ==
In 1943 he volunteered to serve again, possibly with the intention of helping the persecuted Jews. He became the commander of the number 101/359 Jewish forced labor battalion, which was officially collecting, mending and making clothing items for the German army.

The original battalion with 200 men was housed in Síp Street in the middle of the Jewish quarter, but soon they had to be moved to the Jewish Secondary School in Zugló because of their growing numbers. Eventually there were about 2500 people, men, women and children, under Ocskay's protection. He was trying to provide for the people he hid with food, medicine, and even official documents.

On the surface Ocskay maintained excellent relationships with the German occupying forces. These connections helped when, on one memorable occasion in January 1945, with the help of the Waffen-SS forces stationed in Budapest, he managed to drive away members of the Hungarian Arrow Cross Party, who were about to execute these thousands of Jews by shooting them into the Danube. After this incident the building continued to be protected by the Waffen-SS. Apart from Ocskay's strong diplomatic skills and connections, this achievement might have been helped by the German forces wanting to paint a better picture of themselves in face of the imminent military crush.

== After the Second World War ==
When the German forces were driven out of Hungary, the occupying Soviet army very nearly deported the men of the battalion, who eventually managed to escape. Ocskay was not friendly with the communists, who started to persecute him for his noble origins, his military past in Horthy's army and his German and American connections. In 1948 he escaped and emigrated into USA. He went on to live forgotten and poor, working as a night guard in Kingston, N.Y., until his death there on 27 March 1966.

== Legacy ==
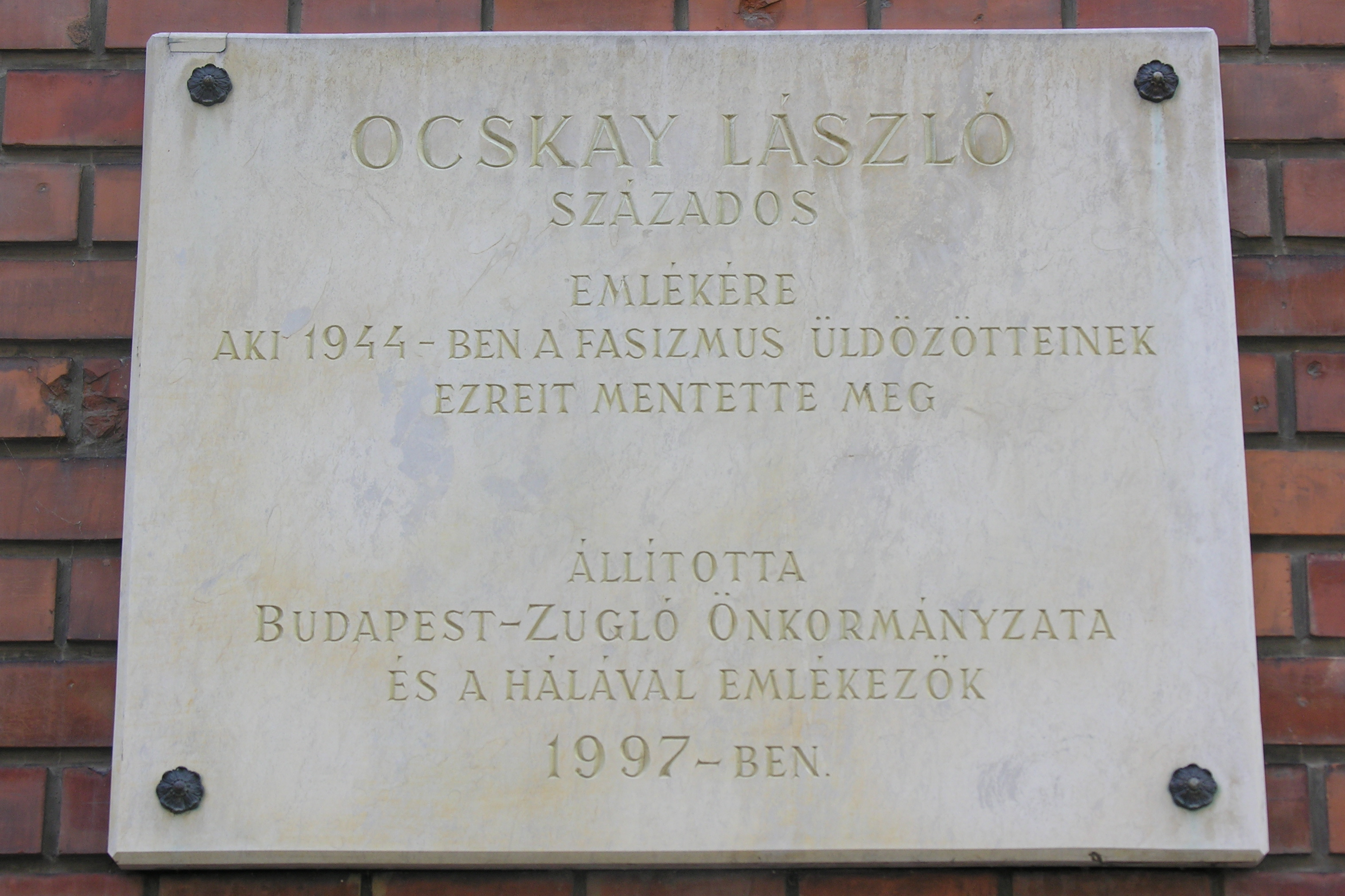
Memorial plaque of the local council on the wall of the school

His story, like so many others, was forgotten for decades in Hungary. In the 1990s people rescued by him initiated a memorial in his honor. It was eventually erected in October 2008 in the City Park of Budapest, where in July 2015 a street was also named after him. On 23 October 1996 he was given a posthumous gold medal by President of Hungary Árpád Göncz. He was awarded the Righteous Among the Nations title by Yad Vashem in 2002. In 2007 a 70-minute documentary film was made with the recollections of survivors by the title Captain László Ocskay, the Forgotten Hero. In 2008 a documentary book was published by historian Szabolcs Szita: The Story of László Ocskay in view of saving Jews in the Holocaust. In October 2019 the community of ELTE Radnóti Miklós Secondary School created an interactive theater play, Being Human, recalling life at the number 101/359 battalion using the original venue of the events.
