= Block 66 =

Children's block of the Buchenwald concentration camp

Block 66, the Children's Block (or Kinderblock) was part of Buchenwald concentration camp, in what was known as the "little camp", which was separated from the rest of the camp by barbed wire. Buchenwald was a labor camp, and as a result a child's chances of survival depended greatly on their age. The older they were, the better, because that meant that they were fit to do work. Oftentimes, children lied about their ages to make them older, so that rather than being sent to Auschwitz or Bergen-Belsen to be killed, they could work in the camp. Children were at high risk for being killed at Buchenwald, because if they were too weak or young, this meant that they were unfit for labor, and therefore had no use. The creation of the children's barrack, Block 66, served to protect these children from the Nazi agenda.

== History ==
Block 66 was created in 1945, during the last year of the war. The need for this block was related to the rapidly increasing number of children in Buchenwald. In April 1943, there were only 142 inmates under the age of twenty. At this time, the children were kept hidden in Block 8, located in the main camp. By the time December 1944 rolled around however, there were over 23,000 inmates under the age of 20, which was 37% percent of the population. The age group of specifically 14-18 year olds, was around eighty-five percent of the total number of children in the camp. The youngest reported inmate was a Polish three-year old.

During the last year of the war, the Nazis began sending large numbers of Jewish Eastern European children to Buchenwald as a result of their failing war efforts. The Nazis were forced to evacuate other camps due to the Allied Powers closing in on the German fronts.

== Establishment of the block ==
The establishment of the children's block was led by Antonin Kalina, a Czech communist prisoner. Kalina, with the help of other political prisoners, was able to persuade the SS at Buchenwald to let them create a block for the new influx of adolescents coming in from the East. The block used for the children was conveniently located in the corner of the little camp, ensuring that it was as far away from the Nazi's watch as possible.

Every block had what was called a “block elder” who was responsible for ensuring that the inmates of their block went to roll-call, followed orders, did their work, and kept up with their daily tasks. The block elder of Block 66 was Kalina, and he is primarily responsible for saving the lives of the 900 boys living in Block 66.

== Life in the barrack ==
While conditions were not great anywhere in the camp, for the children of Block 66, they were slightly better. Unlike adults, most children could not fend off the disease, hunger, and physical and psychological trauma as well. Adults, specifically the communist prisoners, tried to help the children. The other prisoners in Buchenwald did all they could in their power to try and protect the children from the SS, and as the war was clearly ending, from being taken out on death marches. Men would also give extra food to these starving boys and share packages from the Red Cross with them. Had there not been Block 66, most of these children would have perished in the camp.

The children were not made to work in the camp, as most were too weak and young to do any actual labor. During the days, when it was possible, the children were taught songs in Yiddish and told stories by some elders and older children to keep them occupied and filled with hope for the outside world.

Additionally, Kalina, to help protect the children in the barrack, made them change clothes, so as not to be dressed as Jews, and changed the Jewish sounding names of the boys, so that when the SS officers came by looking for Jews, he could tell them that there were none in his block.

== Liberation ==
On April 11, 1945, at approximately 3:15 pm, Buchenwald was finally liberated by the U.S. Army; 21,000 inmates were liberated that day of which 904 were children. After liberation, most of these boys, after receiving medical attention and aid, having lost their families, were sent to orphanages.

== After the war ==
Years later, Antonin Kalina was accepted as “righteous among the nations” at Yad Vashem Holocaust Memorial in Israel, in 2012, for his efforts and for successfully saving the lives of 904 youths.
