= Tolé Madna =

Dutch-born Indonesian and Righteous Among the Nations

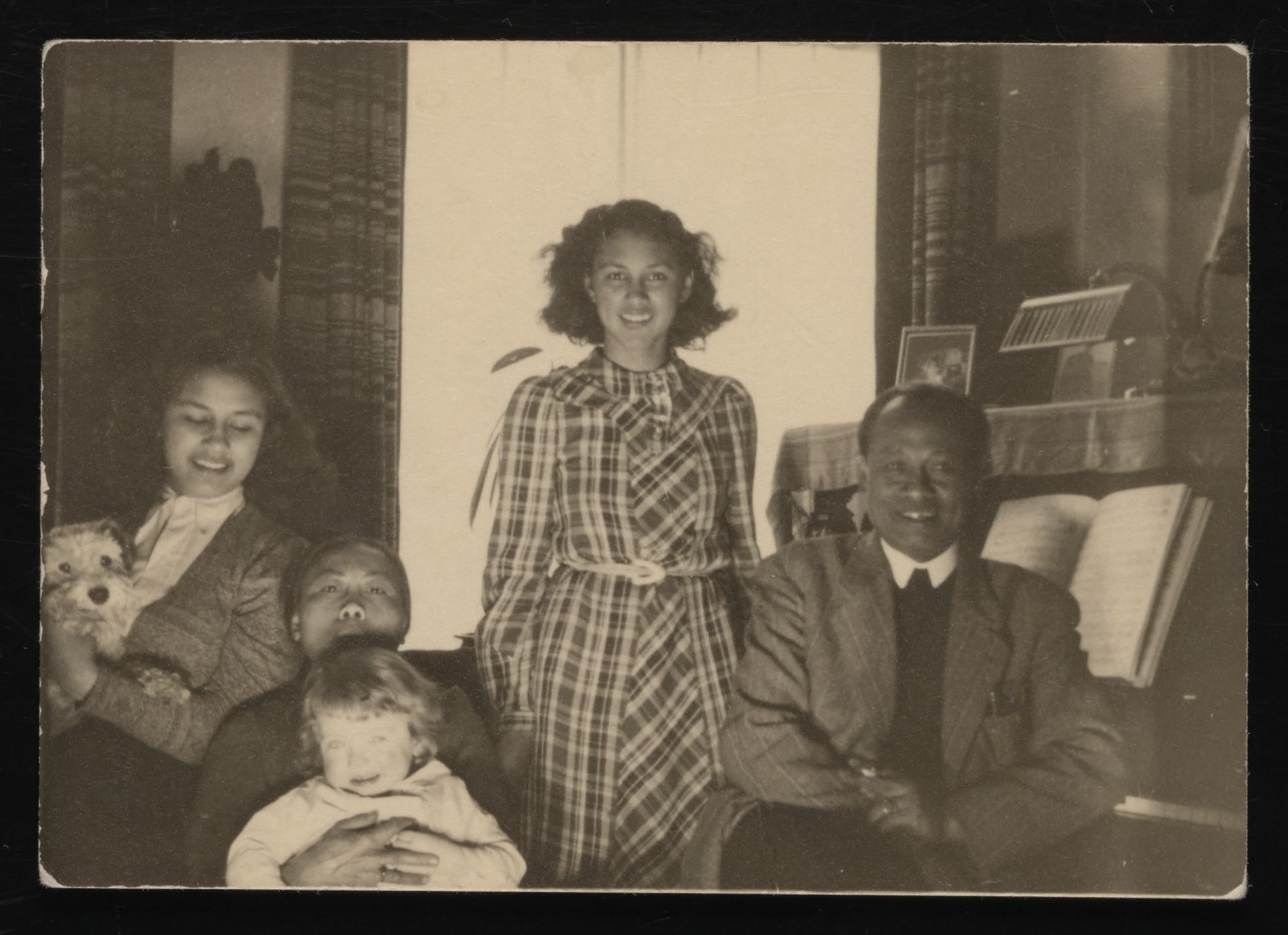
- Tolé Madna, right, with his family. Alfred Munzer is in the lap of Mima Saïna, second from left.
- Born: 5 December 1898; Java, Dutch East Indies
- Died: 9 January 1992 (aged 93)
- Known for: Righteous Among the Nations

Tolé Madna (5 December 1898 – 9 January 1992) was an Indonesian who, during World War II, sheltered and protected a Jewish child while living in Nazi-occupied Netherlands. On 12 January 2003, Yad Vashem recognized him and his housemaid, Mima Saïna, as Righteous Among the Nations for their actions.

== Biography ==
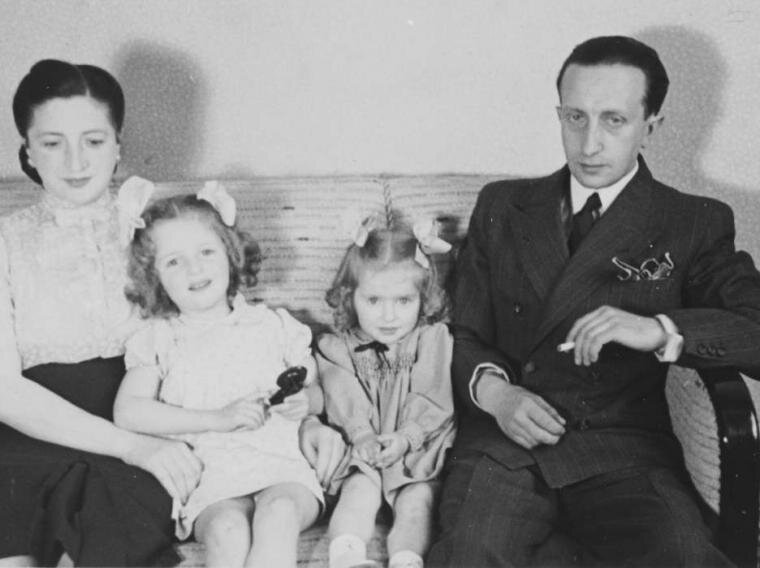
The Münzer family. Only Gisele (left) and Alfred (not pictured) would survive the war.

Tolé Madna was born on 5 December 1898 on the island of Java in the Dutch East Indies. He and his family immigrated to The Hague in The Netherlands in 1916. Later, when his family returned to the Indies, Tolé decided to stay in The Hague and found work. In 1926, he married a Dutch woman, Johanna van der Roest, with whom he had three children. Tolé and Johanna later divorced.

In September 1942, about two years after Nazi Germany invaded the Netherlands, Johanna was contacted by her Jewish neighbor, Gitla Münzer. The Münzer family, consisting of Gitla and her husband, Simche, along with their three children, Eva, Leah, and Alfred, needed to go into hiding, as the German authorities began rounding up Jews. Gitla asked Johanna to shelter Alfred, then 10 months old. Simche was in hiding in a psychiatric hospital, while Eva and Leah were placed with the friend of a neighbor. After Johanna determined that Alfred was not safe hiding with her, she turned to her ex-husband, Tolé, who agreed to take him in to his care.

Together with his housekeeper, Mima Saïna, Tolé treated Alfred as one of his own children. Alfred would later recount:

"They shared their meager food allowance with me because I did not legally exist and was not entitled to ration coupons. They made sure I did not ever come near a window for fear that passersby might see a very different looking child. I slept in Mima’s bed and she kept a knife under her pillow vowing to kill any Nazi who might come to get me. But what I remember most, is being surrounded by love and laughter."

Johannes Madna, Tolé's son and Alfred's playmate, suggested what his father's motives were in helping Alfred, saying, "my father was a peaceful man, though a man who didn't like to take risks...perhaps he could not turn away from the helplessness and innocence of a baby...[still], it surprised me, too." When others asked Tolé on why he sheltered Alfred, Tolé responded "What else was I to do.”

Alfred stayed safe with the Madna household for three years, surviving German searches and the war, until the liberation of the Netherlands in 1945. The rest of the Münzer family did not fare so well; Eva and Leah were betrayed and deported to Auschwitz on 8 February 1944, where they were soon killed. Both Gitla and Simche were also found and deported, with Simche dying soon after liberation. Gitla survived, and was reunited with Alfred in August 1945.

Tolé and the rest of the Madna family (minus Mima, who died sometime in 1945) kept in contact with Alfred and Gitla Münzer after the war ended. Alfred last saw Tolé in 1992, who said as his parting words "be careful, my son, and take good care of your mother." Tolé died on 9 January 1992.

== Legacy ==
In 1958, the Münzers immigrated to the United States. Gitla died in 2001, while Alfred became an internist and pulmonologist working in Washington, D.C. On 12 January 2003, Yad Vashem posthumously recognized both Tolé Madna and Mima Saïna as Righteous Among the Nations. They are the first, and so far the only, Indonesians who have been honored as such.
