= Manuel Muñoz Borrero =

Righteous Among the Nations, diplomat

- Born: 4 February 1891; Cuenca, Ecuador
- Died: 5 October 1976 (aged 85); Mexico
- Occupation: Diplomat
- Known for: Righteous Among the Nations

Manuel Muñoz Borrero (4 February 1891 – 5 October 1976) was an Ecuadorian diplomat who issued some 100 Ecuadorian passports to save Jews during the Holocaust. He is the only Ecuadorian to be recognized by Yad Vashem as a Righteous among the Nations.

== Biography ==
Manuel Muñoz Borrero was born in Cuenca, Ecuador in 1891. In 1931, he began working as a consul in Stockholm, Sweden. After Nazi Germany had invaded most of Europe by 1941, Muñoz Borrero issued around 80 passports to Poles, many of them Jewish. By a presidential decree, the Ecuadorian government relieved him of his duties in January 1942; however, the diplomatic seals and archives remained in Muñoz Borrero's possession, as the Swedish authorities did not confiscate them as requested by the Ecuadorian government. Despite being terminated, Muñoz Borrero continued to issue passports to Jews in occupied Europe.

Research by historian Efraim Zadoff, drawing on the archive of Rabbi Abraham Israel Jacobson, an Orthodox rabbi active in Stockholm's Jewish community, indicates that the passport scheme was initiated and largely organized by a group of associates around Jacobson known as the "Jeschurun Group". In this account, Muñoz Borrero's role, while indispensable, was comparatively passive: he lent his consular authority and signature to documents whose recipients were identified and whose paperwork was prepared mainly by Jacobson and his associates, a practice that continued even after Muñoz Borrero's dismissal in 1942. Jacobson's family archive, now held at Yad Vashem, and a resulting biography are today considered a major source on the passport rescue project, which is estimated to have produced close to 300 such passports in total.

Some though not all who had received Ecuadorian passports managed to escape the Holocaust. One survivor, who credited her survival in Bergen-Belsen concentration camp due to being issued an Ecuadorian passport and later taking part in a prisoner exchange, wrote "I probably would not have survived if not for the passports issued by Mr. Manuel Muñoz Borrero. I am forever grateful to him." After the war, Muñoz Borrero's work remained relatively unknown, and he died in obscurity in 1976, having never been rehabilitated during his lifetime by the Ecuadorian government for his actions during World War II.

It took 34 years after the death of Manuel that Yad Vashem eventually recognized Muñoz Borrero as a Righteous Among the Nations on 28 February 2011. Seven years later in 2018, the Ecuadorian government posthumously restored Muñoz Borrero's credentials, made an official apology to the family of Muñoz Borrero's and acknowledged his work of saving of Jewish lives in World War II.
