= Nikolay Kiselyov (soldier) =

Russian partisan leader and Righteous Among the Nations

Nikolay Yakovlevich Kiselyov (Russian: Николай Яковлевич Киселёв; 1913–1974), also commonly transliterated from the Russian language as Nikolai Kiselev, was a Soviet Red Army commissar, prisoner of war, and partisan leader during World War II.

Kiselyov is best remembered in the West for his work in saving the lives of more than two hundred Jews endangered by the Nazi occupation of Belarus, where he was leading a detachment of the Soviet partisan movement in 1942. Kiselyov was posthumously recognized as one of the Russian Federation's Righteous Among the Nations by Yad Vashem, Israel's national Holocaust memorial, in 2005.

== Biography ==
Nikolay Yakovlevich was born to a peasant Russian family from the rural locality of Bogorodskoye near Ufa, Russian Empire, in 1913.

Kiselyov studied in Leningrad. Following the 22 June 1941 invasion of the Soviet Union by Nazi Germany, he went off to war as a recently graduated student of international commerce in Leningrad and Communist Party member and began serving in the Red Army as a politruk (army political officer) in 1941.

Wounded and taken prisoner by the Germans in a matter of months after the beginning of Operation Barbarossa, Kiselyov survived a brief period in German captivity in spite of the notorious Commissar Order issued by Adolf Hitler prior to the invasion in 1941. Subsequently, escaping to join up with Soviet partisans active in Nazi-occupied Belarus, he became chief of staff of the Pobeda ("Victory") detachment of the Mstitel ("Avenger") partisan battalion, which formed in the summer of 1942 in the forests just north of the Belarusian capital, Minsk.

At the nearby Jewish ghetto of Dolginovo (Daŭhinava), a massacre had been carried out on 5 June 1942 as part of the Nazi "Final Solution", and the Mstitel battalion acquired knowledge of the events. Some five thousand local Jewish men, women, and children had been forcibly collected at the beginning of the German occupation as part of the Nazi implementation of the Holocaust in Belarus. Survivors of the ghetto liquidation process – run-away Jews fleeing from the murders carried out by Nazi forces and their auxiliaries, Nazi collaborators from the nearby Baltic republics of Latvia and Lithuania – were trickling into the forests near Dolginovo throughout the summer of 1942, and their accounts of the Dolginovo atrocities were recounted among the partisan personnel of the Soviet forests.

The partisans' attempt to rescue Dolginovo's Jews began in August 1942, as a reaction to the perilous situation of the refugees who had successfully made their way out of Dolginovo. Of the one-time ghetto population of 5000 people, not more than about 300 were still alive at the time – a number still too large to be supported by the supply line of the partisan units in the Belarusian forests. Kiselyov personally led the remaining survivors to safety behind the Soviet lines, some 1500 kilometers to the east, cognizant of the difficulty of the situation for the large group of people. By November 1942, Kiselyov had succeeded in transferring some 218 people to the rear of the Soviet forces.

Mistaken for a deserter who had come back from the front, Kiselyov was accordingly arrested, but was quickly released at the intervention of the very people he had just rescued. An order personally crediting Kiselyov with the rescue of "210 Belarusian Jewish families" – was issued by the partisan staff on 14 January 1943. A plane carrying a superior's recommendation for an award of the title of Hero of the Soviet Union to Kiselyov – the highest honorary title awarded by the Soviet Union – was shot down during the war; consequently, Kiselyov was never as prominently recognized.

Kiselyov lived in Moscow after the war, and, though taking credit for the rescue in his letters to fellow partisan fighters, did not seek to have his act recognized as something extraordinary or seek public commemoration of his wartime effort.

After further service with the Soviet military, Kiselyov was discharged in 1944. Having met the woman who would become his wife while working with her in the partisan movement, Kiselyov married in 1946, and had one son and one daughter. In Moscow, he worked as an official in the Soviet trade ministry in the post-war period.

Kiselyov died at age 60 in 1974.

== Posthumous recognition ==
Inna Gerasimova, a Belarusian historian sifting through wartime documents at the national archive of the Republic of Belarus, was able to both locate a number of documents confirming Kiselyov's role in the Dolginovo rescue in the 2000s and meet with some of the survivors of the Dolginovo rescue operation. Subsequent recognition of Kiselyov's heroism came from the Israeli Yad Vashem memorial, which in 2005 confirmed Kiselyov as one of the Russian gentiles who performed exceptional work in rescuing Jews by inscribing his name as one of Russia's Righteous Among the Nations in 2005. In Moscow, Kiselyov was posthumously honored by the Ambassador of the State of Israel to the Russian Federation in 2006.

A 2008 Russian-language film, Kiselyov's List, a "documentary drama" focusing on Kiselyov's rescue attempt in 1942, directed by Yuri Malygin and produced by Yakov Kaller of the AB-TV production company in the Russian Federation, was, among other honors, recognized as the best documentary film at the 2008 Listapad Film Festival in Minsk, Belarus, and was described by the Polish Niepokolianow International Catholic Festival as a documentary yielding a "new level of historic truth in presentation of the events of World War II" at its screening on 26 June 2009 in Hlybokaye, Belarus. An American premiere, organized as part of the Miami Jewish Film Festival in Florida, was presented in 2009 and screened before Simon Chevlin – a local resident and a survivor who had met with Gerasimova in the course of her research.

In February 2023, Sergei Ursuliak's film Tzadik (Russian: Праведник; The Righteous) was released, with the role of Nikolay Kiselyov played by Aleksandr Yatsenko.
