= Henk Zanoli =

Dutch resistance fighter and Righteous Among the Nations recipient

- Born: Hendrikus Antonius Zanoli; 23 April 1923; Laren, North Holland, Netherlands
- Died: 9 December 2015 (aged 92); The Hague, Netherlands
- Occupation: Lawyer
- Known for: Saving Jews from the Holocaust during World War II
- Movement: Dutch anti-Nazi resistance
- Awards: Righteous Among the Nations (1950)

Hendrikus Antonius "Henk" Zanoli (born on 21 April 1923 – 9 December 2015) was a Dutch lawyer who was recognized by Israel as one of the Righteous Among the Nations in 1950, with his name being listed at Yad Vashem in the city of Jerusalem. During World War II, he was a member of the Dutch resistance, which was formed to oppose the German occupation of the Netherlands, and was personally involved in smuggling many Jews to protect them amidst the Holocaust. In 2014, Zanoli returned his Righteous Among the Nations medal to the Israeli embassy in The Hague and subsequently wrote to the Israeli ambassador to protest the country's ongoing military actions in Operation Protective Edge: on 20 July of that year, Zanoli's grandniece's Palestinian husband lost six members of his family after an Israeli airstrike destroyed their house in the Gaza Strip.

== Death ==
Zanoli died in The Hague, Netherlands, on 9 December 2015, at the age of 92.

== World War II ==
Zanoli was born in Laren in 1923. During the war, the Zanoli family were involved in the resistance. In 1943, when Zanoli's father had already been arrested by the German occupiers, Zanoli himself smuggled the young Jewish boy Elhanan Pinto from Amsterdam to Eemnes. With his mother Jans, Zanoli kept Pinto in hiding for the rest of the war. While the rest of Pinto's family were killed in the Holocaust, he survived to reach age 72 before dying in Jerusalem in 2007. The resistance work cost Zanoli's father and brother-in-law their lives, while his Jewish sister-in-law was deported and never returned.

== 2014 Gaza War ==
In 2011, Israel recognized Zanoli's mother as one of the Righteous Among the Nations, presenting her with an honorary medal. However, Zanoli, who himself was recognized as Righteous in 1950, returned this medal to Israel during the 2014 Gaza War in order to protest after an Israeli airstrike killed six of his grandniece's in-laws, who were Palestinians living in the Gaza Strip.
