= Pan Junshun =

Chinese Righteous Among the Nations

- 潘均順
- Born: 1889; China
- Died: 1947 (aged 57–58); Kharkiv, Ukrainian SSR, Soviet Union
- Known for: Hiding a Ukrainian Jewish girl from the Nazis during World War II
- Title: Righteous Among the Nations
- Children: 2

Pan Junshun (traditional Chinese: 潘均順; simplified Chinese: 潘均顺; pinyin: Pān Jūnshùn; 1889 – 1947), was the first Chinese national to be awarded the title Righteous Among the Nations for hiding and sheltering a Ukrainian Jewish girl during the occupation of part of the Soviet Union during World War II.

== Life ==
Pan Junshun moved to Russia in 1916 looking for work. He settled in Moscow where he found work as a labourer. A communist, he decided to stay in the Soviet Union. He married and had two sons while living in Moscow, after which he moved to Kharkiv, Ukraine, in 1936. His wife died before the outbreak of World War II.

His two sons were drafted into the Red Army at the beginning of the war; they never returned home and were presumed to have been killed during the war. Pan, however, survived the war and continued to live in Kharkiv until his death in 1947.

== Righteous among the Nations ==
Pan sheltered and hid Ludmilla Genrichovna, a Ukrainian Jewish girl who had escaped from a detention area set up by the occupying German Army. She escaped through the efforts of her mother, who realised that her children were likely to be killed as they were being transferred to another town.
