= Paul Nguyễn Công Anh =

Vietnamese "Righteous Among the Nations"

- Born: 1919
- Died: 2008 (aged 88–89)
- Known for: Helping Jews escape persecution during World War II
- Awards: Righteous Among the Nations; Knight of the Legion of Honour

Paul Nguyễn Công Anh (1919 – 2008) was a Vietnamese national who was classed as a Righteous Among the Nations by Yad Vashem.

== Early life ==
Paul Nguyen was born in Vietnam and immigrated to France, where he attended the University of Nice. There he met fellow student Jadwiga Alfabet, a Jewish refugee from Poland, and became engaged to her.

== Second World War ==
In the summer of 1942, French police began arresting Jews with foreign nationality, including some of Jadwiga's relatives. Paul married Jadwiga on 5 September 1942, in the hope that by gaining French citizenship she would be protected from deportation. The couple then moved to Clermont-Ferrand, returning to Nice in 1943 when that city was in Italian control and relatively safe. However, in September 1943 the Germans re-occupied Nice and danger of deportation returned. From this time Paul Nguyen hid his wife, her uncle and aunt, Jakub and Salome Berliner and their baby son Roland. Obtaining false papers in November 1943, he arranged a people smuggler to take Jakub to Switzerland. He arranged a second journey with Salome Berliner and her infant child.

== Personal life and awards ==
Paul and Jadwiga Nguyen had two daughters together. He was recognized as a Righteous Among the Nations on 30 April 2007. He is the only Vietnamese person recognized with this honour. His other decorations included the Knight of the Legion of Honour.
