= Sorvikha =

Sorvikha Сорвиха
- Selo
- Location within Bashkortostan Location within Russia
- Coordinates: 55°14′N 55°50′E
- Country: Russia
- Region: Bashkortostan
- District: Birsky District
- Time zone: UTC+5:00

Sorvikha (Russian: Сорвиха; Bashkir: Саруа, Sarwa) is a rural locality (a selo) in Kalinnikovsky Selsoviet, Birsky District, Bashkortostan, Russia. The population was 97 as of 2010. There are 5 streets.

== Geography ==
Sorvikha is located 39 km southeast of Birsk (the district's administrative centre) by road. Zuyevo is the nearest rural locality.
