= Odoardo Focherini =

Italian Roman Catholic journalist; Righteous Among Nations

Blessed Odoardo Focherini
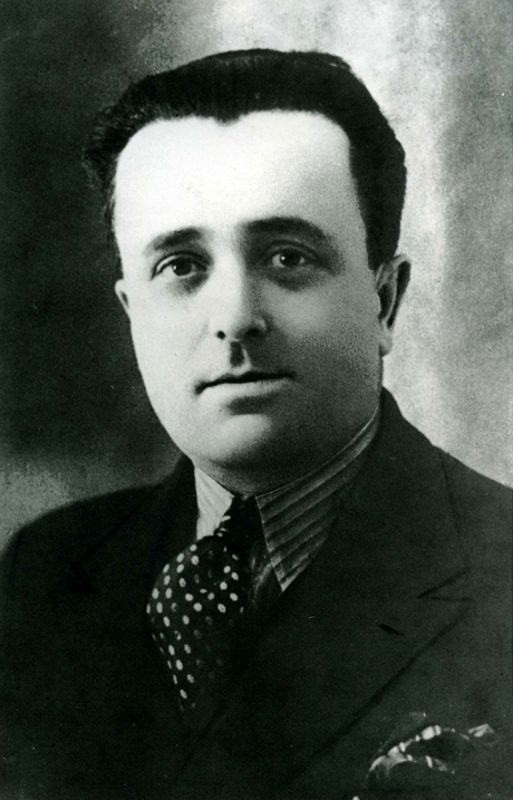

Martyr
- Born: 6 June 1907; Carpi, Modena, Kingdom of Italy
- Died: 27 December 1944 (aged 37); Hersbruck concentration camp, Nazi Germany
- Venerated in: Roman Catholic Church
- Beatified: 15 June 2013, Piazza Martiri, Modena, Italy by Cardinal Angelo Amato
- Feast: 6 June

Odoardo Focherini (sometimes referred to as Edward Focherini; 6 June 1907 – 27 December 1944) was an Italian Roman Catholic journalist. He issued false documents to Jews during World War II in order for them to escape the Nazi regime but was arrested and sent to a concentration camp where he later died. Yad Vashem later recognized him as a Righteous Among the Nations in 1969 for his efforts.

Focherini's beatification was held on 15 June 2013 in Modena under Pope Francis who had Cardinal Angelo Amato preside over the celebration on his behalf.

== Life ==
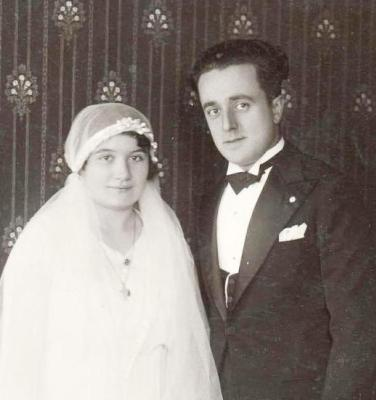
Focherini and his wife at their wedding

Odoardo Focherini was born on 6 June 1907 in Modena as the third son of Tobia Focherini and Maria Bertacchini; his father married Teresa Merigi in 1909 after Focherini's mother died. He had three brothers. Focherini met Maria Marchesi (1909–1989) while he was on vacation in Trento, and they became engaged in 1925. They married on 9 July 1930 and had seven children together between 1931 and 1943. The children in order of birth were: Olga (b. 1931), Maddalena, Attilio (d. 1946), Rodolfo, Gianna, Carla and Paola (b. July 1943). The couple were to have an eighth child (Sandro or Sandra depending on the gender) but this did not happen as Focherini was arrested.

On 1 January 1934, Focherini gained work with the Società Assicurazione Cattolica di Verona, an insurance corporation, and worked as an agent for the Modena branch. In 1933 he left his line of work in order to become a journalist and he became the managing director of L'Avvenire d'Italia. A fellow friend and journalist was the Jewish-Italian Giacomo Lampronti. In 1936 he became the diocesan president of Catholic Action. Pope Pius XI commended Focherini for his work in 1937 and awarded him the Order of Saint Sylvester.

In 1942 his activism in saving the lives of Jews during World War II and the Holocaust first manifested when the first he saved came from Poland on a train to Genoa. On 8 September 1943, he got in touch with people who provided him with blank identification cards with false data and took a group of Jews to the border. He issued this fake documentation to them in order for them to escape Nazi persecution to neutral Switzerland and with his priest friend Dante Sala provided documents on one occasion for his friend Lampronti and his relations. He was also a friend of Teresio Olivelli.

The Nazis discovered this covert operation and arrested him at the Carpi Hospital on 11 March 1944 while he organized the escape of Enrico Donati. On 13 March 1944 he was taken to San Giovanni in Monte prison in Bologna and remained there until 5 July when he was moved to Fossoli.

From there Focherini was sent to a labour camp in Bolzano and remained there until 4 August when he was deported to the German state; he was sent to Flossenbürg on 7 September. Focherini sent a total of 166 letters to his wife while in imprisonment. The Nazis then sent him to a concentration camp in Hersbruck where he later died on 27 December 1944 due to an untreated leg infection while confirmation of his death came later on 4 June 1945.

His final words were reported as: "I declare that I die in the purest Roman Catholic faith and in full submission to the will of God". He had saved a total of 105 Jewish lives.

=== Posthumous recognition ===
The Gold Medal for Civil Merit he received in 2007

In 1969 he received posthumous recognition from Yad Vashem for his heroic efforts during the war in saving the lives of countless Jews and awarded him the title of Righteous Among the Nations.

In 2007 the then-President of the Italian Republic Giorgio Napolitano awarded him the Gold Medal for Civil Merit for his heroic actions during World War II.

== Beatification ==
The beatification cause commenced under Pope John Paul II on 12 February 1996 after he was titled a Servant of God after the Congregation for the Causes of Saints issued the official "nihil obstat" to the cause and allowed for it to commence on a diocesan level; Bishop Bassano Staffieri oversaw its opening on 30 March 1996 and its conclusion on 26 May 1998. The C.C.S. validated this process on 28 May 1999 in Rome.

The postulation drafted and then submitted the Positio to the C.C.S. in 2003 and it allowed for a board of theologians to approve the cause on 16 October 2007 and for the C.C.S. to do so as well on 3 April 2012. Pope Benedict XVI - on 10 May 2012 - confirmed that Focherini had died "in odium fidei" (in hatred of the faith) and thus approved his beatification. Cardinal Angelo Amato presided over the beatification in Modena on 15 June 2013 on the behalf of Pope Francis. Focherini's friend Lampronti attended the beatification.

The current postulator for this cause is the Franciscan priest Giovangiuseppe Califano.
