= José Maria Barreto =

Peruvian diplomat (1875–1948)

- Born: 16 November 1875; Peru
- Died: 11 August 1948 (aged 72); Geneva, Switzerland

José María Barreto Bustíos (16 November 1875 – 11 August 1948) was a Peruvian diplomat in Switzerland who is best known for issuing passports to save Jews during World War II.

== Early life ==
His father, Federico María Barreto served as a colonel in the Peruvian army, while his brother was Federico Barreto, a poet. Barreto himself was known to be very reserved, so much so that his nickname was "el lugubre" (the gloomy).

Barreto lived in Tacna during the Chilean occupation of Peru after the War of the Pacific. As a journalist, he advocated for the Peruvian identity of the territory through writing alongside his brother. In 1911, the Chilean government forced him to leave Tacna, so he moved to Lima and was appointed director of El Peruano. To avoid attracting unwanted attention, his works were published under pseudonyms such as Joseph Marius, René Tupic and Ramón Román.

He was a member of the Royal Academy of History and the Royal Geographical Academy of Madrid, The Academies of History and Geography of Brazil and Bolivia, and the International Law Association of Washington.

His diplomatic career began in 1925, being appointed as general secretary of the Peruvian delegation to Tacna and Arica, which were at the time under the control of Chile. He represented Peru in missions to Mexico, Bolivia, Venezuela, France, Panama, Germany and Switzerland, additionally serving in the Peruvian delegation to the League of Nations.

== Later life ==
In 1938, while working as consul general the government of Peru ordered its consulates in Europe to not give visas to immigrants, singling out Jews. At the request of RELICO, Barreto started to give out passports to Jews in countries under Nazi rule. He later explained that he'd wanted to save human life and believed the Peruvian government would support him.

In 1943, Barreto was caught issuing a passport to a man named Gunther Frank, and when the Swiss authorities confronted him, he revealed he had given out passports to 58 Jews to stop them from being sent to concentration camps. After learning of this, the Peruvian foreign service fired Barreto and cancelled the visas.

Barreto passed away five years later on 11 August 1948. He later was recognized as Righteous Among the Nations in 2014.
