= Ámparo Otero Pappo =

Cuban Righteous Among the Nations (1896–1987)

Amparo de Los Remedios Otero de Pappo (1896–1987) was a Cuban-born milliner who was honored as being among the Righteous Among the Nations by Yad Vashem for saving French Jews during the Holocaust.

Amparo de Los Remedios Otero emigrated with her family from Cuba to France in the late 1920s, settling in Paris to pursue a hatmaking career. A Catholic, she married Jacob Pappo, a Bulgarian Jew, in 1931. They had a son, Charles-Henri, in 1932, and Jacob Pappo died the following year. After World War II began, she relocated with her son to Siran, Cantal. During the war years, Pappo sheltered her husband's family – including her mother-in-law, brother-in-law, sister-in-law, nephews and niece – and a teenage Jewish refugee named Liliane Frangi from arrest and potential deportation to the Nazi death camps.

On 14 July 2011, Yad Vashem recognized Amparo Otero de Pappo as Righteous Among the Nations, making her the first – and, to date, only – Cuban national to be honored.
