= Petar Zanković =

Montenegrin Righteous Among the Nations

- Петар Занковић
- Born: 1 April 1924
- Died: 17 June 2002 (aged 78)

Petar Zanković (1 April 1924 – 17 June 2002) was a Montenegrin man who helped shelter three Jewish families throughout World War II. In 2007, he was recognized as Righteous Among the Nations by Israel.

== World War II ==
During the invasion of Yugoslavia, a Jewish family (the Richters) fled from Zagreb to Belgrade. When the German army and their allies fully took control of the country, Milan Richter took his son, Marjan, to Petar Zanković's home in Italian-controlled Sutomore, Montenegro. Milan had served in World War I with Petar's father, and the families remained in touch over the years. Sometime later, the rest of the family also made the journey to Zanković's home. The Richters did not want to put the Zanković family at risk, so they moved into a hotel in the town of Bar, Montenegro, along with other Jewish refugees from Belgrade.

The Ritchers joined local rebels and during an offensive launched by partisans, Milan Richter was captured and sent to a concentration camp in Klos, Albania. Petar Zanković enlisted the help of a bishop named Dobričić to secure Milan's release, after which the Ritchers moved back in with the Zankovićs. The family stayed there until 1943. In September of that year, Germany took control of territories previously occupied by Italy. In response, Petar moved the Richters first to a monastery in Bar and later to the village of Livari near Bobovište. In February 1944, German intelligence operatives apprehended the Richter family and sent them to the Bergen-Belsen concentration camp. Despite this, the family of five managed to survive until the end of the war.

== Post World War II ==
Adele Richter later visited the Zanković family to thank them for having helped them during the war. At that time, she learned that the Zankovićs had sheltered two more families, which led to the arrests of some members of the Zanković family and various punishments. In December 2006, Petar Zanković was recognized as Righteous Among Nations by Yad Vashem.
