= Ona Šimaitė =

Lithuanian librarian, activist, and Holocaust survivor

- Born: 6 January 1894; Akmenė
- Died: 17 January 1970 (aged 76); Cormeilles-en-Parisis
- Occupation: Librarian, translator
- Awards: Righteous Among the Nations (Lithuania, 1966)

Ona Šimaitė

Ona Šimaitė (6 January 1894 – 17 January 1970) was a Lithuanian librarian at Vilnius University who used her position to aid and rescue Jews in the Vilna Ghetto during World War II. She is recognized as a Righteous Among the Nations.

== Life ==
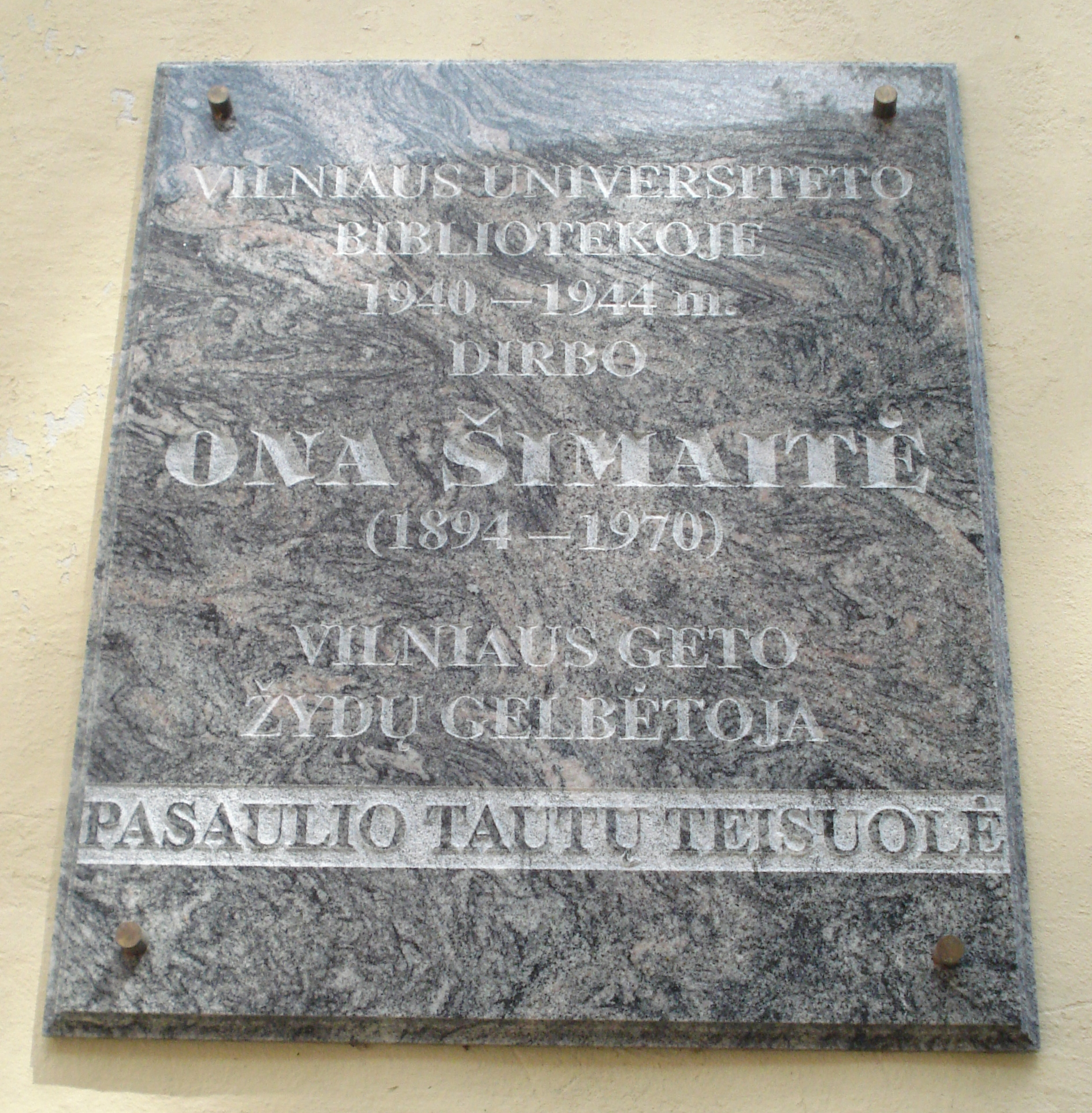
Plaque in Vilnius honoring Šimaitė

Born in Akmenė, Lithuania on 6 January 1894 and later educated in Moscow, Šimaitė became a librarian at Vilnius University in 1940. In 1941, the Nazis invaded Lithuania and created the Vilna Ghetto. She began entering the ghetto under the pretext of recovering library books from Jewish university students. Over the next three years, she smuggled small arms (helped by Kazys Boruta, amongst others) as well as food and other provisions; smuggled out literary and historical documents for the Paper Brigade; and also served as a mail carrier for ghetto inhabitants, connecting them with the outside world. She also found people who would forge documents for Jews, offered her home as a temporary refuge for Jews, and smuggled Jewish children out of the ghetto to families that she found who agreed to hide them.

In April 1944, the Gestapo arrested Šimaitė and tortured her. A ransom paid by the rector of the university spared her from immediate execution, and she was deported to Dachau concentration camp in Germany, then later transferred to an internment camp at Ludelange in France. After the camp was liberated by the Allies, Šimaitė remained in France, working as a librarian, except for a period from 1953 to 1956 spent in Israel.

On 15 March 1966, the Israeli organisation Yad Vashem recognized Šimaitė as a Righteous Among the Nations, planting a tree in her honour.

Šimaitė died outside of Paris on 17 January 1970 and, per her request, her body was donated to science. In 2015, Lithuania's first street named in honor of a Righteous Among the Nations was unveiled in Vilnius; the street is named Šimaitės Street, after Šimaitė.

== Career ==
Šimaitė worked as a cataloger in the Vilnius University Library from 1940-1944. After the war, she moved to Paris and continued to work in a library while corresponding with friends, intellectuals, and public figures around the world. In an October 2, 1957 letter to her friend Marijona Čilvinaitė, Šimaitė referred to librarianship as "the beloved profession." Šimaitė was honored for her lifelong career as a librarian by the American Library Association in 2021.

== Notes ==
This article incorporates text from the United States Holocaust Memorial Museum, and has been released under the GFDL.
