= Antonín Kalina =

Czech prisoner of the Buchenwald concentration camp

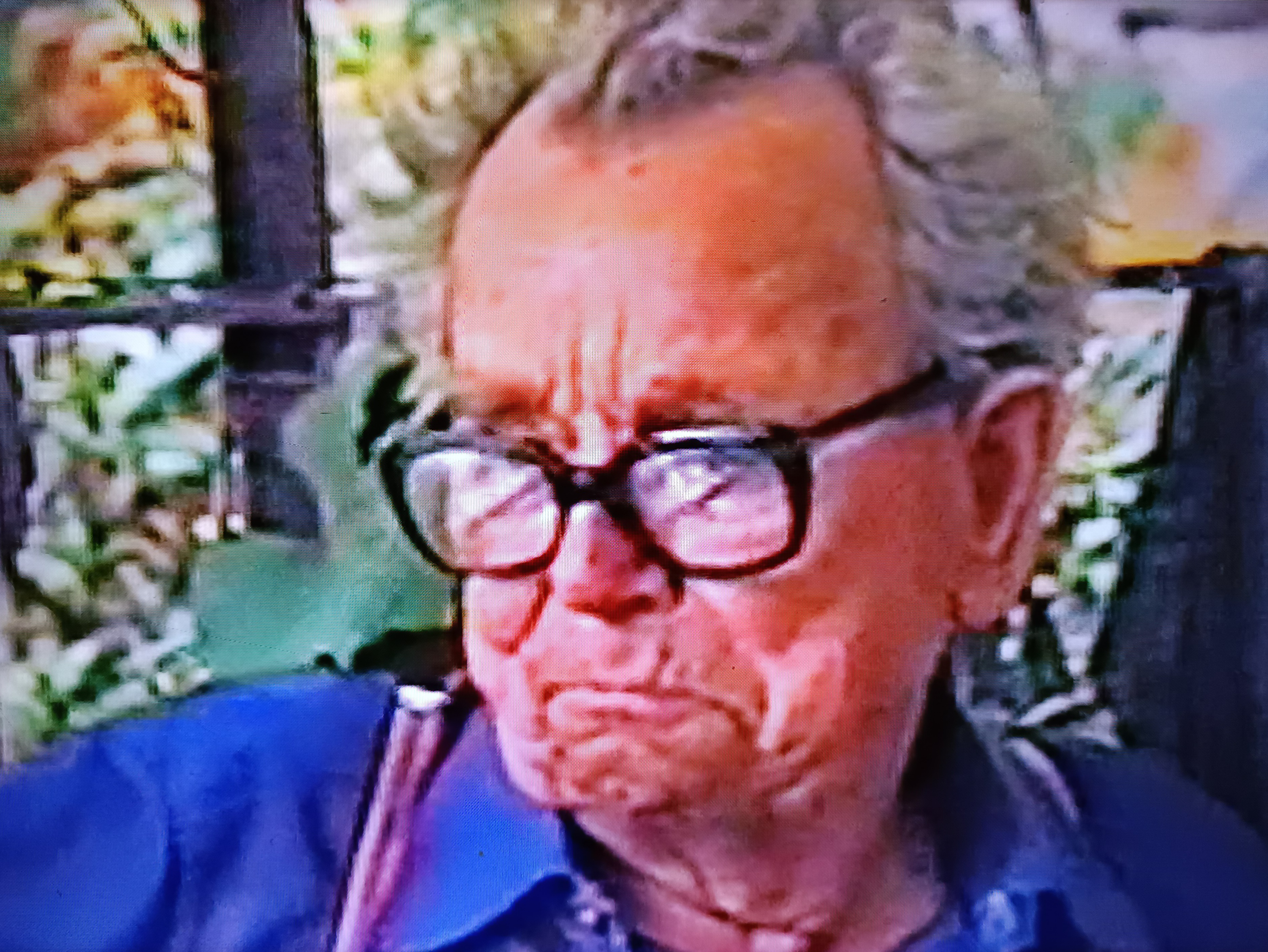
- Born: 17 February 1902; Třebíč, Moravia, Austria-Hungary
- Died: 26 November 1990 (aged 88); Prague, Czechoslovakia
- Resting place: Olšany Cemetery, Prague
- Awards: Righteous Among the Nations (2012), Medal of Merit (2014)

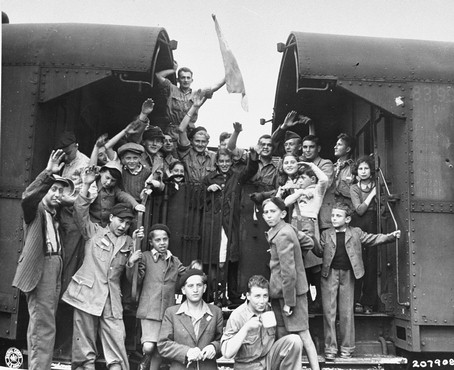
Children leaving Buchenwald after the camp was liberated

Antonin Kalina (17 February 1902 – 26 November 1990) was a Czechoslovak citizen who was imprisoned during World War II in the Buchenwald concentration camp. There, he managed to save the lives of over 900 children. As a non-Jew who saved Jews during the Holocaust, he was posthumously awarded the title Righteous Among the Nations in 2012. The Czech president Miloš Zeman awarded him with Medal of Merit two years later.

== Biography ==
Kalina was born on 17 February 1902 in Třebíč as one of twelve children of a shoemaker and he himself learnt this craft. He was raised in considerable poverty and which led him to become a Communist. He was arrested by the Nazis in 1939 due to his membership in Communist Party. He was initially imprisoned in Dachau and then in Buchenwald.

The Germans started to destroy the concentration camps in Eastern Europe as Red Army advanced. The remaining prisoners were sent on death marches to other camps farther west. Some of them reached Buchenwald where Kalina was imprisoned. Around 100,000 people came to Buchenwald in 1944–1945. Many of them were children. The children included many young boys aged 12–16 from all over Europe.

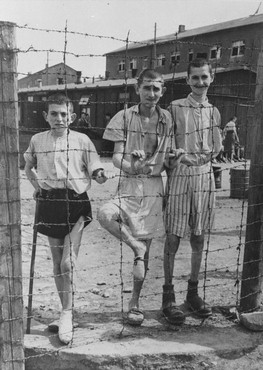
Saved Jewish children from Buchenwald

A "Communist resistance" was already operation in the camp. To protect the most vulnerable prisoners from the harsh conditions of the camp, it housed them in buildings which it claimed was a quarantine area for prisoners with communicable diseases such as typhus. The Germans did not like to enter this area for fear of disease. Kalina used his position in the camp's resistance to become a respected elder of Block 66, which people started to call the Kinderblock ("children's block"). Kalina, his deputy Gustav Schiller and other co-workers started to relocate the boys to the Block. They tried to make their stay in the camp less uncomfortable. They managed to spare the younger children the hard work and physical abuse routine in the camp. Kalina also managed to get them better blankets and, sometimes, additional food. He also organised lessons for them. When the front approached the camp, all Jews were ordered to convene but Kalina falsified the documents of the Jewish boys and hid their Yellow badges. When SS men came for the prisoners, Kalina persuaded them that there were no Jews in the Block.

Kalina returned to Czechoslovakia after the war. He lived and worked in Prague. He was not recognised during his lifetime as he never talked about his actions during the war and boys he had saved did not like to talk about their experiences. Kalina died in Prague on 26 November 1990.

== Legacy ==
Kalina was recognized as a Righteous Among the Nations on 3 June 2012 due to the efforts of some of "Kalina's Children", the American Historian Kenneth Waltzer and the release of the document Kinderblock 66: Return to Buchenwald that told story of Kalina and the boys he had saved. Three of the boys saved by Kalina were present at the Righteous Among the Nations awarding ceremony.

Czech President Miloš Zeman awarded Kalina the Medal of Merit, First Grade, on 28 September 2014.
