= Righteous Among the Nations =

Non-Jews who saved Jews during the Holocaust

The Righteous Among the Nations (Hebrew: חֲסִידֵי אֻמּוֹת הָעוֹלָם, romanized: ḥasidei ummot ha'olam) is an honorific used by the State of Israel to describe all of the non-Jews who, out of altruism, risked their lives in order to save Jews from being exterminated by Nazi Germany during the Holocaust. The term originates from the concept of ger toshav, a legal term used to refer to non-Jewish observers of the Seven Laws of Noah.

== Endowment ==
=== Criteria of the Knesset ===
When Yad Vashem, the Holocaust Martyrs' and Heroes' Remembrance Authority, was established in 1953 by the Knesset, one of its tasks was to commemorate the "Righteous Among the Nations". The Righteous were defined as non-Jews who risked their lives to save Jews during the Holocaust.

Since 1963, a commission headed by a justice of the Supreme Court of Israel has been charged with the duty of awarding the honorary title "Righteous Among the Nations". Guided in its work by certain criteria, the commission meticulously studies all documentation including evidence by survivors and other eyewitnesses, evaluates the historical circumstances and the element of risk to the rescuer, and then decides if the case meets the criteria. Those criteria are:

- Only a Jewish party can put forward a nomination.
- Helping a family member or helping a Jew who converted to Christianity is not ground for recognition.
- Assistance has to be repeated or substantial.
- Assistance has to be given without any financial gain expected in return (although covering expenses such as food is acceptable).

The award has been given without regard to the social rank of the helper. It has been given to royalty such as Princess Alice of Battenberg, Queen Mother Helen of Romania and Queen Elisabeth of Belgium but also to others like the philosopher Jacques Ellul, Salvadoran diplomat José Castellanos Contreras, German industrialist Oskar Schindler, Polish singer Mieczysław Fogg, Amsterdam department store employee Hendrika Gerritsen, and Italian Roman Catholic priest Father Rufino Niccacci.

=== Reception in Jerusalem ===
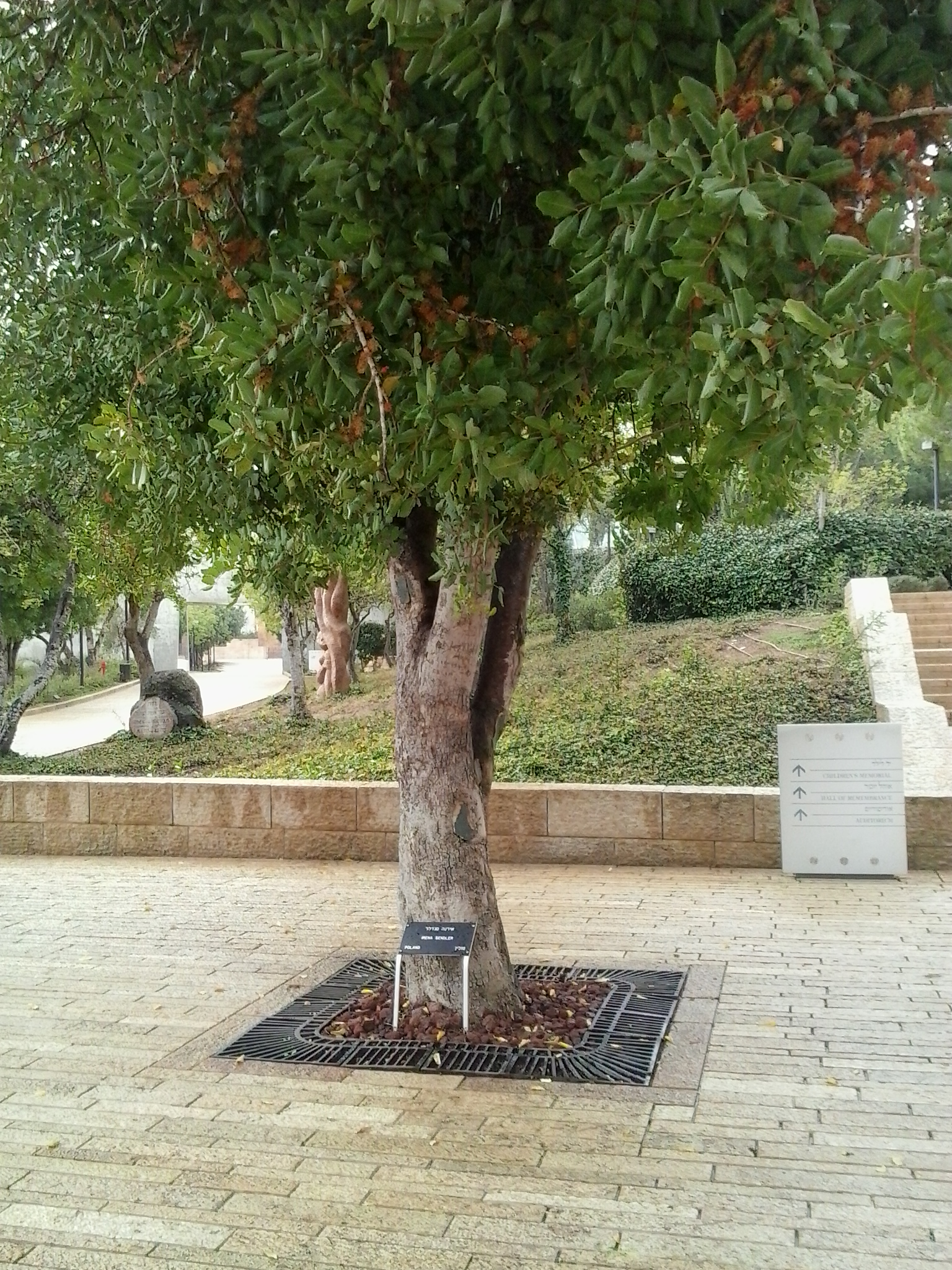
Memorial tree in Jerusalem, Israel, honoring Irena Sendler, a Polish Roman Catholic nurse who saved 2,500 Jews

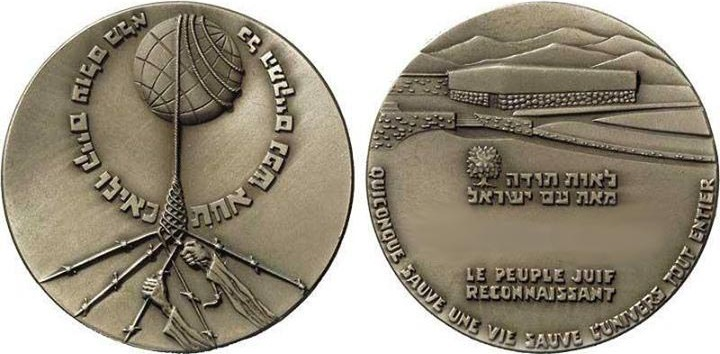
Obverse (left) and reverse (right) of the Righteous Medal

A person who is recognized as Righteous for having taken risks to help Jews during the Holocaust is awarded a medal in their name, a certificate of honor, and the privilege of having the name added to those on the Wall of Honor in the Garden of the Righteous at Yad Vashem in Jerusalem (the last is in lieu of a tree planting, which was discontinued for lack of space). The awards are distributed to the rescuers or their next of kin during ceremonies in Israel, or in their countries of residence through the offices of Israel's diplomatic representatives. These ceremonies are attended by local government representatives and are given wide media coverage.

==== Israeli citizenship and legal benefits ====
The Yad Vashem Law authorizes Yad Vashem "to confer honorary citizenship upon the Righteous Among the Nations, and if they have died, the commemorative citizenship of the State of Israel, in recognition of their actions". Anyone who has been recognized as "Righteous" is entitled to apply to Yad Vashem for the certificate. If the person is no longer alive, their next of kin is entitled to request that commemorative citizenship be conferred on the Righteous who has died.

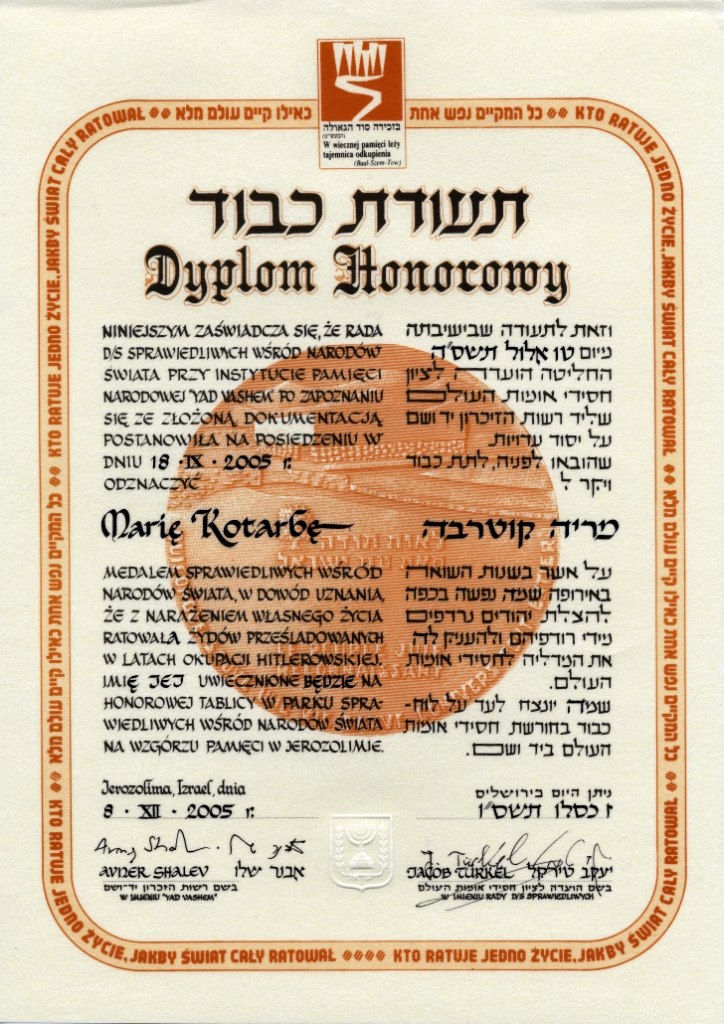
The Righteous Diploma of Maria Kotarba

In total, 28,486 (as of 1 January 2023) men and women from 51 countries have been recognized, amounting to more than 10,000 authenticated rescue stories. Yad Vashem's policy is to pursue the program for as long as petitions for this title are received and are supported by evidence that meets the criteria.

Recipients who choose to live in the State of Israel are entitled to a pension equal to the average national wage and free health care, as well as assistance with housing and nursing care.

== Recipients settled in Israel ==
At least 130 Righteous non-Jews have settled in Israel. They were welcomed by Israeli authorities, and were granted citizenship. In the mid-1980s they became entitled to special pensions. Some of them had settled in British Mandatory Palestine before Israel's establishment shortly after World War II, or in the early years of Israel, while others came later. Those who came earlier often spoke fluent Hebrew and have integrated into Israeli society. Children and grandchildren of Righteous Gentiles are entitled to a temporary residence visa in Israel, but not Israeli citizenship.

== Non-Jewish initiatives for the Righteous ==
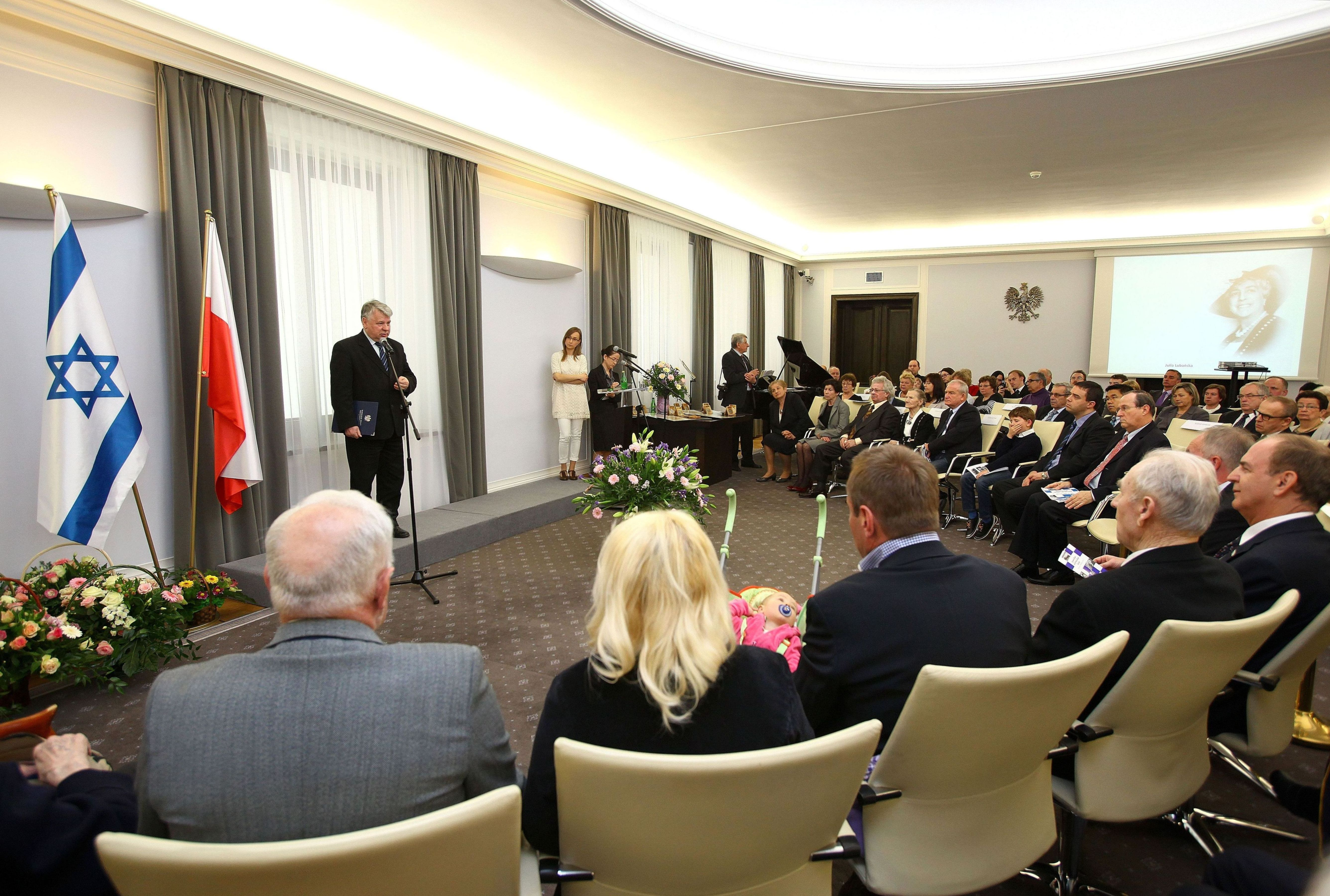
A Righteous Among the Nations award ceremony in the Polish Senate, 2012

=== Christian honours ===
One Righteous Among the Nations, Saint Elizabeth Hesselblad of Sweden, has been canonized a saint in the Catholic Church. Eight others have been beatified: Giuseppe Girotti and Odoardo Focherini of Italy, Klymentiy Sheptytsky of Ukraine, Bernhard Lichtenberg of Germany, Sára Salkaházi of Hungary (and with origins in Košice, Slovakia), Pavol Peter Gojdič of Slovakia, and Józef and Wiktoria Ulma of Poland (together with their children).

Maria Skobtsova of Paris and her companions are recognised as martyrs in the Eastern Orthodox Church. Her feast day is 20 July.

When Algerian Catholic nun Marguerite Bernes was recognised by the Israeli Holocaust memorial centre Yad Vashem as Righteous Among the Nations in 1974, she said of this honour that "we simply did our duty."

Giuseppina De Muro, an Italian Catholic nun who saved over 500 people from deportation to concentration camps, was declared Righteous Among the Nations in 2024.

=== Secular honours ===
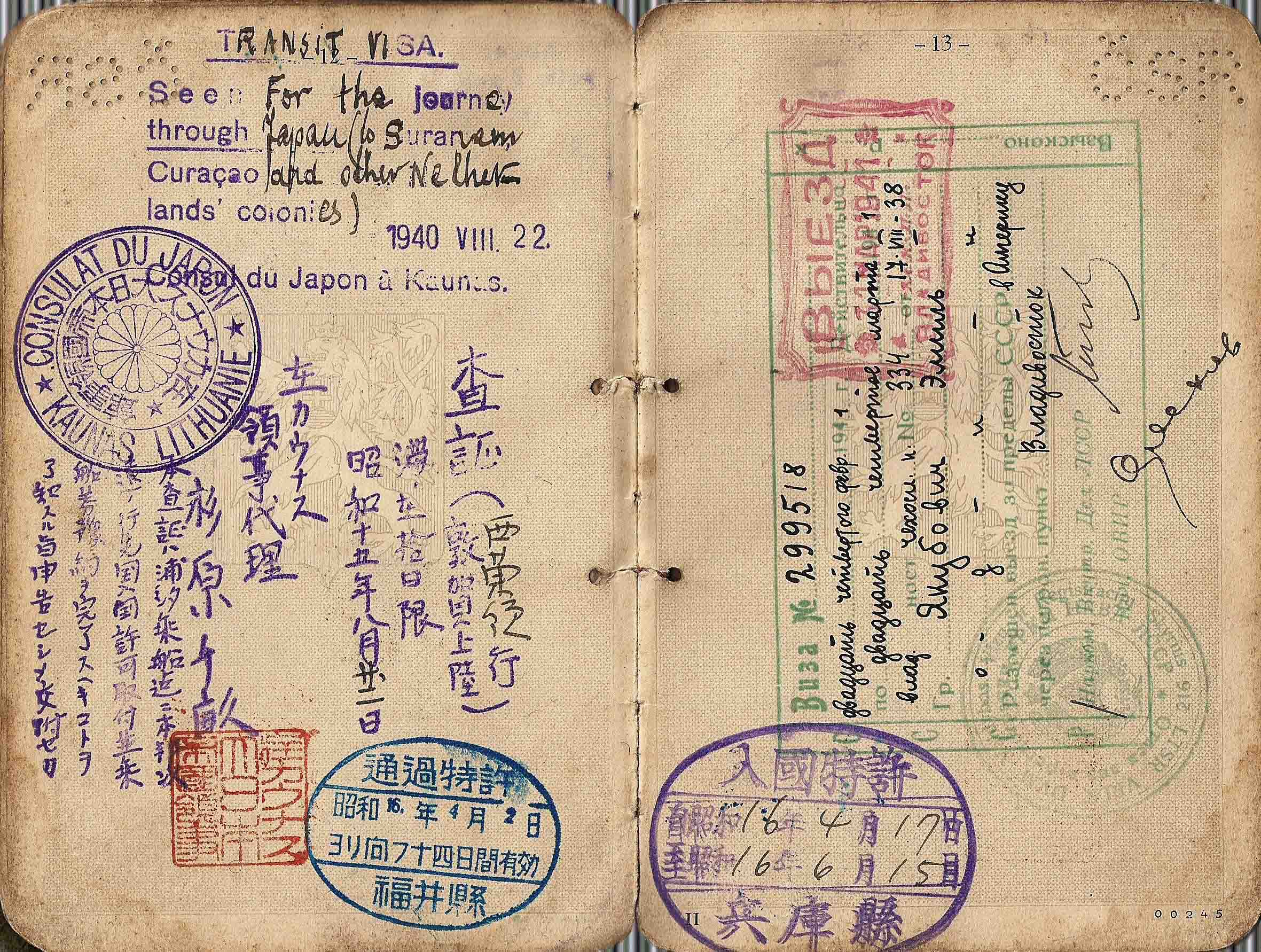
1940-issued visa by Consul Chiune Sugihara in Lithuania

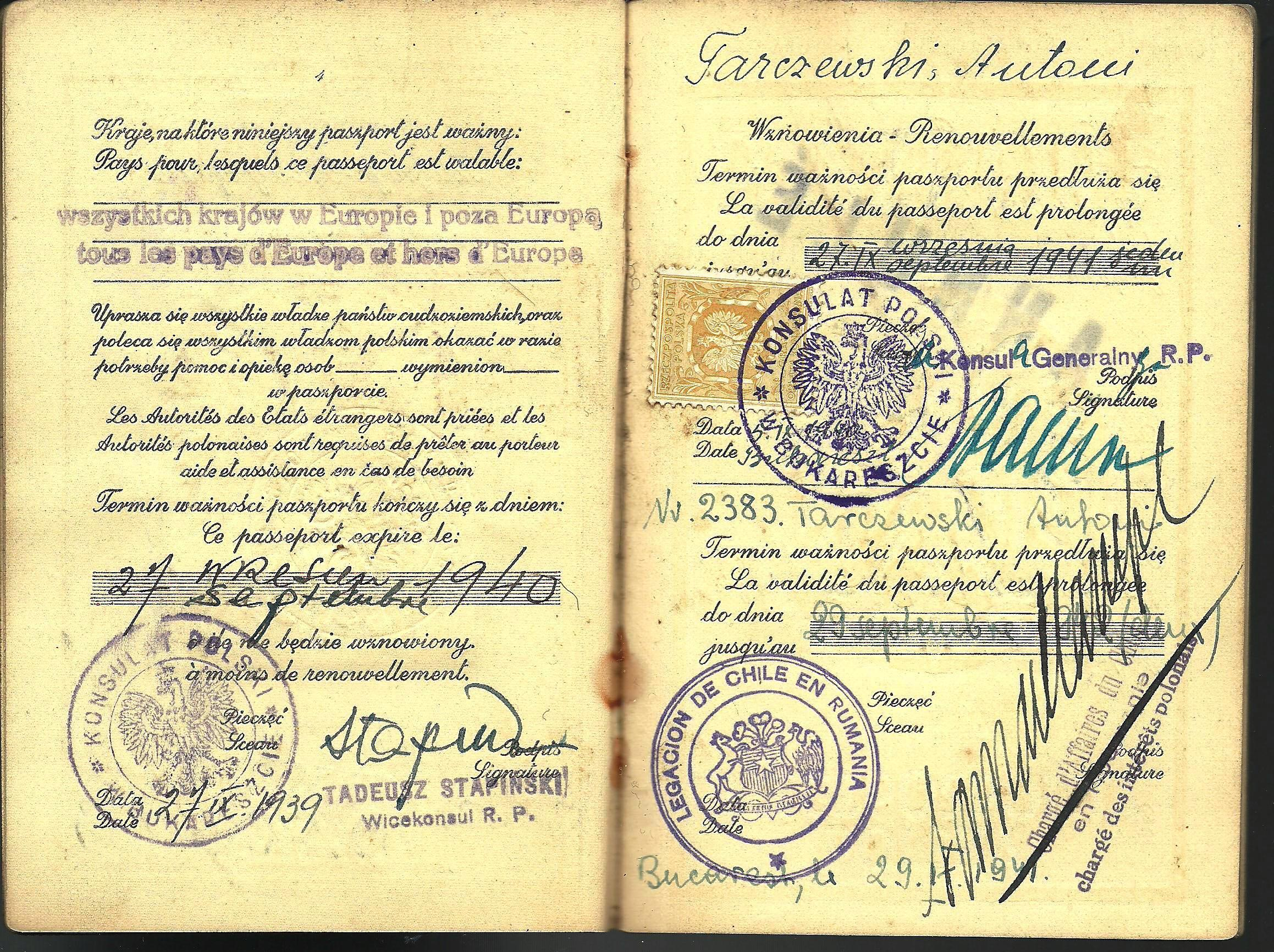
Polish passport extended in 1941 by Righteous Among the Nations Chilean diplomat Samuel del Campo

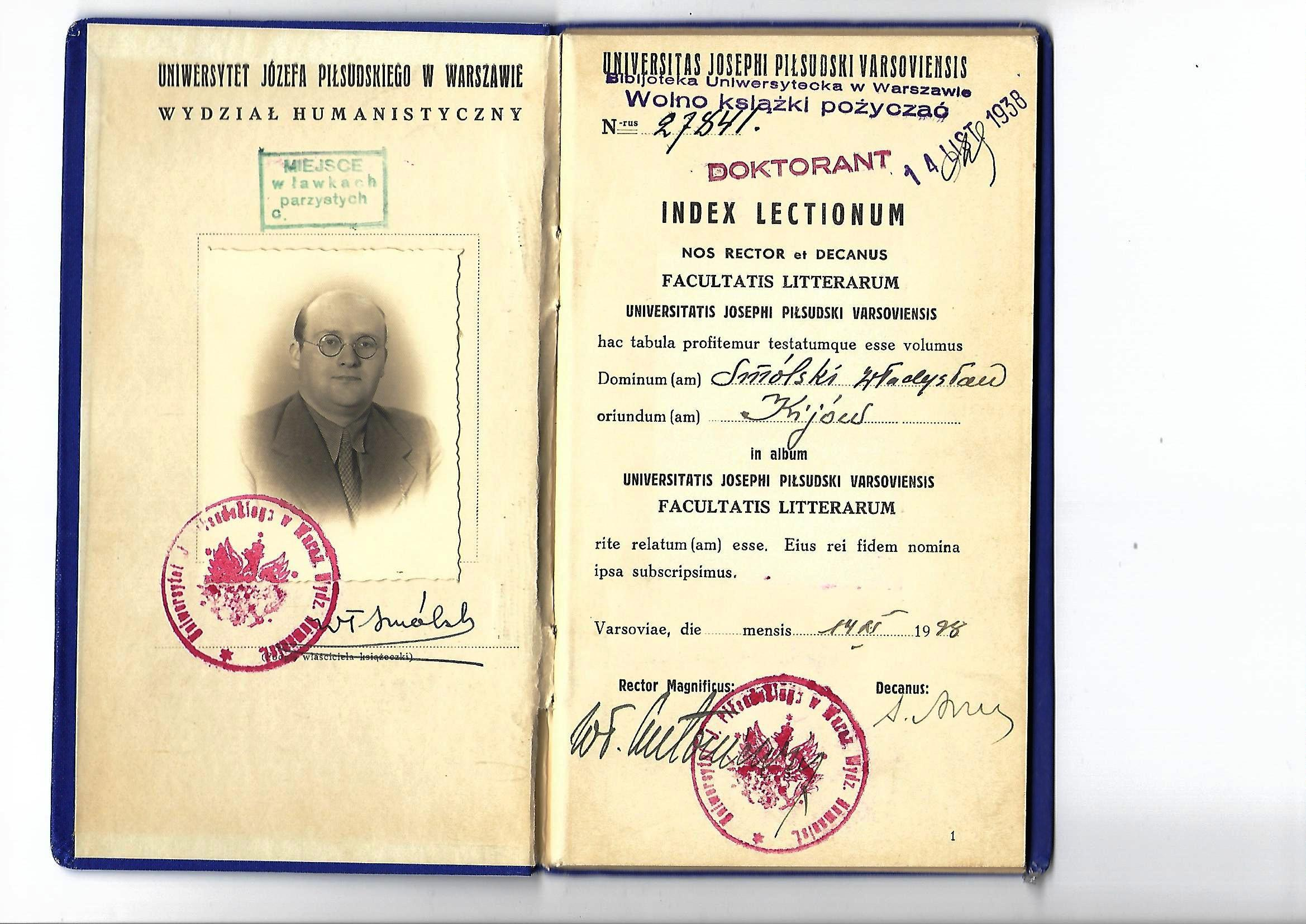
University study booklet issued to Polish Righteous Among the Nations Wladyslaw Smolski in 1938

In 2015, Lithuania's first street sign honoring a Righteous Among the Nations was unveiled in Vilnius. The street is named Onos Šimaitės gatvė, after Ona Šimaitė, a Vilnius University librarian who helped and rescued Jewish people in the Vilna Ghetto.

In Zvolen, Slovakia, the Park of Generous Souls commemorates the Righteous Among the Nations from Slovakia.

Beginning in 2018, China's most significant World War II museum, the War of Resistance Museum, features China's Righteous Among the Nations and other Chinese figures who helped Jews escape Europe.

== Number of awards by country ==
As of 1 January 2024, the award has been made to 28,707 people. Yad Vashem emphasises that the table is not representative of the effort or proportion of Jews saved per country, and notes that these numbers "are not necessarily an indication of the actual number of rescuers in each country, but reflect the cases that were made available to Yad Vashem."

Country	Number of awards	Notable recipients
Poland	7,318	Andrzej Bogucki, Jan Karski, Maria Kotarba, Irena Sendler, Irena Adamowicz, Benedykt Kraskowski, Irene Gut Opdyke
Netherlands	6,137	Willem Arondéus, Corrie ten Boom, Casper ten Boom, Betsie ten Boom, Miep Gies, Frits Philips, Johan van Hulst, Gerrit van der Veen, Bep Voskuijl, Henk Zanoli, Jan Zwartendijk, Hannie Schaft, Walraven van Hall, Elisabeth Hermsen.
France	4,303	Anne Beaumanoir, Jeanne Brousse, André and Magda Trocmé
Ukraine	2,713	Klymentiy Sheptytsky
Belgium	1,819	Queen Elisabeth of Belgium
Lithuania	924	Ona Šimaitė, Kazys Binkis, Sofija Kymantaitė-Čiurlionienė, Kazys Grinius
Hungary	887	Endre Szervánszky, Sára Salkaházi
Italy	810	Carlo Angela, Gino Bartali, Giuseppina De Muro, Giuseppe Girotti, Odoardo Focherini, Giorgio Perlasca, Lorenzo Perrone
Belarus	683	
Germany	666	Oskar Schindler, Wilm Hosenfeld, Hans von Dohnanyi, Bernhard Lichtenberg, Gustav Schröder, Karl Plagge, Maria von Maltzan
Slovakia	639	Pavel Peter Gojdič
Greece	365	Queen Helen, Queen Mother of Romania, Princess Alice of Battenberg, Damaskinos of Athens, Chrysostomos Dimitriou, Loukas Karrer
Russia	231	Nikolay Kiselyov, Fedor Mikhailichenko, Maria Skobtsova
Serbia	141	
Latvia	138	Jānis Lipke
Croatia	133	Ivan Vranetić
Czech Republic	129	Victor Kugler
Austria	115	Ella Lingens, Kurt Lingens, Karl Motesiczky
Moldova	79	
Albania	75	Arslan Rezniqi
Romania	69	Queen Helen, Queen Mother of Romania
Norway	68	
Bosnia and Herzegovina	49	Nurija Pozderac, Derviš Korkut
Switzerland	49	Paul Grüninger, Carl Lutz
Armenia	24	
Denmark (Note: While the title of Righteous is awarded to individuals, not groups, the Danish resistance viewed the Rescue of the Danish Jews as a collective act, and asked Yad Vashem not to recognize resistance members individually. Yad Vashem respected the request, and hence the number of Danish Righteous is relatively small.)	22	Danish resistance movement
United Kingdom	22	Frank Foley, Sofka Skipwith, Jane Haining
Bulgaria	20	Dimitar Peshev, Stefan I of Bulgaria, Cyril of Bulgaria, Pavel Gerdjikov
Slovenia	16	
North Macedonia	10	
Sweden	10	Raoul Wallenberg, Elizabeth Hesselblad
Spain	9	Ángel Sanz Briz, Eduardo Propper de Callejón
United States	5	Varian Fry, Martha Sharp, Waitstill Sharp, Roddie Edmonds, Lois Gunden
Estonia	3	Uku Masing
Indonesia	3	Tole Madna
Peru	3	José Maria Barreto
Portugal	3	Aristides de Sousa Mendes, Carlos Sampaio Garrido
Brazil	2	Luis Martins de Souza Dantas, Aracy de Carvalho
Chile	2	Samuel del Campo, Maria Edwards McClure
China	2	Ho Feng-Shan, Pan Junshun
Cuba	1	Ámparo Otero Pappo
Ecuador	1	Manuel Muñoz Borrero
Egypt	1	Mohammed Helmy
El Salvador	1	José Castellanos Contreras
Georgia	1	Sergei Metreveli
Ireland	1	Mary Elmes
Japan	1	Chiune Sugihara
Luxembourg	1	Victor Bodson
Montenegro	1	Petar Zanković
Turkey	1	Selahattin Ülkümen
Vietnam	1	Paul Nguyễn Công Anh

== See also ==
- British Hero of the Holocaust
- Called by Name
- European Day of the Righteous
- Individuals and groups assisting Jews during the Holocaust
- List of Righteous Among the Nations by country
- Righteousness
- Virtuous pagan
- Żegota

== Bibliography ==
- The Encyclopedia of the Righteous Among the Nations – Rescuers of Jews During the Holocaust, Editor-in-Chief: Israel Gutman. ISBN 0976442582. Yad Vashem
- The Heart Has Reasons: Holocaust Rescuers and Their Stories of Courage, Mark Klempner, ISBN 0-8298-1699-2, The Pilgrim Press.
- Righteous Gentiles of the Holocaust: Genocide and Moral Obligation, David P. Gushee, ISBN 1-55778-821-9, Paragon House Publishers.
- The Lexicon of the Righteous Among the Nations, Yad Vashem, Jerusalem. (volumes: Poland, France, Netherlands, Belgium, Europe I, Europe II).
- To Save a Life: Stories of Holocaust Rescue, Land-Weber, Ellen, ISBN 0-252-02515-6, University of Illinois Press.
- The Seven Laws of Noah, Lichtenstein, Aaron, New York: The Rabbi Jacob Joseph School Press, 1981, ASIN B00071QH6S.
- The Image of the Non-Jew in Judaism, Novak, David, ISBN 0-88946-975-X, Lewiston, New York: Edwin Mellen Press, 1983.
- The Path of the Righteous: Gentile Rescuers of Jews During the Holocaust, Paldiel, Mordecai, ISBN 0-88125-376-6, KTAV Publishing House, Inc.
- Among the Righteous: Lost Stories from the Holocaust's Long Reach into Arab Lands, Robert Satloff, Washington Institute for Near East Policy, (PublicAffairs, 2006) ISBN 1-58648-399-4.
- When Light Pierced the Darkness: Christian Rescue of Jews in Nazi-Occupied Poland, Tec, Nechama, ISBN 0-19-505194-7, Oxford University Press.
- Zegota: The Council to Aid Jews in Occupied Poland 1942–1945, Tomaszewski, Irene & Werbowski, Tecia, ISBN 1-896881-15-7, Price-Patterson.
- "Tolerance in Judaism: The Medieval and Modern Sources", Zuesse, Evan M., in: The Encyclopaedia of Judaism, edited by Jacob Neusner, A. Avery-Peck, and W.S. Green, second edition, ISBN 90-04-14787-X, Leiden: Brill Publishers, 2005, Vol. IV: 2688–2713.
- When Courage Was Stronger Than Fear: Remarkable Stories of Christians Who Saved Jews from the Holocaust by Peter Hellman, second edition, ISBN 1-56924-663-7, Marlowe & Company, 1999.
- Rescue and Flight: American Relief Workers Who Defied the Nazis, Subak, Susan Elisabeth, University of Nebraska Press, 342 pp., 2010.
- Ugo G. Pacifici Noja e Silvia Pacifici Noja, Il cacciatore di giusti: storie di non ebrei che salvarono i figli di Israele dalla Shoah, Cantalupa Torinese, Effatà, 2010, (in Italian), ISBN 978-88-7402-568-8.
- Paul Greveillac, Les fronts clandestins : quinze histoires de Justes (in French), Nicolas Eybalin publishing, 2014 (ISBN 978-2-36665-000-6).
