= Refugee workers in Vichy France =

Aspect of France during World War II

France in World War II. The "Free Zone" is also called Vichy France.

Refugee workers in Vichy France describes the work and lists the expatriates from several countries who assisted refugees in Vichy France during World War II, mostly from 1940 to 1942. As most European countries and British commonwealth countries such as Canada and Australia were engaged in the war, Americans and American humanitarian organizations became prominent in the task of providing aid to refugees fleeing Nazi Germany and German-controlled countries and seeking safety. Prior to the U.S. entry into World War II, "an American passport gave most Americans abroad a reasonably justified sense of invulnerability." Organizations from neutral Switzerland also assisted refugees. The refugee organizations employed or took on volunteers of many nationalities, including French people resident in Vichy.

Many of the international refugee organizations came to France to aid people interned in several refugee camps in southern France. By 1942 the refugee organizations realized that Jews were the most endangered group among the diverse nationalities and ethnicities that made up the refugee population. Refugee workers and organizations became involved in helping refugees escape France. The protection and escape, legal or illegal, of Jewish children became the top priority of many organizations. Six thousand children, mostly Jewish, were sheltered by French families or in group homes and survived the war. Among the people who helped refugees were diplomats of several countries who issued visas, often against the regulations of their home countries, to refugees enabling them to leave France for safety in other countries.

During the same period in which humanitarian organizations in Vichy France were assisting refugees fleeing Nazi Germany, escape and evasion lines, such as the Comet Line and the Pat O'Leary Line, were helping Allied soldiers and downed airmen evade German capture and walk across the Pyrenees into neutral Spain. The British covert agency called the Special Operations Executive also had agents crossing the Spanish border. Vichy France was a mixing bowl of different nationalities and organizations with various, often conflicting, interests and activities.

== Background ==
France's traditional view of itself as the "home of universal rights and the refuge for the persecuted in Europe" eroded in the 1930s as a result of large numbers of refugees fleeing communist rule in the Soviet Union, Nazi rule in Germany, and the defeat of the Republican faction in the Spanish Civil War. In the 1920s, after the Russian Revolution, seventy to eighty thousand Russians resettled in France. In 1933, during the first year of Nazi rule in Germany, 59,000 refugees fled Germany for France of which 85 percent were estimated to be Jewish. The outflow of both Jews and anti-Nazis from Germany continued. By summer 1940, the Jewish population of France was estimated at 350,000 of which less than one-half were French citizens. The refugee population was augmented by La Retirada in 1939 in which more than 400,000 Spanish Republican refugees fled to France after their defeat in the Spanish Civil War. The Spanish refugees anticipated a better reception than they received. Most returned to Spain or were resettled elsewhere but, at the end of 1939, between 160,000 and 180,000 Spanish refugees remained in France. Additional anti-Nazi refugees also arrived in France from countries coming under control of Germany such as Austria, Czechoslovakia, and Poland.

The large-scale flows of refugees, the economic hardships and unemployment of the Great Depression, and Antisemitism contributed to more restrictive policies by the French government during the 1930s. Right wing political parties grew in influence. In 1938, several decrees by the French government denied rights to refugees and authorized the government to set up internment camps for "undesirable" foreigners. During World War II after the defeat of France by Germany in June 1940, the collaborationist Vichy government of southern France enacted nationalistic and antisemitic laws. The aim of Vichy was to reinvigorate the country and exclude those, especially foreigners, Jews, Romani (gypsies), homosexuals, and communists, who it considered harmful to the renewal of what they saw as the traditional values of France. The collaboration of the Vichy French with Nazi Germany led to the deportation of tens of thousands of refugees, mostly Jews, from Vichy and their deaths in German concentration camps.

The legal process of getting a refugee out of France was complex. Many refugee workers spent their time with paperwork rather than clandestine adventures. To leave France required an exit permit from the Vichy government, entry visas from Spain and Portugal and a visa to an onward destination, most commonly the United States. All of this required both time and money. Several individuals and organizations chose to smuggle refugees out of France with false documents. The refugee workers and organizations had a wide range of philosophies ranging from strict-neutrality and abiding by Vichy laws to anti-Nazi activists who helped vulnerable people escape France by any means possible. Some diplomats were obstructive, following the letter of the law and bureaucratic and slow in issuing visas; others from several countries were more creative and skirted the laws of their own countries.

Some of the refugee workers and organizations focused on providing aid to the internees in squalid camps scattered around Vichy France; others had the objective of rescuing people vulnerable to persecution by Vichy and its German overlords. With the deportation to Germany of Jewish refugees beginning in 1942, the plight of refugee children separated by choice or chance from their parents who had been deported or soon would be deported became the top priority of some organizations. About six thousand children were housed in group homes or given false names and histories and lived with cooperating French families. As the Germans intensified their hunt for Jews in Vichy France, many of the children were smuggled into Spain.

Regarding the Jews, historian Julian Jackson said, "For 150 years the Jews of France had looked to the State to protect them if necessary from the anti-Semitic outbursts of civil society; in the Occupation it was civil society that helped protect the Jews from the State. The rescue of Jews was among the first faint glimmerings of resistance to German rule in France. American Donald A. Lowrie, working with the YMCA in Vichy, said in September 1942: "...it must be noted that for the first time since the Armistice [June 1940], deep public feeling has united all the decent elements in France...this feeling gives each one something he can do, and the doing, i.e. aid to hunted Jews, involves resistance to the authorities at Vichy."

The widening of World War II led to the winding down of international efforts to assist refugees. In April 1942, the U.S. embassy in Vichy France advised Americans to leave the country. In November 1942, the Germans occupied Vichy France and ended its semi-independence and U.S. diplomatic representation in Vichy. In January 1943, the Germans and their French collaborators rounded up the few remaining Americans in the country and interned them in Baden-Baden, Germany. In 1944, the interned Americans were exchanged for interned Germans in the United States and were returned to the U.S.. A few of the refugee organizations were able to continue their work with staff recruited locally or from neutral countries or countries occupied by Germany.

== Refugees and internment camps ==
Historian Julian Jackson listed 31 refugee and internment camps established in Vichy France from 1940 to 1942. Some were small, holding only a few dozen people, others were large with thousands of refugees and internees. People in the camps included "Communists and other dissidents, Jews, foreigners, gypsies, black-marketeers (from June 1941), abortionists (from February 1942), and prostitutes (from August 1943)." In November 1940, the camps contained 40,000 people, that number increasing to 50,000 in early 1941. Seventy percent of those in the camps were Jews. About 40,000 foreign, i.e. non-French Jews, were detained in 1940 and 1941 and placed in the camps. There was a constant flux and flow in and out of the camps, especially beginning in August 1942 when deportations of Jews to German concentration camps started.

In the years 1940 through 1942, more than 100,000 refugees of all nationalities, religions, and political persuasions left France, either legally with a visa to another country, most commonly the United States, or illegally by crossing the border into Spain or Switzerland.

== International humanitarian organizations ==
Historian Christopher R. Browning said that 29 humanitarian organizations belonged to the Nimes Committee. Members of the Nimes Committee, chaired by the YMCA's Donald A. Lowrie, coordinated relief efforts for refugees and internees in the camps and secured the release of many internees from the camps.

The Nimes Committee members included international humanitarian organizations, both Jewish and non-Jewish, and French organizations. The international humanitarian organizations operating in Vichy France included the following:

- American Federation of Labor (AFL)
- American Friends Service Committee (Quakers) (AFSC)
- American Joint Distribution Committee (Joint) (JDC)
- American Red Cross (ARC)
- Comité Inter-Mouvements Auprès des Evacués (CIMADE)
- Emergency Rescue Committee (ERC)
- Hebrew Immigrant Aid Society (HIAS, HICEM)
- International Committee of the Red Cross (ICRC)
- Mennonite Central Committee (MCC)
- Oeuvre de Secours aux Enfants (OSE)
- Organisation Réconstruction Travail (ORT)
- Unitarian Service Committee (USC)
- Swiss Red Cross
- Young Men's Christian Association (YMCA)

== Expatriate refugee workers ==
- Richard Allen. ARC.
- Leon (Dick) Ball. ERC. An American resident in France, he led groups of refugees across the Pyrenees to Spain. He disappeared, fate unknown.
- Hiram "Harry" Bingham IV was an American Vice Consul in Marseilles from 1939 to 1941. During the 13 months he was the visa officer he issued between 7,500 and 10,000 visas to the United States, the majority of them to refugees. He violated a Department of State directive that visa officers should investigate applicants before granting visas. Moreover, Bingham issued many visas to "non-famous" refugees rather than the cultural elite who were the more usual clients of American escape organizations. Bingham was transferred to Lisbon in the summer of 1941. Denied promotion, he resigned from the Foreign Service of the United States in 1946.
- Frank Bohn was the American Federation of Labor (AFL) representative in Marseilles from August 1940 until October 1940. His mission was financed by the Jewish Labor Committee. In Marseilles, Bohn and Varian Fry agreed that Bohn would smuggle labor leaders, mostly socialists and Jews from eastern European countries, out of France while Fry would focus on helping intellectuals. Bohn's scheme to smuggle labor leaders out by ship failed and he left France after being warned by the U.S. Department of State that it did not approve of his activities.
- Gilberto Bosques Saldívar. Mexican Consulate General.
- Howard L. Brooks. USC.
- Miriam Davenport. ERC.
- Robert Dexter. USC.
- Marian Ebel. ERC.
- Mary Elmes. (1909–2003) AFSC.
- Charles Fawcett was the doorman for the ERC, supervising the long lines of visitors seeking help. Called "Shar-lee' he spoke no French. He was well-liked by the refugees, especially the women.
- Noel Field. USC.
- Lisa Fittko. ERC. Fittko and her husband Hans led refugees over the Pyrenees to Spain, a hazardous undertaking.
- Varian Fry. ERC. Fry was the leader of the ERC in Marseille.
- Mary Jayne Gold. ERC.
- Lois Gunden. (1915-2005) MCC.
- Albert O. Hirschman. ERC.
- Helga Holbek. AFSC.
- Joseph Hyman. JDC.
- Charles R. Joy. USC.
- Herbert Katzki. JDC.
- Gertrude Kershner. AFSC.
- Howard Kershner. AFSC.
- Donald A. Lowrie. YMCA.
- Helen Lowrie. YMCA, USC.
- Marjorie McClelland. AFSC.
- Roswell McClelland. AFSC.
- Lindsley Noble. AFSC.
- Clarence Pickett. AFSC.
- Alice Resch. AFSC.
- Andrée Saloman. OSE.
- Martha Sharp. USC.
- Waitstill Sharp. USC.
- Aristides de Sousa Mendes, Portuguese Consul General in Bordeaux
- Myles Standish was a Vice Consul in the Visa Section of the American Consulate General in Marseilles. Like Hiram Bingham IV he was generous in giving visas to refugees from Nazism. Transferred, as Bingham was, probably for violating State Department visa policy, he resigned from the Foreign Service in 1942.
- Tracy Strong, Jr. YMCA, European Student Relief Fund (ESRF).
- Vladamir Vochoc. Consulate of Czechoslovakia. Vochoc issued hundreds of Czech passports to non-Czech refugees to enable them to leave France.
- Joseph Weill. OSE.
