= Charles R. Joy =

Charles Rhind Joy (1885-1978) was a Unitarian minister, author, and humanitarian in Europe during World War II. He is best known as the director of the Lisbon office of the Unitarian Service Committee (USC), a relief and refugee organization, from 1940 to 1942. The USC assisted people fleeing Nazi Germany or imprisoned by the Nazis in refugee camps in France. Joy's work with refugees, including helping some illegally escape Nazi-occupied Europe, was controversial. He was also in conflict with others in USC about the priorities for assistance to refugees. Returning to the United States, Joy served as Executive Director of the USC from 1944-1946. After the end of WW II, the USC was accused of being infiltrated by communists. Joy, a married man, was accused of a romantic involvement with one of them, Herta "Jo" Tempi. Both Tempi and Joy were colleagues of communist Noel Field. Joy's relationship with Tempi led to his resignation from USC.

== Early life ==
Charles Joy was born in Boston on December 5, 1885, the son of Robert S. Joy and Arabella Sophia Parke. He grew up in Boston and attended Harvard College where he studied English literature and languages, learning to speak both French and German. In 1908 he entered Harvard Divinity School. Joy married Lucy Alice Wanzer (1884-1962) of Cambridge, Massachusetts on June 29, 1911.The couple had three children, Alice Parke, Lucy Parke (twins, born February 23, 1912) and Robert Arthur (born April 13, 1922). Joy was ordained as a Unitarian minister in January 1913. He served as the pastor of a church in Portland, Maine.

When the U.S. entered World War I in 1917, Joy declared himself a pacifist and opposed the war. Church members burned him in effigy and he resigned, getting a job with the YMCA and working in France with French and American soldiers. He was awarded the Medaille Commemorative de la Grand Guerre by the French Government. In 1919, he returned to the U.S. and became the pastor of a church in Pittsfield, Massachusetts. In 1927, he became the pastor of a Unitarian church in Lowell, Massachusetts. In 1937, he was a candidate tor the leader of the American Unitarian Association, but withdrew his candidacy in favor of Frederick May Eliot. In 1940, he became pastor of a church in St. Louis.

Joy is remembered for commissioning the creation in 1941 of the "flaming chalice" which became the symbol of Unitarianism.

== World War II ==
In mid-September 1940, after France had surrendered to Nazi Germany, Joy replaced Waitstill and Martha Sharp as head of the Unitarian Service Committee's office in Lisbon. USC had the dual objective of helping refugees who had escaped occupied Europe and facilitating their emigration elsewhere plus providing humanitarian aid to refugees and prisoners of war in Europe. Still a neutral in the War, Americans could work in southern (unoccupied) France and other occupied countries. On the recommendation of USC's Donald A. Lowrie, Joy hired Noel Field, a former diplomat with the U.S. Department of State, to open a field office in Marseille. Joy was replaced in Lisbon in April 1941 by Robert Dexter, founder of the USC. Joy returned to work in the USC's head office in Boston.

Joy's work in Portugal and France and in the U.S. during the war was controversial. Employees of the USC and other humanitarian organizations working in Europe often helped refugees illegally escape France and journey to Portugal. In the summer of 1941, Joy was worried that the State Department would refuse to renew his passport and stymie his plans to return to Europe. The USC disavowed to the State Department the work of one USC employee in France and said Joy had not been involved in illegal activities. The State Department renewed his passport and in September 1941 he was back in Portugal. The Nazis took notice of him in October 1941 with a news article in an official publication that said of Joy: "Political criminals fare best with him. Those who plot assassinations are his dear children. He shelters them and nurses them and covers them with his spiritual mantle. He hides them in the country in lonely farmhouses...and even finds the money for it, heaven knows where." Joy returned to the U.S. in 1942 and spent the rest of the war in the U.S. He attempted in 1943 to travel to North Africa to work with refugees in that region, but was turned down by the U.S. government which strictly limited the number of American civilians permitted in the region. In 1944, the State Department again turned down Joy for a job in north Africa with the War Refugee Board. Author Subak said that "Charles Joy was the next most notorious American, after Varian Fry, when it came to helping refugees."

Joy was also involved in internal disputes in the USC, especially with Robert Dexter. One of the issues was that Dexter believed that the USC in Europe should focus on helping refugees emigrate. Joy believed the USC resources should be directed to the hundreds of thousands of refugees -- Spanish Republicans, Jews, Romani and others considered enemies by the Nazis—in refugee camps in France. Dexter agreed with a statement by another Unitarian that "A few men and women of ability and prominence saved are more worthwhile than a hundred to whom we simply give a bit of food and whose agony we help to prolong." Joy believed the opposite, "It is better to keep 6,000 children alive in France than take a hundred or so to America." (The Holocaust was not yet envisioned by most people. The first large-scale deportations of Jews from southern France to German death camps did not take place until August 1942.)

The disputes between Joy and Dexter became bitter and were resolved in October 1944. Dexter resigned from the USC and Joy became the Executive Director.

=== OSS and World Refugee Board involvement ===
Many employees of the Unitarian Service Committee worked with or cooperated with the American clandestine Office of Strategic Services (OSS). Joy's involvement with the OSS consisted of passing information and attempting to use his OSS contacts to replace his rival Robert Dexter in Lisbon. The OSS was amused by the disputes between Dexter and Joy.

The War Refugee Board (WRB) was created by the United States in January 1944 to aid civilian victims of Nazi Germany. On February 26, 1944, DirectorJohn Pehle met with Joy and a dozen other refugee experts in New York to establish strategy and objectives of the WRB. Subsequent to the meeting, in 1944 and 1945, the U.S. government funneled large amounts of money for resistance groups and help to refugees from the Nazis through the newly created WRB. Charles Joy in the U.S. and Noel Field in France, who Joy had hired, were channels through which the money was distributed. The USC's chronic budget problems were resolved and money became abundant.

== Postwar ==
The end of World War II in Europe in May 1945 brought plaudits for the work of the Unitarians and Charles Joy. On May 16, 1945, the Hebrew Immigrant and Sheltering Society (HIAS) hosted a luncheon in Boston in Charles Joy's honor. In 1947, U.S.President Truman congratulated the USC for its war and post-war work.

Joy's relationship with Noel Field became a problem with the anti-communism prevalent in the United States in the post-war period. Joy had hired Field for USC and supported him strongly. He also was enthusiastic about Johanna Herta "Jo" Tempi who had been hired by Field and was, like Field, a communist. Tempi became the USC's representative in Paris after the city was recaptured by the Americans and in early 1945 there were complaints that she was favoring the communists in dispensing resources. In August 1946, Tempi came to the United States on a speaking tour. Joy and Tempi spent the night together in a sleeping compartment on a train from Boston to New York and shared a New York hotel room. Joy denied being a communist and sexual wrongdoing, but he was not believed and the USC board demanded his resignation. The Unitarian Service Committee was already under suspicion for its communist associations by the House Committee On Un-American Activities. Conservative Unitarians were attempting to purge leftists from the USC and Joy's indiscretion gave them the ammunition they needed. Tempi returned to her job in Paris, but was also soon forced to resign over the protests of Field, her superviser.

Joy subsequently worked for Save the Children and CARE in Europe, Korea, and the United States. He traveled world-wide on his duties. He retired in 1955 to lecture and write. He wrote more than a dozen books, including several about Albert Schweitzer who he met in Africa in 1947. After the death of his wife in 1962, he lived with his daughter Alice in Albany, New York. He died in Albany on September 26, 1978, age 92.
