= Noel Field =

American communist activist, diplomat, and NKVD spy

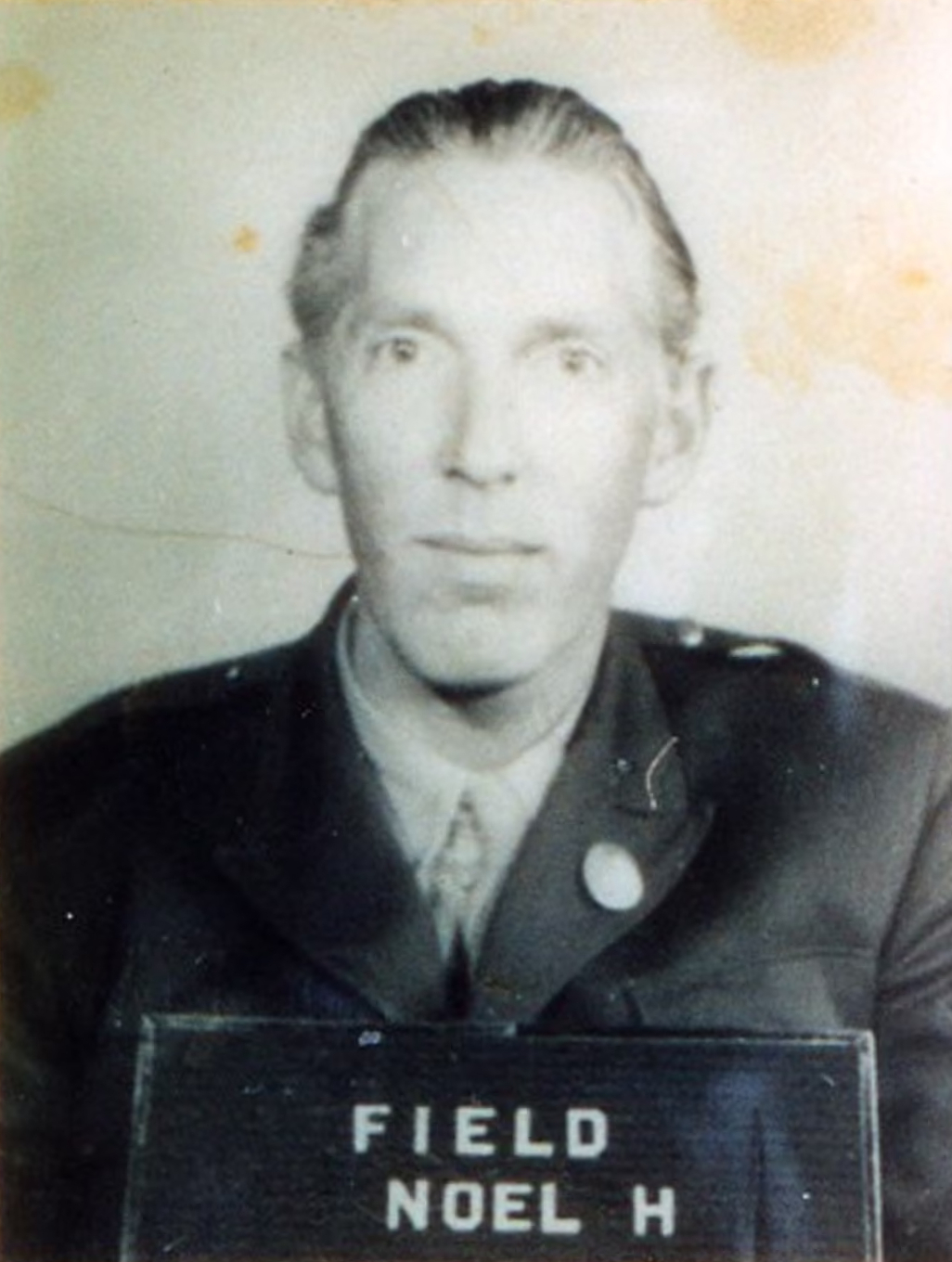
- Field's War Department ID photo, 1946
- Born: Noel Haviland Field; 23 January 1904; Lewisham, London, England
- Died: 12 September 1970 (aged 66); Budapest, People's Republic of Hungary
- Spouse: Herta Katharina Vieser
- Children: Erika Glaser Wallach (adopted)
- Parents: Herbert Haviland Field (father); Nina Eschwege Field (mother)

Noel Haviland Field (23 January 1904 – 12 September 1970) was an American diplomat who was accused of being a spy for the NKVD. His name was used as a prosecuting rationale during the 1949 Rajk show trial in Hungary, as well as the 1952 Slánský show trial in Czechoslovakia. Much controversy surrounds the Field story. In 2015, the historian David Talbot reignited claims that Field was set up by Allen Dulles in order to create paranoia designed to undermine the Soviet Union.

During World War II, Field worked in France and Switzerland to support Jewish and anti-fascist refugees. During this time, he also had contact with the U.S. intelligence service OSS. Arrested in Prague in 1949 by the Czechoslovak secret police, handed over to the Hungarian secret police and subsequently imprisoned in Hungary, he served as the pretext for show trials of Communist functionaries in Czechoslovakia, East Germany and Hungary, where it was claimed that he had served as their American spymaster. Among the primary purposes of the show trials was to replace many indigenous communist party members with others more tightly associated with Moscow. After his release in 1954, he stayed in Budapest.

== Early life ==
Field was born in south London in 1904, the first son of Brooklyn-born zoologist Herbert Haviland Field, who directed an international scientific bibliographical institute in Zürich, and his English wife. After Herbert Field's death in 1921, his wife took Noel Field, his brother Hermann, and two sisters to the U.S., where the boys attended Harvard University. Upon completion of his studies, Noel married his childhood sweetheart from Switzerland, Herta Katharina Vieser.

== Career ==
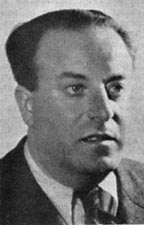
Ignatz Reiss, Field's ultimate superior in the GRU during the 1930s

Noel Field began his career at the State Department in the late 1920s. In the 1930s, he was an antifascist and sympathised with Soviet peace initiatives, as did many Western progressives at the time. In 1933 (1934 per Hede Massing's later testimony), Field met the German anti-Nazis Paul and Hede Massing, who had come to the U.S. from Moscow to build a network of Soviet agents among influential left-wing circles. Marguerite Young recommended Field to Massing.

Peter Gutzeit, the Soviet Consul in New York City, was also an officer in the Soviet NKVD which was tasked with espionage. In 1934 he identified Noel Field and his friend, Laurence Duggan, as future Soviet spies. Gutzeit wrote on 3 October 1934, that Duggan "is interesting to us because through him one will be able to find a way toward Noel Field... of the State Department's European Department with whom Duggan is friendly." Iskhak Akhmerov decided that Boris Bazarov should be the one to work with Hede Massing on this project.

In 1935, Hede Massing, who was an NKVD operative, tried to sign Field up for the NKVD. Field agreed to work for the NKVD. However, in 1936, Field accepted a post in Geneva with the League of Nations. Massing arranged for Field to make contact with Ignatz Reiss and Walter Krivitsky, who was in charge of Soviet intelligence in Switzerland. Based on this account, recent biographer Tony Sharp has determined that Field engaged in espionage for about a year in 1935.

Field was deeply moved by the Spanish Civil War and became involved in efforts to aid victims and opponents of fascism. As a League of Nations representative in Spain from 1938 to 1939, Field helped to repatriate foreign participants from the Republican side. During the Civil War, Noel Field and his wife Herta became friendly with a German medical doctor named Glaser who worked in a hospital attached to the International Brigade. When the Brigade retreated during the final collapse of the Loyalist forces, Glaser's daughter, Erica, became ill and was separated from her parents. The Fields found her in a receiving camp on the French-Spanish border and brought her with them to Switzerland, where they treated her as their own child. They intended to reunite her with her parents who had fled to England, but the outbreak of World War II in September 1939 made that difficult, and Erica became a permanent member of the Field home, in effect their foster child.

== World War II ==
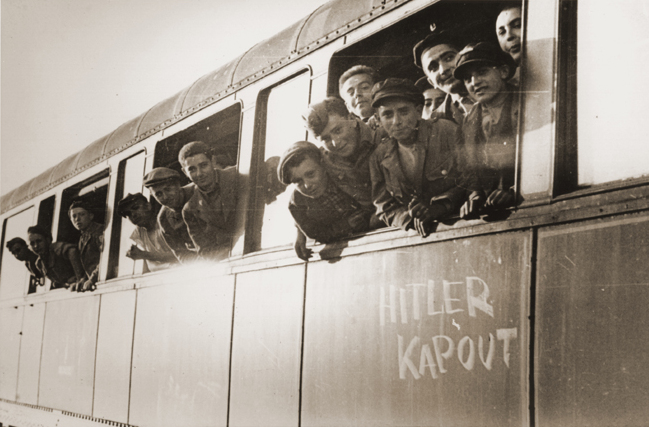
Jewish youth liberated at Buchenwald lean out a train marked Hitler kaput ("Hitler [is] finished") en route to an OSE home in Ecouis, France.

In October 1940, Field resigned his post in Geneva and in 1941, hired by Charles R. Joy, became director of the American Unitarian Universalist Service Committee's relief mission in Marseille, providing relief for endangered Jewish refugees including antifascists and leftists, and helping many to flee to Switzerland. Field began a major collaboration with the Organization to Save the Children (OSE), a French Jewish humanitarian organization, and its Marseille director, Joseph Weill. The two organizations later shared the same offices in Marseille and Noel Field, with help from his wife, set up kindergartens in the Camp de Rivesaltes. The Fields worked with a number of French Jewish women and collaborated with OSE to liberate Jewish children from French internment camps both openly if possible and covertly if the camp director would not cooperate. Also beginning in early 1941, Noel Field established an extensive medical program to provide aid to Jewish refugees in hiding, those waiting to emigrate, or those held in internment camps. Drawing on the medical expertise of some of the Jewish refugees, Field developed a team of about 20 medical doctors, dentists, and nurses, some with international reputations. From his contacts in Switzerland, he acquired medicines and nutritional supplements that were extraordinarily hard to obtain. With the American Friends Service Committee, and his lead doctor, Rene Zimmer, Field implemented a nutritional survey of many thousands of the refugees interned in French camps and provided additional food for those in greatest need.

During this period, Field worked with the Nîmes Committee, a network of about 30 relief organizations in Vichy France, and maintained congenial ties with Charles R. Joy, Varian Fry and other relief workers who viewed him as a dedicated humanitarian who seemed to be working himself into exhaustion and nervous collapse. Field developed a roster of several hundred refugees whom he attempted to help emigrate. Unlike some members of the Unitarian Service Committee and Fry, Field did not face hostility from the staff at the U.S. Embassy in Marseille for his activities, possibly because he sent many of his refugee clients to Switzerland, rather than to the U.S. In 1942, Robert Dexter, director of the Unitarian Service Committee, recruited Field to pass information to the U.S. intelligence service Office of Strategic Services (OSS). When the Germans occupied the rest of France in November 1942, the Fields escaped from Marseille and re-established a refugee program in Geneva. In 1944, Field returned to southern France, traveling with the French guerrilla, the Maquis, and with the approval of Allen Dulles before the area was fully liberated. He arranged for a colleague, Herta Tempi, to establish a small office in Paris as a relief project for the Unitarian Service Committee.

In his relief activities, Field came into contact with a number of communist and antifascist refugees and exiles from Germany and elsewhere and used his position to relay information to various groups. During the war years, Field, based in Switzerland, continued to work on behalf of refugees, including antifascists and communists who, after the war, would assume positions of power in Eastern Europe. Field served Allen Dulles, then head of the OSS and later of the Central Intelligence Agency (CIA), as liaison to Communist resistance fighters when they were needed for OSS operations. Dulles had first met Field in Zürich in 1918 at the home of Field's father. The two had often seen each other in Washington D.C. when both worked at the State Department. Dulles hoped Field could use his Communist connections in Switzerland and Germany to shed light on Stalin's postwar objectives in Europe.

== Post-war arrests ==
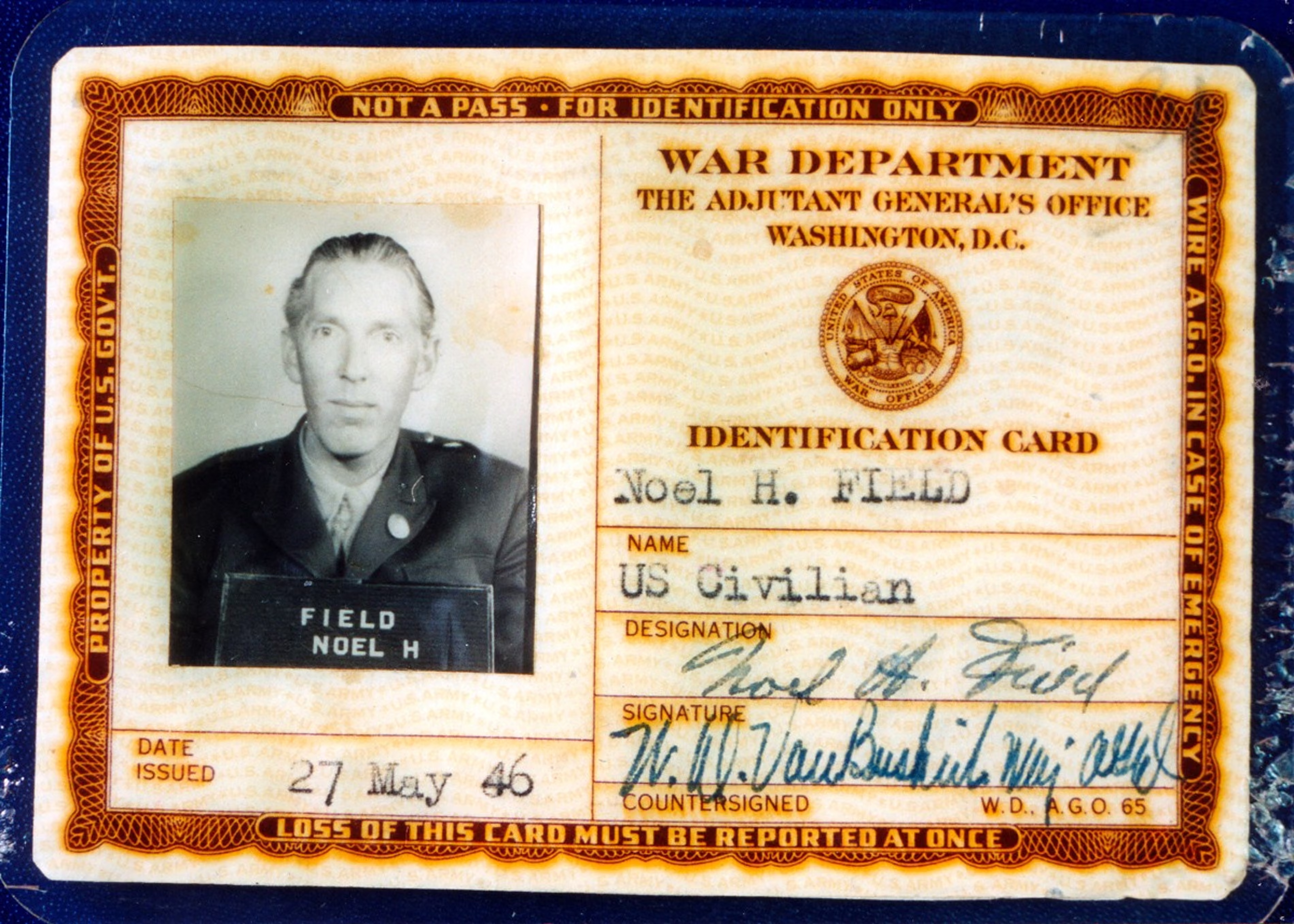
Field's War Department ID card, 1946

On 3 August 1948, Whittaker Chambers appeared under subpoena before HUAC. Among the former Federal officials in Washington, DC, whom he named as Soviet spies was Alger Hiss. Hiss warned Field in letters that he should not return to the United States. Two months later, as this affair distilled down to the Hiss(-Chambers) Case, Chambers named Field, whose name appeared in newspapers on 15 October 1948. Field's double-life ended effectively that day.

Between March and May 1949, Field moved from Switzerland to Prague, in Communist Czechoslovakia and Franz Dahlem helped him obtain asylum.

=== Arrest of Noel Field ===
On 11 May 1949, Field walked out of his hotel accompanied by two unidentified men. He left his papers, luggage, and traveller's cheques in his room as if he expected to return.

=== Arrest of Herta Field ===
Field's wife Herta became increasingly worried about the lack of word from Field. She believed her husband had been kidnapped by the CIA in connection with the Massing and Hiss cases. In the hope of getting information from Czechoslovak authorities, she traveled to Prague and met with members of the StB, the country's secret police. She described her husband's involvement with Soviet intelligence to them. Her account matched Field's confession to the Hungarian secret police (ÁVH), which had been made available to the Czechoslovaks. On 28 August 1949, in Bratislava, she was handed over to the Hungarians, who arrested her and took her to Budapest.

=== Arrest of Hermann Field ===
Meanwhile, Field's brother Hermann wrote to two Polish friends, Mela Granowska and Helena Syrkus, and asked for help getting a visa to visit Warsaw. The two women passed the letter on to the Polish secret police, the Bezpieka, whence they were ordered to ensure that Hermann traveled to Warsaw, where he was arrested while on his way to the airport to leave the country. Like his brother, Noel, Hermann had for a time worked to help endangered refugees and had shown a preference for communists and antifascists. In 1939, Hermann had served in the Kraków office of the Czechoslovak Refugee Trust Fund to help persecuted refugees, who were preponderantly Jewish, to emigrate to Great Britain.

=== Arrest of Erica Wallach ===
After the war, the Fields' adopted daughter Erica moved to the American Zone of occupied Germany and got a job with the American Office of Strategic Services. She left to join the postwar German Communist Party and worked as secretary to the communist representatives in the Hesse state legislature. She met and fell in love with U.S. Army Captain Robert Wallach. When her party superiors objected to the relationship, Erica broke her connections with the party and the couple moved to Paris. In 1947, she was refused admission to the U.S. because of her communist past. In June 1950, Erica decided to search for the Fields, her foster parents. From Paris, she called on Leo Bauer, an old friend from the Swiss exile group, then editor-in-chief of East German radio. The call was monitored by the Soviet Ministry for Internal Affairs, and Bauer's Soviet superior ordered him to invite Erica to East Berlin, where she was arrested. Erich Mielke at one point offered her immediate release if she revealed the members of her spy network. She was condemned to death by a Soviet military court in Berlin and shipped to Moscow's Lubianka prison for execution. After Joseph Stalin's death in 1953, her sentence was reduced to hard labor in Vorkuta Labor Camp, north of the Arctic Circle. She was released in October 1955 by Khrushchev.

=== Show trials ===
Noel Field had in fact been arrested – reportedly on the personal order of Lavrenti Beria – and had been handed over to the Hungarian authorities, who began to prepare the trial of László Rajk, the first of the postwar Eastern European show trials. The trial was held in September 1949, its premise being that Field and his agents had worked to undermine the development of indigenous resistance, especially in Germany, to strengthen the Western influence and create a divided postwar Germany. "Noel Field," stated the prosecutor was "one of the leaders of American espionage," who "specialized in recruiting spies from among left-wing elements." Field was tortured and held in solitary confinement for five years, often at the edge of death. A matter of interest to students of the Cold War came to light years later when records from Field's interrogations were found in the Hungarian Interior Ministry archives. In those records Field named U.S. government official Alger Hiss as a fellow Communist spy:

Interrogator: What was the essential point of the Alger Hiss case?
Field: In the Fall of 1935, Hiss requested that I undertake intelligence work for the Soviet Union... I informed him that I was already conducting such work.
Interrogator: So you revealed to Alger Hiss that you did intelligence work for the Soviet Union?
Field: Yes.

In East Germany, in August 1950, six Communist functionaries, including Willi Kreikemeyer, the director of East zone railroads, and the boss of Radio Berlin, were accused of "special connections with Noel Field, the American spy." All were either imprisoned or executed.

In Czechoslovakia, in November 1952, Rudolf Slánský, the Secretary General of the Communist Party, and 13 highly placed co-defendants confessed to high treason, conspiracy, murder, espionage, Titoism, and Zionism on behalf of "foreign imperialist agents." "The well-known agent Field" was named as their spymaster.

=== Release of the Fields ===
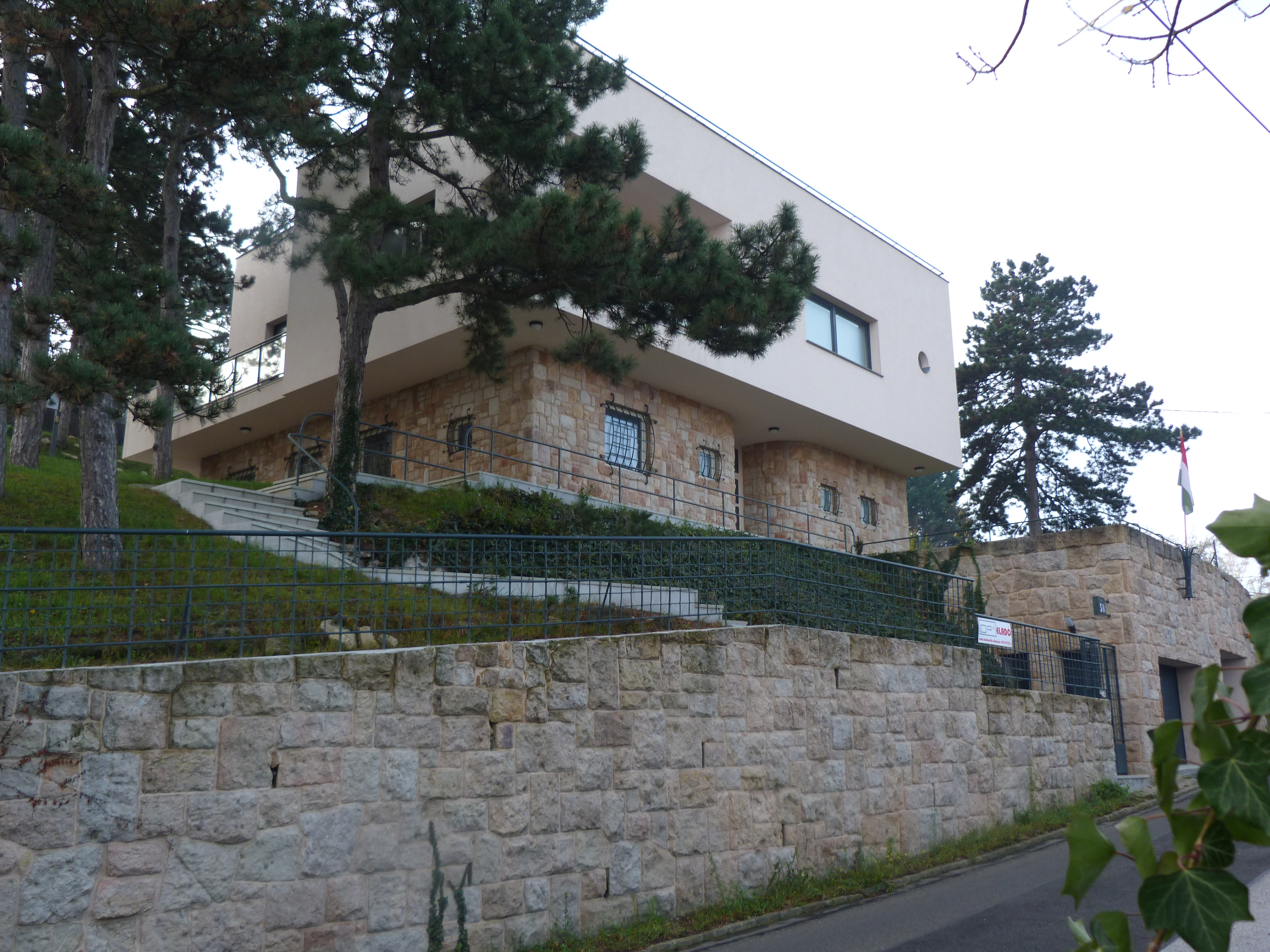
Noel Field's former home in Sashegy, Budapest (Vécsey mansion)

No trial of the Fields themselves was ever held. Noel, Herta, and Hermann Field were released in October 1954. Hermann returned to America, later publishing an account of the case, "Trapped in the Cold War: The Ordeal of an American Family". Noel and Herta Field, however, opted to settle in Budapest, where, despite the torture inflicted on them, they did not condemn the Communist regime, leading some to dub them apologists.

In Field's own words, written while he was imprisoned:

My accusers essentially have the same convictions that I do, they hate the same things and the same people I hate – the conscious enemies of socialism, the fascists, the renegades, the traitors. Given their belief in my guilt, I cannot blame them. I cannot but approve their detestation. That is the real horror of it all.

— Mainstream magazine, Jan. 1961

Historian Arthur Schlesinger, Jr., who had blocked Field's bid for OSS funds for a German communist front group during World War II, later commented, "Field's simple-mindedness was indestructible".

In October 1955, Erica Glaser Wallach was released from Vorkuta Labor Camp, under an amnesty declared by Nikita Khrushchev that year but was unable to join her husband and daughters in the U.S. because of the State Department's concern over her earlier Communist Party membership. It took the personal intervention of Allen Dulles to reunite her with her family in 1957. Her account of her experiences, "Light at Midnight", was published in 1967.

== Hypotheses regarding Field's role in the show trials ==
Field was ideally suited to the Communists' show trials; he had known and assisted many highly placed officials, including resistance fighters and members of the Spanish International Brigades with whom he had maintained contact after the war. In addition, he had contact with Allen Dulles which allowed the Communists to construct a scenario of cooperation with the U.S. directed against the Soviet bloc. It could even be argued that Field had turned his friends into a spy network penetrating Central Europe. Moscow could thus counteract the ongoing uncovering of its own network in the U.S. with the bogus uncovering of an extensive network of American spies headed by the same Field whom the U.S. had charged with being a Soviet agent.

The journalist Drew Pearson maintained that the Soviets, encountering resistance to demands for grain and for military support from local Communist leaders in the ‘Eastern Bloc’, in particular who had spent the war outside the USSR, used the myth of a Field-led spy network to purge them all. Pearson speculated that Field was arrested and incarcerated to prevent him from discrediting the trumped-up charges of disloyalty.

It has been suggested that Allen Dulles, informed that Noel Field was on his way to Prague, saw an irresistible opportunity to create havoc among his Cold War adversaries and lit the fuse by instructing Józef Światło, (whom they allege his Polish agent within Eastern Bloc counterintelligence devices, though reality he only came in contact with Western intelligence after his defection in 1953), to alert his colleagues to the impending arrival of Dulles's master spy, coming now to activate the network of traitors he had put in place during the war years.

However, if any involvement was in place, it is thought far more likely that CIA officials saw a chance to sow discord once the Fields had been arrested and fanned the blaze of paranoia and Stalinist terror. It is undisputed that Allen Dulles was delighted by the chaos caused by the Field case and did not express any sympathy for the plight of the Fields or the harsh treatment they received. He even refused all efforts by Field's sister Elsie to help rescue Noel and Herta.

== Later life ==
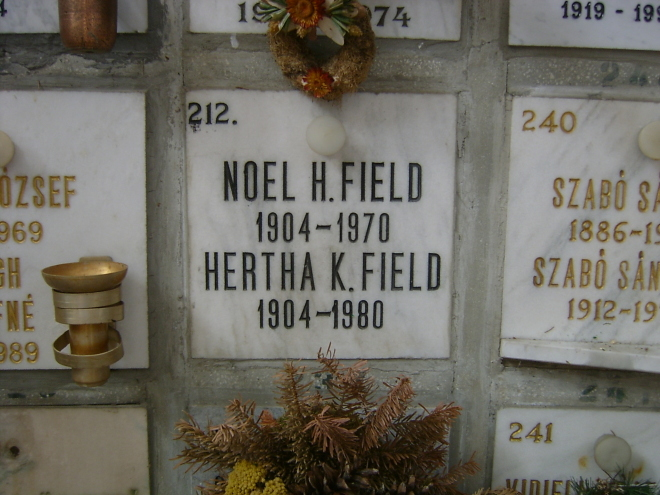
Noel Field's tomb in the Farkasréti Cemetery, Budapest

Noel Field remained a staunch communist; his final testament, written in Budapest and published in an American political journal, was entitled "Hitching Our Wagon to a Star."

Noel Field died in 1970, and his wife Herta in 1980.

His story became the subject of a 1997 documentary by the Swiss film producer Werner Schweizer, Noel Field - Der erfundene Spion (Noel Field, the Fictitious Spy).

== Works ==
By Noel Field:

- Field, Noel (January 1961). "Hitching Our Wagon to a Star". Mainstream. ISSN 0738-5447.

By Hermann Field:

- Field, Hermann; Field, Kate (1999). Trapped in the Cold War: The Ordeal of an American Family. Stanford: Stanford University Press. ISBN 9780804735902.

== See also ==
- List of American spies
- Charles R. Joy
- Hede Massing
- Marguerite Young (journalist)
- John Abt
- Whittaker Chambers
- Harold Glasser
- John Herrmann
- Alger Hiss
- Donald Hiss
- Victor Perlo
- J. Peters
- Ward Pigman
- Lee Pressman
- Vincent Reno
- Julian Wadleigh
- Harold Ware
- Nathaniel Weyl
- Harry Dexter White
- Nathan Witt

== External sources ==
Biographies:

- Grimm, Thomas; Schweizer, Werner; Barth, Bernd-Rainer (2005). "Der Fall Noel Field: Schlüsselfigur der Schauprozesse in Osteuropa". Basisdruck. Archived from the original on 10 August 2017.
- Lewis, Flora (1965). Red Pawn: The Story of Noel Field. Doubleday & Company.
- Marton, Kati (2016). True Believer : Stalin's Last American Spy. Simon & Schuster.
- Schweizer, Werner (1996). Noel Field: The Fictitious Spy (Documentary film). Dschoint Ventschr Filmproduktion.
- Sharp, Tony (2014). Stalin's American Spy: Noel Field, Allen Dulles and the East European Show-Trials. London: Hurst. p. 410.

Other:

- Burke, Colin B. (2014). Information and Intrigue: From Index Cards to Dewey Cards to Alger Hiss. MIT Press (For Field family history to 1945).
- Chambers, Whittaker (1952). Witness. New York: Random House. pp. 799 (total). LCCN 52005149.
- Haynes, John Earl; Klehr, Harvey (1999). Venona: Decoding Soviet Espionage in America. Yale University Press.
- Klingsberg, Ethan (8 November 1993). "Case Closed on Alger Hiss?". The Nation. Archived from the original on 9 September 2006.
- Schmidt, Maria (December 2004) "Noel Field—The American Communist at the Center of Stalin's East European Purge: From the Hungarian Archives," American Communist History, Vol. 3, No. 2, pp. 215-245, American Communist History . Retrieved 1 December 2019.
- Schmidt, Mária (2005). A Titkoszolgálatok Kulisszái Mögött - Hitek, Ideológiák És Hírszerzok a XX (Battle of Wits - Beliefs, Ideologies and Secret Agents in the 20th Century). Budapest: Század Intézet.
- Steven, Stewart (1974). Operation Splinter Factor. Philadelphia: Lippincott.
- Subak, Susan (2010). Rescue and Flight: American Relief Workers Who Defied the Nazis. University of Nebraska Press.
