= Artemis Joukowsky III =

Film director and disabilities activist

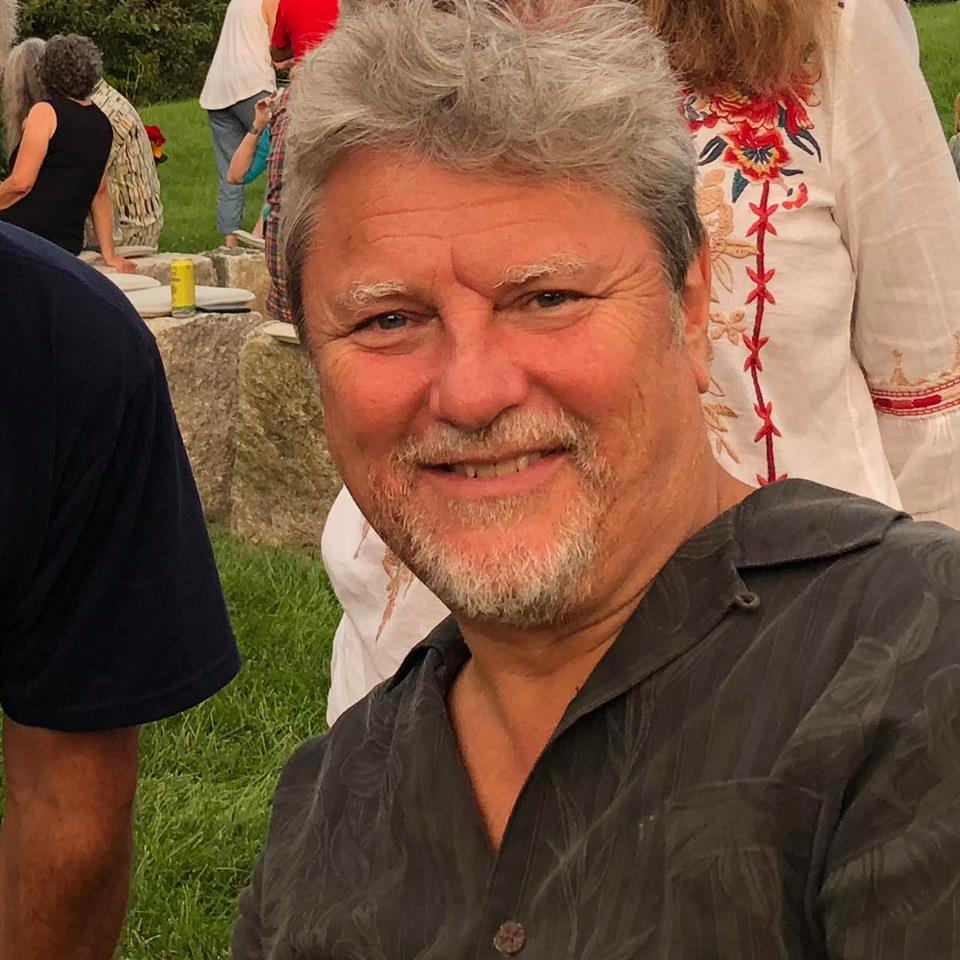
- Born: 10 May
- Occupations: Director, author, and producer

Artemis Joukowsky III is an American director, author, producer and disabilities activist. He is best known for his work on the documentary films Defying the Nazis: The Sharps' War, Carbon Nation and more.

== Life and career ==
Artemis Joukowsky III was born to Artemis A.W. Joukowsky and Martha Sharp Joukowsky. His father was chancellor of Brown University, and mother a Near Eastern archaeologist; together they established the Joukowsky Institute for Archaeology and the Ancient World. He is the grandson of Waitstill Sharp and Martha Sharp, who helped save hundreds of Jews and other refugees endangered in Nazi Germany and in countries under its control. To honour his grandparents he co-directed a documentary film Defying the Nazis: The Sharps' War in 2016 along with director Ken Burns. He was a vice-chairman of Econergy International, and co-founded the Highland Energy Group.

Joukowsky was diagnosed with spinal muscular atrophy type III at age 14. He is the co-founder with Larry Rothstein of No Limits Media (NLM). He holds a BA in social ecology from Hampshire College and an MA in psychology from Goddard College. He was a member of the United States Paralympics team and his other works were "Raising the Bar: New Horizons in Disability Sports" a book which he co-wrote with Larry Rothstein, a photographic exhibition was set in collaboration with the United Nations.

== Filmography ==
Year	Film	Writer	Director	Producer	Notes
2022	Light and Shadows	✗	✗	✓	Documentary Film
2020	The Genetics of Hope	✓	✓	✓	Documentary Film
2017	Re-Evolution: The Cuban Dream	✗	✗	✓	Documentary Film
2017	Portrait of Harry	✗	✗	✓	Documentary Film
2017	Cries from Syria	✗	✗	✓	Documentary Film
2016	Defying the Nazis: The Sharps' War	✓	✓	✓	Documentary Film
2014	Cowboys and Engines	✗	✗	✓	Short Film
2010	Carbon Nation	✗	✗	✓	Documentary Film
2008	Alex's POV	✗	✗	✓	Documentary Film
2008	The Raven	✗	✗	✓	Short Film

== Publications ==
- Raising The Bar: New Horizons In Disability Sports
- Defying the Nazis: The Sharps' War
- The Gift: Stories of Triumph in the Face of Life's Greatest Adversities
