= Dallas Lore Sharp =

American author (1870–1929)

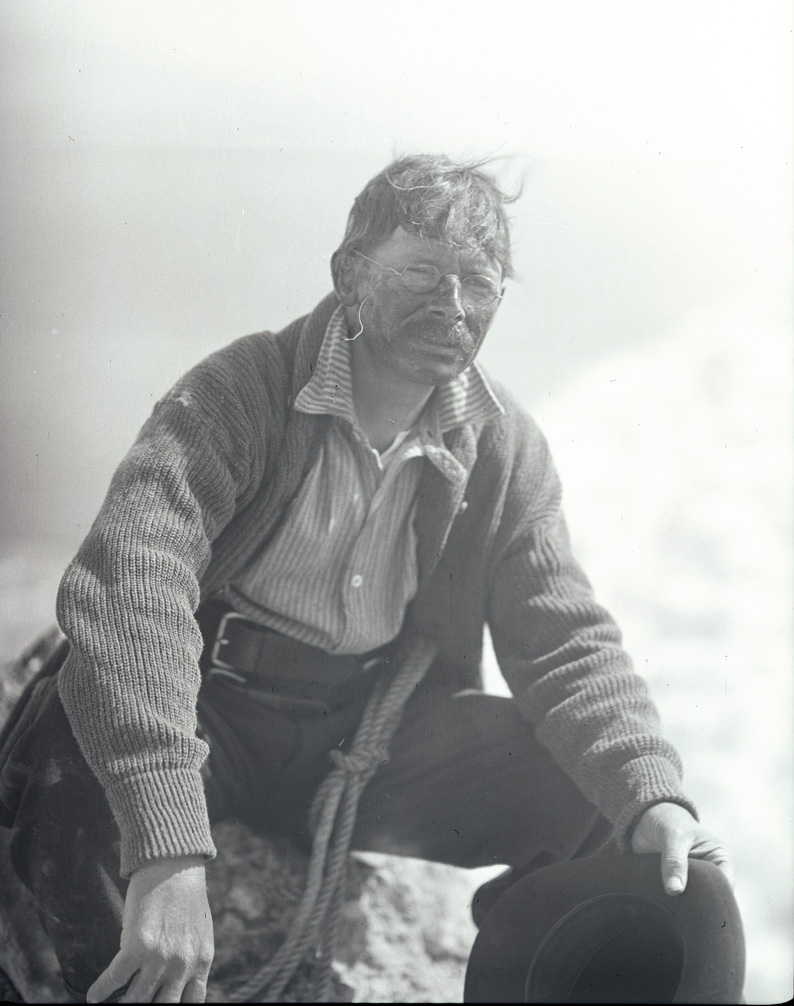
- Dallas Lore Sharp resting on a rock near the summit of Mount Hood, 1912.jpg
- Born: 1870; Haleyville, New Jersey
- Died: 1929 (aged 58–59)
- Education: Brown University (B.A., 1895); Boston University School of Theology (S.T.B., 1899)
- Occupations: professor and author
- Spouse: Grace Hastings
- Children: Waitstill Sharp, Dallas Lore Sharp II, Morrison Sharp, Huntington Sharp

Dallas Lore Sharp (1870–1929) was an American author and university professor, born in the Haleyville section of Commercial Township, in Cumberland County, New Jersey.

He graduated at Brown University in 1895, served as a Methodist Episcopal minister for four years, and graduated at the Boston University School of Theology in 1899. He married Grace Hastings and the couple had four sons, including Waitstill Sharp.

He was assistant librarian (1899–1902), assistant professor of English (1902–09), and thereafter professor at Boston University.

As a writer he became known through his charming magazine articles on native birds and small mammals and for his books which featured illustrations by American wildlife illustrator Robert Bruce Horsfall as well as artist Elizabeth Myers Snagg.

== Works ==
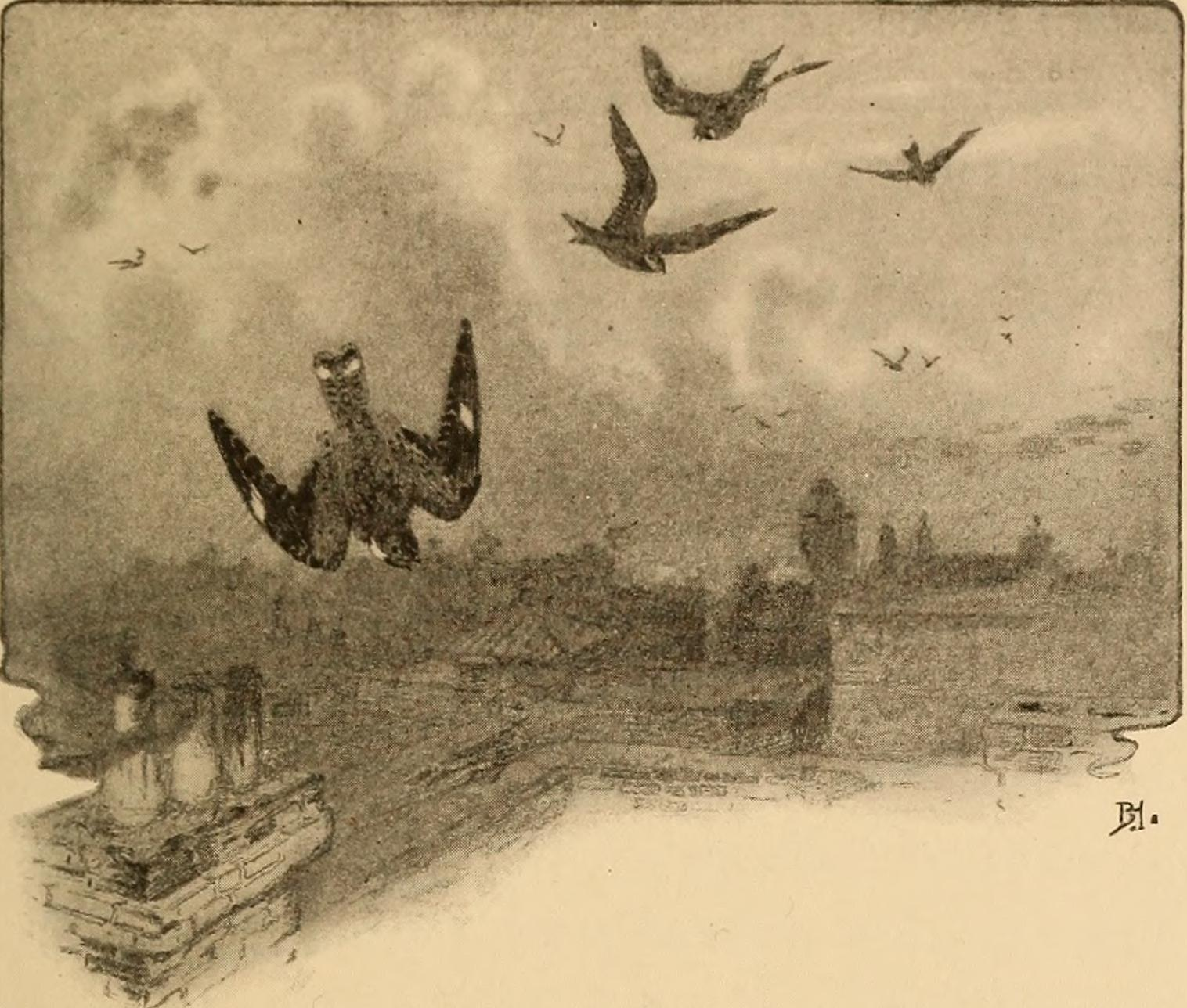
Roof and meadow (1904) illustration

- Wildlife Near Home (1901)
- A Watcher in the Woods (1903)
- Roof and Meadow (1904)
- The Lay of the Land (1908) illustrated by Elizabeth Myers Snagg
- Ways of the Woods (1908)
- A Cure for Winter (1908)
- In American Fields and Forests (1908) (with Henry David Thoreau, John Burroughs, Bradford Torrey, Dallas Lore Sharp, Olive Thorne Miller, and John Muir)
- The Spring of the Year (1909)
- The Fall of the Year (1911)
- The Face of the Fields (1911)
- Winter (1912)
- Summer (1913)
- The Year Out of Doors (1914)
- Beyond the Pasture Bars (1914)
- Where Rolls the Oregon (1914) (revised and reprinted as Eastern Naturalist in the West: Dallas Lore Sharp 1912 by Sand Lake Press)
- The Whole Year Round (1915)
- The Hills of Hingham (1916)
- Patrons of Democracy (1920)
- The Seer of Slabsides (1921)
- A January Summer (1922)
- Highlands and Hollows (1923)
- The Magical Chance (1923)
- The Spirit of the Hive (1925)
- Sanctuary! Sanctuary! (1926)
- The Better Country (1928)
- Romances frrm the Old Testament (1932)
- Christ and His Time (1933)
