= Susan Subak =

American environmental scientist

- Born: United States
- Education: Reed College; Massachusetts Institute of Technology; University of East Anglia
- Known for: Creation of the first comprehensive international carbon inventory
- Awards: Nautilus Book Award
- Scientific career
- Fields: Environmental Science, Climate Science
- Workplaces: University of East Anglia, United States Environmental Protection Agency, Stockholm Environmental Institute, European Commission, Swiss’ Federal Office of the Environment, Swedish Environmental Protection Agency, Netherlands Environmental Assessment Agency
- Thesis: Methane policy perspectives : towards improved emissions estimation, projection and control (1995)

Susan Elisabeth Subak is an environmental scientist and author. She has worked for environmental agencies around the world and is known for her work on America's carbon footprint and climate change.

== Early life and education ==
=== Early life ===
Susan Subak grew up in Oak Park, Illinois. She attended the Lowell School, the Beye School, and Oak Park and River Forest High School (OPRF). While attending OPRF, Subak and a friend started an environmental group — the Student Ecology Corp. The Student Ecology Corp aided the Oak Park Conservatory in collecting seeds that were later used to restore the prairie threatened by the expansion to the local mall.

=== Education ===
Subak earned a B.A. at Reed College and later received a master's degree in Urban Planning from MIT. In 1995, Subak received her Ph.D. in Environmental Sciences from the School of Environmental Sciences at the University of East Anglia.

In Subak's master's thesis, Assessing Accountability for Carbon Dioxide in the Atmosphere, she calculates the net anthropogenic carbon release for 130 countries. This analysis provides the first data collection which accounts for carbon released by burning fossil fuels and clearing land. Subak's Ph.D. thesis/dissertation, Methane policy perspectives: towards improved emissions estimation, projection and control, combined the natural and social sciences to construct a more complete methane emissions model.

== Research and career ==
=== Research ===
Subak has 20 years of experience in the field of environmental science. She has had her research published in many peer-reviewed scientific and academic journals.

A 2019 study by Subak for the Stockholm Environmental Institute is the first inventory of greenhouse gas sinks and sources by country. The study was published in Climatic Change. The study, National Greenhouse Gas Accounts: Current Anthropogenic Sources and Sinks, catalogs the major sources of anthropogenic greenhouse gas emissions for 142 countries by drawing on previous research from international databases. This inventory allows countries to create climate policies tailored to their specific needs and provides a reference against which countries can judge the effectiveness of their greenhouse gas emission policies.

=== Career ===
In the early 2000s, Subak worked at the Climatic Research Unit at the University of East Anglia where she conducted and published research on the impact of weather on Lyme disease. At the National Center for Atmospheric Research Subak worked with scientists and water utility specialists to guide the response of water utilities to climate change. In the early 1990s Subak worked as a Senior Analyst at the Stockholm Environment Institute's Boston Center, where she created and updated a country-level greenhouse gas inventory. While working for the United States Environmental Protection Agency in the 1990s Subak published a study comparing the environmental and economic impacts of various beef production practices. Subak has also done research for, and in affiliation with, the European Commission, the United Kingdom's Environmental Agency, the Swiss’ Federal Office of the Environment, the Swedish Environmental Protection Agency, and the Netherlands Environmental Assessment Agency.

== Books ==
In recent years, Subak has published two books.

The first, Rescue and Flight: American Relief Workers Who Defied the Nazis, published in 2010, tells the story of the Unitarian Service Committee, an offshoot of the Unitarian Universalists, committed to helping European refugees during World War II. Subak was inspired to write her book when she learned that the Unitarian Service Committee helped her Jewish father find refuge in the United States during the Holocaust.

The second, The Five-Ton Life: Carbon, America, and the Culture that May Save Us, is an analysis of carbon culture in America. America emits nearly twenty tons of carbon per person, on average. However, some areas emit much less and some much more. By studying pockets of low carbon emissions, Subak brings to light the relationship between social and built environments and carbon footprint.

== Awards and honors ==
In 2018, Subak won the Nautilus Book Award for her book, The Five-Ton Life: Carbon, America, and the Culture that May Save Us. The Five-Ton Life won Silver in the Green Living and Sustainability Category.

The Nautilus Book Award is awarded annually to books in a variety of categories that “contribute to the body of knowledge and understanding for a better world.” Other notable recipients of the Nautilus book award include the Dalai Lama, Desmond Tutu, and Amy Goodman.

- Nautilus Book Award, 2018
- Junior Fellowship, Carnegie Endowment for International Peace, 1983
