= Willi Kreikemeyer =

Willi Kreikemeyer (1894 – c. 1950) was a German labourer and a Communist. From 1941 he and his wife Marthe Kreikemeyer were close assistants of Noel Field who supported German anti-Nazi refugees in France and Switzerland. He died in East German detention as a victim of the Noel Field show trials, which had the function to replace Communist Party officials with others more aligned with Moscow.

== Life ==
Kreikemeyer was a skilled lathe worker. He joined the union in 1910 and 1919 the newly formed Communist Party. Through his work for the Communist Party functionary, he came into close contact with Willi Münzenberg.

Kreikemeyer was severely wounded in the Spanish Civil War and then later used as the first Chief Executive of the German department, as Chefadjudant for all senior divisions of the International Brigades. In these activities he had contact with Erich Mielke, who was then under the code name Leistner or Leissner chief of the instruction department and adjutant of the central administration. Among other things, it is known that both efforts Kreikemeyer Mielke knew to settle in the safe in Mexico, as well as to help that Mielke from the Fund Noel Field erhielt.

== Post-war period ==
After the Second World War they settled in East Berlin. In 1949 he became Director General of the East German railway company Deutsche Reichsbahn.

When in 1950 the slandering campaign started against Noel Field – he was accused of having built an anti-Communist spy network while pretending to be a Communist sympathizer – he was arrested and never seen again. At least one propaganda article against the alleged spy was published in an East German newspaper and a show trial against him was prepared, but never took place. Mrs Kreikemeyer wrote dozens of letters to the GDR authorities inquiring about her husband's fate. For seven years the authorities pretended that he was alive and well, waiting for his trial. Fearing her own arrest, Mrs Kreikemeyer escaped to her home country France in 1954. She continued writing her letters. In 1957 she was told that Willi Kreikemeyer had died a few days after his imprisonment.

Erich Mielke (later the East German Minister of State Security) had been responsible for the detainee. In a confidential document he claimed that he had committed suicide in his prison cell on 31 August 1950. This story has been proven to be a lie. But what really happened to Kreikemeyer can hardly be reconstructed.

Today it is known that Kreikemeyer named Mielke as one of the persons supported by Noel Field. That information threatened Mielke's career: according to a Soviet order, people, who had spent the war in the West had to resign from public office. (In his official CV, Mielke claimed that he had fought in the Red Army during World War II). What's more, alleged collaboration with an "American spy" could have led to the death penalty.

It is therefore likely that Willi Kreikemeyer was murdered on behalf of Erich Mielke.

== Rehabilitation ==
The newly established, emerged from the SED to PDS - Today "The Left", decided at a meeting on 20–21 January 1990, among other things, people who the bloody terror of Stalin in the Soviet Union have fallen victim to rehabilitate. The Arbitration Commission of the PDS has rehabilitated 48 people politically, who suffered under Stalinist persecution and imprisonment, or been murdered. "In the interest of the renewal of the party and on the basis of the then applicable statute lift all sanctions in the past expressed party." Furthermore, subjects who received the late 40s and early 50s of the 20th Century excluded because of their past affiliation with the SPD under the stigma of "social democracy" as a so-called Schumacher agents from the SED and arrested, or in connection with the fictional spy, Noel Field, and the Stalinist show trials in Hungary against László Rajk and others in Bulgaria Traicho Kostov and against others and against Rudolf Slansky in Czechoslovakia, and others were also persecuted by the SED as alleged agents of imperialism or imprisoned. These include, among others rehabilitated a total of 28: Leo Bauer, Alfred Drögemüller, Max Emendörfer, and Stanislaw Trabalski

== Bibliography ==
- (in German) Wolfgang Kießling Leistner ist Mielke. Schatten einer gefälschten Biographie (Leistner is Mielke. Shadow of a faked biography) Aufbau Taschenbuch Verlag, Berlin 1998, ISBN 3-7466-8036-0
- (in German) Wilfriede Otto „Das Verschwinden des Willi Kreikemeyer“ (The disappearance of Willi Kreikemeyer) 1999
