= Defying the Nazis: The Sharps' War =

- Genre: Documentary film
- Written by: Artemis Joukowsky, David Blitstein, Jacoba Atlas
- Directed by: Ken Burns, Artemis Joukowsky
- Starring: Tom Hanks
- Country of origin: United States
- Original language: English

Production
- Producer: Ken Burns
- Editor: Erik Angra
- Running time: 1 hour, 18 minutes

Original release
- Network: PBS
- Release: September 9, 2016

Defying the Nazis: Sharps' War is a 2016 documentary film directed by Ken Burns and Artemis Joukowsky. The film is about the previously untold story of Waitstill and Martha Sharp, an American minister and his wife from Wellesley, Massachusetts, who left their children behind in the care of their parish and boldly committed to a life-threatening mission in Europe. Over two dangerous years they helped to save scores of imperiled Jews and refugees fleeing Nazi occupation across Europe.

== Production ==
Florentine Media and No Limits Media co-produced the film. This documentary expands on the film that Artemis Joukowsky produced and directed in 2012 entitled Two Who Dared: The Sharps' War. One major addition was Tom Hanks as the voice actor for Waitstill Sharp.
