= 1946 United States House of Representatives elections in Massachusetts =

The 1946 United States House of Representatives elections in Massachusetts were held on November 5, 1946, to determine who will represent the U.S. state of Massachusetts in the United States House of Representatives. Massachusetts had fourteen seats in the House, apportioned according to the 1940 United States census. Representatives are elected for two-year terms.

== Overview ==
1946 United States House of Representatives elections in Massachusetts
Party	Votes	Percentage	Seats	+/–
Republican	863,274	53.37%	9	-1
Democratic	744,765	46.04%	5	+1
Prohibition	9,249	0.57%	0	-
Independents/Write-ins	26	0.00%	0	-
Totals	1,617,314	100.00%	14	-

== Results ==
Final results from the Clerk of the House of Representatives:

=== District 1 ===
1946 Massachusetts's 1st congressional district election
Party	Candidate	Votes	%
Republican	John W. Heselton (incumbent)	59,222	58.0
Democratic	John J. Falvey	40,549	39.7
Prohibition	Chester M. Delf	2,278	0.0
Total votes		102,049	100.0
Republican hold			

=== District 2 ===
1946 Massachusetts's 2nd congressional district election
Party	Candidate	Votes	%
Republican	Charles R. Clason (incumbent)	59,754	51.4
Democratic	Foster Furcolo	56,459	48.6
Total votes		116,213	100.0
Republican hold			

=== District 3 ===
Massachusetts's 3rd congressional district, 1946
Party	Candidate	Votes	%
Democratic	Philip J. Philbin (incumbent)	69,038	62.2
Republican	Carroll H. Balcom	42,033	37.8
Total votes		111,072	100.0
Democratic hold			

=== District 4 ===
1946 Massachusetts's 4th congressional district election
Party	Candidate	Votes	%
Democratic	Harold Donohue	59,847	49.5
Republican	Pehr G. Holmes (incumbent)	58,663	48.5
Prohibition	Oliver M. Frazer	2,415	2.0
Total votes		120,925	100.0
Democratic gain from Republican			

=== District 5 ===
1946 Massachusetts's 5th congressional district election
Party	Candidate	Votes	%
Republican	Edith Nourse Rogers (incumbent)	98,488	71.6
Democratic	Oliver S. Allen	38,575	28.0
Prohibition	Harriet Slade	486	0.4
Write-in		3	0.0
Total votes		137,552	100.0
Republican hold			

=== District 6 ===
Massachusetts's 6th congressional district, 1946
Party	Candidate	Votes	%
Republican	George J. Bates (incumbent)	79,709	70.2
Democratic	Richard B. O'Keefe	33,823	29.8
Write-in		4	0.0
Total votes		113,536	100.0
Republican hold			

=== District 7 ===
1946 Massachusetts's 7th congressional district election
Party	Candidate	Votes	%
Democratic	Thomas J. Lane (incumbent)	59,871	60.7
Republican	Ernest Bentley	37,250	37.8
Prohibition	Freeman W. Follett	1,433	1.5
Total votes		98,554	100.0
Democratic hold			

=== District 8 ===
1946 Massachusetts's 8th congressional district election
Party	Candidate	Votes	%
Republican	Angier Goodwin (incumbent)	76,305	63.5
Democratic	Anthony M. Roche	43,827	36.5
Total votes		120,132	100.0
Republican hold			

=== District 9 ===
1946 Massachusetts's 9th congressional district election
Party	Candidate	Votes	%
Republican	Charles L. Gifford (incumbent)	69,831	60.8
Democratic	William McAuliffe	43,367	37.8
Prohibition	Grace Farnsworth Luder	1,601	1.4
Total votes		114,799	100.0
Republican hold			

=== District 10 ===
1946 Massachusetts's 10th congressional district election
Party	Candidate	Votes	%
Republican	Christian Herter (incumbent)	96,607	64.0
Democratic	Paul J. McCarty	54,421	36.0
Total votes		151,028	100.0
Republican hold			

=== District 11 ===
==== Democratic primary ====
Joseph Russo, candidate for the Democratic nomination, attacked the qualifications of John F. Kennedy, describing him as "young squirt". He also criticised Kennedy's use of his wealth in his campaign.

1946 Massachusetts's 11th congressional district Democratic primary
Party	Candidate	Votes	%
Democratic	John F. Kennedy	22,183	42.41%
Democratic	Michael J. Neville	11,341	21.68%
Democratic	John F. Cotter	6,677	12.76%
Democratic	Joseph Russo	5,661	10.82%
Democratic	Catherine E. Falvey	2,446	4.68%
Democratic	Joseph Lee	1,848	3.53%
Democratic	Joseph Russo	799	1.53%
Democratic	Michael DeLuca	536	1.03%
Democratic	Francis N. Rooney	521	1.00%
Democratic	Robert B. DiFruscio	298	0.57%
Total votes		52,310	100.00%

==== General election ====
1946 Massachusetts's 11th congressional district election
Party	Candidate	Votes	%
Democratic	John F. Kennedy	69,093	71.87%
Republican	Lester Bowen	26,007	27.05%
Prohibition	Philip Geer	1,036	1.08%
Total votes		96,136	100.00%
Democratic hold			

=== District 12 ===
1946 Massachusetts's 12th congressional district election
Party	Candidate	Votes	%
Democratic	John W. McCormack (incumbent)	92,622	100
Write-in		14	0.0
Total votes		92,636	100.0
Democratic hold			

=== District 13 ===
1946 Massachusetts's 13th congressional district election
Party	Candidate	Votes	%
Republican	Richard B. Wigglesworth (incumbent)	87,839	67.5
Democratic	James J. Goode Jr.	42,274	32.5
Write-in		1	0.0
Total votes		130,114	100.0
Republican hold			

=== District 14 ===
1946 Massachusetts's 13th congressional district election
Party	Candidate	Votes	%
Republican	Joseph W. Martin Jr. (incumbent)	71,566	67.5
Democratic	Martha Sharp	40,999	32.5
Write-in		3	0.0
Total votes		112,568	100.0
Republican hold			

== See also ==
- 1946 United States House of Representatives elections
