= Elisabeth Anthony Dexter =

American social historian

Elisabeth Anthony Dexter was a social historian who contributed the longest-lived service in southern Europe on behalf of refugees from Nazi Germany, including Jews, of any American churchwoman during World War II.

== Early life and career ==
Elisabeth Williams Anthony was born on April 7, 1887, in Bangor, Maine, the oldest child of Harriet Angell and the Reverend Alfred Anthony. Among her prominent Anthony relatives in Rhode Island was Elisabeth's grandfather, Lewis Anthony, who was a cousin of Susan B. Anthony and of Henry B. Anthony, who had served as President ‘’pro tempore’’ of the U.S. Senate. Lewis Anthony had made a fortune as a shoe wholesaler and had endowed the historic black college at Harper’s Ferry, West Virginia, Storer College. When she was twelve, her mother, Harriet, drowned, and Elisabeth was cared for by aunts. Elisabeth was a good student and finished at or near the top of her class when she earned her degree in Philosophy from Bates College in 1908. She subsequently received a Master’s degree in Sociology at Columbia University. During her graduate studies, Elisabeth started to identify with the feminist movement and decided to join the Unitarian Church, leaving her father’s liberal denomination of Free Baptists. In 1914, she married Robert Dexter, a social worker, and they had two children, Lewis and Harriet. At the end of the war, Elisabeth and Robert studied for doctorates at Clark University and completed their degrees in 1927: Elisabeth in history and Robert in sociology. Elisabeth eventually published her dissertation, a social history of 17th and 18th century America, ‘’Colonial Women of Affairs: Women in business and the Professions in America Before 1776,’’ Houghton Mifflin Company, 1931. Elisabeth and Robert then accepted positions on the faculty of Skidmore College.

== World War II ==
In 1927, the Dexters moved to Cambridge, Massachusetts, when Robert assumed a position with the American Unitarian Association. Although Elisabeth worked as a tutor for a time at Radcliffe, her academic career began to fade. In the spring of 1941, Elisabeth Dexter joined her husband at the Unitarian Service Committee in Lisbon Portugal. Neutral Lisbon was an important haven and port for refugees who had escaped from Vichy France. In Lisbon, she assumed increasing responsibility for refugee assistance and she maintained a program to assist refugees with the paperwork they needed to emigrate. She would remain in Lisbon for most of the remaining years of the war and by 1944, she was European director of the Unitarian Service Committee, which added offices in Geneva and Paris later in the war. In Lisbon, she oversaw a relief program to sustain Jewish refugees who were stranded in Portugal in ‘’residence force’’ as they awaited opportunities to emigrate.

In 1942, she accepted a major role with the Office of Strategic Services to help pass information to the OSS and to recruit Spanish and other refugees to participate in various missions. Her code name was Cornette, and she reported to OSS officers in Lisbon, London and New York. She was said to have been one of the few people in continental Europe to have been briefed on the precise timing of the Allied landings in North Africa in 1942.

== Later life ==
Elisabeth and Robert Dexter resigned from the Unitarian Service Committee in late 1944 and worked for a time with the Church Peace Union. After the war, Elisabeth continued with historical research and published her book, ‘’Career Women of America: 1776-1840’’. She also worked on a memoir of their work during World War II, “Last Port of Freedom,” but the manuscript was not completed. She died in Belmont, Massachusetts, in 1972.

== Honours and awards ==
=== Foreign honours ===
- Czechoslovakia: Knight of the Order of the White Lion (1946)
