= Erica Wallach =

German political activist

Erica Wallach (1923 - 22 December 1993) was a German political activist and teacher. A strong opponent of totalitarianism in Europe, she was held in a Soviet prison for five years during the peak of the Cold War due to suspicions of espionage. Wallach fought against military dictatorship in Spain, Nazism in Germany, and authoritarian communism in the Soviet Union. She published the memoir Light at Midnight in 1967.

== Life ==
=== Early career ===
Born Erica Glaser in Schlawe, Germany in 1922, her family moved to Spain in 1935 following Adolf Hitler’s rise to power. During the Spanish Civil War, she served as a nurse for the Loyalist faction which opposed the fascist regime of Francisco Franco. In 1939, Wallach fled to France in order to escape prosecution by the Spanish totalitarian government, but was soon captured and held in an internment camp.

In March of 1939 Wallach was released from internment due to help from former State Department official Noel Field, a member of the Disarmament Committee in the League of Nations, at which point she moved to Switzerland to live with Field and his wife Herta. After finishing her education, she worked with the German resistance to oppose Hitler’s Nazi regime. In March of 1945 she joined the KPD and in May of that year began working under Allen Dulles, the head of operations in Switzerland for the American Office of Strategic Services, which would later become the CIA.

=== Post-war ===
After the end of World War II, Wallach worked for the Office of Strategic Services in Germany until January of 1946. She remained a member of the German Communist Party until 1948, before moving to Paris with her husband, American Army Captain Robert Wallach. In 1949, Noel and Herta Field disappeared in Czechoslovakia, prompting Erica Wallach to travel to Berlin on a tip that doing so would enable her to contact her missing friends.

However, Wallach was quickly arrested by communist authorities upon her arrival in Berlin in 1950, apparently revealing the tip to have been a deliberate trap. She was initially held in East Germany and later imprisoned in the Soviet Union. Wallach was condemned to death in 1952, though her sentence was decreased to 15 years in a Siberian labor camp following the death of Joseph Stalin. She was incarcerated for a total of five years before her eventual release in 1955, when the Soviet government suddenly and unexpectedly declared her innocent.

=== Post-imprisonment ===
In 1957, two years after her release during which time she was not allowed to travel to the USA due to her previous Communist party association, Wallach joined her family in Warrenton, Virginia in the United States and became a teacher of French and Latin at Highland School, where she worked for 18 years. In Virginia, Wallach was a member of the American Society for the Prevention of Cruelty to Animals. According to her son, architect Robert S. Wallach, she "was not politically active at all."

In 1967, Wallach published a memoir titled Light at Midnight. Her life has been the subject of both a documentary and a play.

Wallach died of cancer on 22 December 1993 at the age of 71.
