= Unitarian Universalist Service Committee =

Relief organization affiliated with the Unitarian Universalist Association

- Abbreviation: UUSC
- Formation: May 1940
- Type: Non-profit human rights organization
- Headquarters: Cambridge, Massachusetts, United States
- Website: www.uusc.org

The Unitarian Universalist Service Committee (UUSC) is a non-profit, nonsectarian associate member organization of the Unitarian Universalist Association that works to provide disaster relief and promote human rights and social justice around the world.

UUSC was founded in May 1940 as the Unitarian Service Committee with the intended purpose of assisting European refugees endangered by Nazi persecution. The founding director was Robert Dexter, who had served in a diplomatic role for the American Unitarian Association for more than a decade and had been moved, in particular, by the plight of refugees in Czechoslovakia, a country with a large Unitarian congregation. The organization established an office in Lisbon and the first American Unitarians to be posted there were Rev. Waitstill Hastings Sharp, a minister of the Unitarian Church in Wellesley Hills, Massachusetts, and his wife Martha. Later, Rev. Charles R. Joy, Elisabeth Anthony Dexter and Noel Field were recruited to work in the organization's Lisbon and Marseille offices and they, along with many refugee volunteers, expanded the relief and emigration programs. The Sharps were posthumously honored by Israel in 2006 as the second and third Americans to be added to the list of Righteous Among the Nations.

The organization’s first board of directors was chaired by William Emerson, the former dean of the MIT School of Architecture. Other board members included Harold Hitz Burton, mayor of Cleveland, Ohio, and a future Supreme Court justice; Percival Brundage, senior partner in the Price Waterhouse and future budget director for President Dwight D. Eisenhower; Louise Wright, chairwoman of the voters department of government and foreign policy for the League of Women Voters.

Today, UUSC is involved in coordinating humanitarian efforts and documenting human rights abuses worldwide. Its programs focus on Migrant Justice, Climate/Disaster Justice, and International Justice and Accountability. In recent years, the organization has been active in addressing a range of issues, including U.S. immigration policies, climate change and environmental justice for Indigenous communities, supporting civil society organizations in Haiti, providing aid to communities affected by the Russian invasion of Ukraine, and advocating for accountability for human rights abuses and war crimes committed by the Burmese military against ethnic minorities, including the Rohingya population.

== See also ==
- Refugee workers in Vichy France
