= Lois Gunden =

American "Righteous Among the Nations"

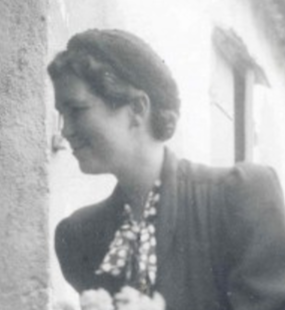
- Lois Gunden, c. 1942
- Born: February 25, 1915; Flanagan, Illinois, U.S.
- Died: August 27, 2005 (aged 90); Lansdale, Pennsylvania, U.S.
- Other names: Lois Mary Clemens; Lois Gunden Clemens
- Education: Goshen College B.A. Peabody College M.A.
- Occupation: French professor
- Known for: Rescuing children during World War II
- Awards: Righteous Among the Nations (2013)

Lois Gunden (February 25, 1915 – August 27, 2005) was the fourth of five Americans to be recognized as Righteous Among the Nations by Yad Vashem, the Shoah Martyrs' and Heroes' Remembrance Authority of Israel. Working for the Mennonite Central Committee, she helped establish an orphanage and rescue mission for children in Southern France during World War II. She rescued some children directly from Camp de Rivesaltes, an internment camp.

Gunden remained in France after having been considered an enemy alien. The Germans arrested her in early 1943 and treated her like a diplomat until early 1944. She was held in hotels until a prisoner exchange allowed for her release. She returned to the United States in March 1944, and by the fall she returned to her position as a French professor at Goshen College, and later at Temple University. She wrote a memoir about her experiences in Europe during the war.

== Early life ==
Lois Mary Gunden was born on February 25, 1915, in Flanagan, Illinois to Agnes Albrecht and Christian Gunden. Her family, with nine children, were Mennonites. They moved to Goshen, Indiana to have their children educated at the college. Seven of the nine children earned degrees.

She received her bachelor's degree in 1936 at Goshen College. Three years later she received her master's degree from Peabody College. Having majored in French, she took a position at Goshen College teaching the language.

== World War II ==
Gunden joined the Mennonite Central Committee and on October 4, 1941, boarded the S.S. Excambion in New York for Portugal, which was a neutral country at the time. She traveled overland with another Mennonite woman through Spain and into Vichy France, ultimately arriving at Canet-en-Roussillon. (Note: Bartrop said that she was headed for Lyon, France.) She worked for the Secours Mennonite aux Enfants (Mennonite Children's Rescue) beginning on October 22, 1941. The Œuvre de secours aux enfants and the Quaker American Friends Service Committee also assisted in Gunden's efforts. Some of the staff employed at the mission were also refugees.

Seeking to help children who needed shelter and care, she helped establish an orphanage and rescue mission. Called the Ville St. Christophe, it was located about 30 miles (48 km) north of the border with Spain. The 20-room residence, in the town of Cante-Plage (now Canet-en-Roussillon), initially housed and cared for sixty children, some who were Jewish and others who were Spanish refugees from the Spanish Civil War. The children, some of whom were "severely malnourished", had come from the Camp de Rivesaltes, an internment camp. The children at the mission ranged from four years of age to sixteen. The conditions at the crowded camp, located 12 miles (19 km) from Canet-en-Roussillon, were unhealthy and unsanitary. Gunden said of the camp, "Sight of bunks with people sitting hunchbacked on them… dirty and bare kitchens… eagerness with which the children drank milk." The children generally had lice. Their initial goals were to remove lice from the children's hair, bathe them, get the children on a proper diet, and improve their health. Overwhelmed, the woman who had traveled with Gunden had a nervous breakdown and returned to the United States. Several dozen children were later rescued from the internment camp by Gunden, sometimes with hard-fought approval from their parents. This became an especially pressing concern in 1942 for Gunden to prevent children from being deported from the camps by the Germans. Once the children were in better health, she wanted them to have typical childhoods, with chores, learning, and playing on the beach. Gunden wrote her intention in her diary "May I show kindness and gentleness to the children that they do not get from others".

Mary Elmes, a Quaker relief worker, visited the mission regularly and gave Gunden helpful advice. Elmes was aware of Nazi Germany's plans for Jews and kept Gunden informed of the potential risks and dangers. Even though the Germans had begun mass murder in extermination camps using poisonous gas, it was not known. Elmes was aware, though, of the movement of Jews to concentration camps where they would suffer starvation and extermination. Thousands of Jews were sent from Rivesaltes to those deadly destinations. Originally, the assumption was that once children were in better health, they would be returned to the internment camp, but once Gunden knew the Nazis' plans, she kept children at the mission. She also took in Jewish children who were not ill or orphaned. Generally, the Vichy French did not seem to keep tabs on children after they left the internment camp.

One of the children taken from Rivesaltes was Ginette (Drucker) Kalish, about 12 years old, from Paris. Her father was transported in July 1942 to Auschwitz concentration camp by the Germans and Ginette and her mother were caught and taken to Rivesaltes. Gunden convinced her mother to let Ginette be taken to the mission. In another incident, a police officer came to arrest three children — Berthe, Claire, and Jacques Landesmann — intending to deport them. Gunden used a series of stall tactics until at last the police officer gave up and did not return. The Landesmann children survived the war.

By November 1942, when North Africa was stormed by American and British troops, she was considered an enemy alien and in January 1943, Germans arrested her and treated her like a diplomat. She first stayed in a hotel in Southern France and then was transferred with two other Mennonite relief workers to another hotel in Baden-Baden with diplomats from North America. The 140 people that stayed at the hotel included relief workers, journalists, and diplomats. She was released as part of a prisoner exchange effort for German diplomats, arriving in New York City on March 15, 1944, on the Gripsholm.

Meanwhile, the children had been dispersed and hidden in numerous safe places.

== After the war ==
After a lecture tour and teaching Spanish during the summer, Gunden resumed her position at Goshen College in the fall of 1944. In 1945, Gunden published a memoir of her World War II experiences. In 1958, having furthered her studies of the French language, she received a Ph.D. from Indiana University.

Gunden was active in the Mennonite Church and she volunteered for other relief projects in Puerto Rico, Mexico, and in the United States. At Goshen College, Gunden taught French and sat on its board of overseers. She edited a national publication about women's missionary services and wrote a book entitled Women Liberated. She also taught at Temple University.

On June 21, 1958, Gunden married Ernest Clemens, and became a stepmother to Clemens' daughter. They lived together in Lansdale, Pennsylvania after the wedding. She died on February 27, 2005, in Lansdale.

A girl that Gunden saved, Ginette Kalish, nominated her for the title of Righteous Among the Nations, which was awarded by Yad Vashem on February 27, 2013.

== See also ==
- Helga Holbek, Mary Elmes and Alice Resch, who with Gunden helped save Jewish and Spanish Civil War refugees, also earning the title Righteous Among the Nations

== Bibliography ==
- Gragg, Rod (2016). My brother's keeper : Christians who risked all to protect Jewish targets of the Holocaust. New York : Center Street. ISBN 978-1-4555-6629-7.
