= Helga Holbek =

Danish humanitarian activist

Helga Dorph Holbek, sometimes Holbeck (18 April 1897 – 25 November 1983), was a Danish humanitarian activist, honored in 1982 as Righteous Among the Nations for her work in Vichy France during World War II. She headed the Quaker-led American Friends Service Committee (AFSC) office in Toulouse, providing aid to people interned in concentration camps and rescuing hundreds of children, concealing their identities and placing them with French families or in children's group homes. The AFSC also assisted Jews and other people fleeing France to neutral Spain.

Much of Holbek's work during World War II was illegal under the regulations of occupied France and Nazi Germany.

== Early life ==
Helga Holbek was born in Copenhagen to a wealthy family. From 1929 until 1939 she ran a travel agency in London which encouraged exchange visits for teachers and students between Britain and European countries. When World War II began in 1939, tourism and exchange visits came to an end.

In November 1939, Holbeck accepted a job in Toulouse, France, with the International Commission for Assistance to Child Refugees. The commission, headed by Quaker Howard Kershner, was made up of representatives of several humanitarian organizations, especially British and American Quakers. The Commission administered sixteen children's colonies in France for refugees from the Spanish Civil War. Holbek became the commission's representative in Toulouse, near the children's colonies.

== World War II ==
The invasion and conquest of France in May 1940 by Nazi Germany led to the influx of large numbers of refugees, including many foreign Jews, fleeing areas of Nazi control and influence. The Quakers continued to assist Spanish refugees in camps, but their attention also turned toward Jewish refugees who were also confined in camps scattered around southern France.

Holbeck, as head of the American Friends Service Committee in Toulouse, assembled a team of women including Norwegian Alice Resch and Irish Mary Elmes, in cooperation with American Mennonite Lois Gunden, to work in the refugee camps with a priority of aiding children. When hiring Resch, Holbek emphasized the Quaker philosophy of strict neutrality in their work. She said, "You have to choose if you want to work for the Quakers or for the resistance. We can't risk compromising our work. If you are discovered it will be the end of us." That view changed as Holbek and her team recognized the threat to Jews and Jewish children from the Nazis and the government of Vichy France.

Holbek disgreed on many issues with her supervisor, Howard Kershner, resident in Marseille. Kershner wanted to maintain strict adherence to the rules of the Vichy Government with less emphasis by Holbek and other Quaker employees on helping Jews. He seemed immune to the poor living conditions in the refugee camps and wanted the care and immigration of Jewish refugees to be the responsibility of Jewish organizations such as the Œuvre de secours aux enfants (OSE). In April 1942, Kershner was relieved of his position. His removal coincided with the first roundups of Jews in France and their deportation to an unknown fate in German concentration camps which lent urgency to the AFSC's efforts to protect Jewish children.

The response by Holbek and her team in Toulouse was to maintain Quaker neutrality on the surface and in the aid to refugees in the camps, but to undertake clandestine activities to help children leave the refugee camps. They hid the children in children's homes, smuggled them into neutral Spain and Switzerland, or changed their names and placed them with French Christian families. Holbek supervised sixteen institutions, housing, hiding and protecting refugee children in southern France.

When the United States invaded North Africa in November 1942, all Americans were ordered to leave France. The AFSC found it prudent to reconstitute itself as a French organization called Secours Quaker (French for 'Quaker Help'). Holbek, Resch, and Elmes remained in France throughout the war, running the children's homes and providing aid to refugees interned in several camps in southern France. Gunden, an American, was arrested but repatriated to the United States in 1944 as part of a prisoner exchange agreement.

=== Visit to Normandy ===
On behalf of the Quakers, Holbek visited Normandy from 25 October to 2 November 1944 to assess humanitarian conditions in the wake of the Normandy invasion by Allied military forces. She found "massive destruction of many cities and towns and hundreds of thousands of people without the barest essentials. They are cold, have nowhere to live, no blankets, no change of underwear, no shoes, no pots to do a little cooking." Her report stimulated Quaker assistance to Normandy.

== After the war ==
In July 1945, after the end of World War II in Europe, Holbek left Caen where she was working and traveled home to Denmark. She subsequently visited the United States for six months and worked for UNICEF in Poland. In 1957 she became a travel guide again. After retirement from work she created a program to help elderly people which was adopted by the Danish Red Cross under the name "Visiting Friends." In 1982, she was honored as Righteous Among the Nations by Israel, in recognition of her work during World War II.
