= Martha Sharp =

American humanitarian and social justice advocate

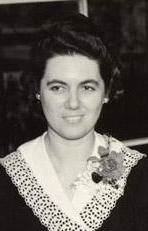
- Sharp in 1939
- Born: Martha Alice Dickie; April 25, 1905; Providence, Rhode Island, U.S.
- Died: December 6, 1999 (aged 94); Providence, Rhode Island, U.S.
- Education: Pembroke College in Brown University (BA); Northwestern University (Social Work); Radcliffe College (MA)
- Occupations: Social worker; humanitarian
- Known for: Rescue of children in World War II Europe
- Spouses: Waitstill Sharp (m. 1927; div. 1954) David H. Cogan (m. 1957)
- Children: Hastings Sharp (b. 1932); Martha Content Sharp Joukowsky (b. 1937)
- Parents: James Edward Ingham; Elizabeth Alice Whelan

Martha Ingham Dickie Sharp Cogan (April 25, 1905 – December 6, 1999) was an American Unitarian who was involved in humanitarian and social justice work with her first husband, a Unitarian minister, Waitstill Sharp, and others of her denomination, and so helped hundreds of refugees, including Jews, to escape Nazi persecution, through relocation and other efforts. In September 2005, Martha and Waitstill Sharp were named by the Yad Vashem organization as "Righteous Among the Nations", the second and third of five Americans to receive this honor. The subsequent ceremony involved the presentation of a medal and certificate of honor to the Sharps' daughter, Martha Sharp Joukowsky, amidst a large audience that included one of the children that her parents had helped get out of France, Eva Esther Feigl.

== Early life ==
Martha Ingham Dickie was born in Providence, Rhode Island on April 25, 1905, the daughter of James Edward Ingham and Elizabeth Alice Whelan. She graduated from Pembroke College. In 1926, she continued her studies at Northwestern University Recreation Training School in the field of social work; with her work and studies centered at the Hull House in Chicago. Her devotion to service and helping others has been cited as the reason she entered the field. When her training at Northwestern was complete, she accepted the position of Director of Girls’ Work at Hull House, where she acted as social worker to oversee 500 girls.

She married Waitstill Sharp in 1927, and took temporary leave from her work. In 1928, Waitstill enrolled in a master's program at Harvard Divinity School, in Cambridge, Massachusetts. At the same time, Martha began and subsequently completed an M.A. in literature at Radcliffe College in the same community. They had two children, Hastings (b. 1932) and Martha (b. 1937).

Martha followed Waitstill to Meadville, Pennsylvania, when he was assigned to a small church after his ordination as a Unitarian minister in 1933. There, she served as a second minister, organizing youth work, educational activities, women's meetings, and church suppers. As her husband was found, by congregants, to be difficult to talk to, church members would go to Martha "who was always happy to lend an ear". In 1937 the couple moved to Wellesley, Massachusetts, after Waitstill accepted a position at Wellesley Hills Unitarian Church. The couple separated after World War II, and were divorced in 1954.

In 1957, she married David H. Cogan, a wealthy Jewish businessman and inventor, and devoted herself to charitable and humanitarian causes here and abroad, serving on the boards of Hadassah, the Girls Clubs of America, and other nonprofit organizations. Martha Sharp died in 1999, at the age of 94 in Providence, Rhode Island. She was survived by her daughter, Martha Sharp Joukowsky, a retired Brown University professor and her son, Waitstill Hastings Sharp Jr.

== Career ==
=== World War II rescue and related activities ===
As the events of early-World War II unfolded in Europe, the Sharps began an "International Relations Club". Following the Munich Pact which ceded the Sudetenland (part of Czechoslovakia) to Germany, Sharp and her husband (alongside many American Unitarians) felt that something must be done to give assistance to the victims of persecution. The American Unitarian Association (AUA) raised funds, allowing the Sharps to travel to Prague on 4 February 1939 as representatives of the commission for service. In the same period, Robert Dexter, head of the Department of Social Relations for the executive committee of the AUA, traveled to Europe with Quaker representative Richard Wood to make contacts in Geneva, London, and Paris, and thus to create a network of relief workers and sympathetic politicians across Europe. They sent back a report in November 1938, stating that over 20,000 people would need immediate emigration assistance. Under Dexter's leadership, a temporary committee was formed to help endangered refugees, and in May 1940 the organization was officially founded as the Unitarian Service Committee.

Martha and Waitstill Sharp were recruited to work in Czechoslovakia, where a large community of Unitarians were present under the leadership of Norbert Capek. Later Martha and Waitstill recalled grave misgivings about leaving their children of seven and two, but they were convinced they would be well taken care of living with family friends inside the parsonage. Their church would be headed by Everett Baker in their absence.

On 14 March 1939, the Nazis were quickly advancing on Prague, but the Sharps decided to remain and continue their program, which was the most significant private American effort on behalf of endangered refugees in Czechoslovakia. In Prague, the Sharps worked closely with members of the American Friends Service Committee (Quakers) to advance refugees' visa applications to Great Britain and elsewhere. Along with Waitstill, Martha administered a relief program after seeking advice from Alice Masaryk and other prominent Czechs.

On one occasion, Martha Sharp escorted 35 refugees, ranging from politicians to children whose parents had committed suicide, to Great Britain. On a different occasion, she arranged for children to leave—in accordance with local narrowing-law—by the "Care of Children from Germany", a British organization (see Kindertransport). In the summer, the Gestapo closed their offices, but Martha continued until August, and stopped only after learning that she faced arrest.

=== Lisbon, 1940 ===
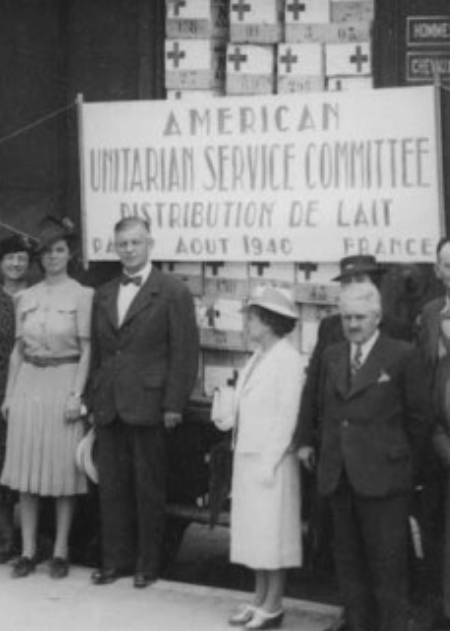
Waitstill and Martha Sharp (first and second on left) distribute milk for children in France, August 1940.

In May 1940, the president of the AUA, Frederick Eliot, and the USC's director, Robert Dexter, asked Martha and Waitstill to go to France as their "ambassadors extraordinary," to which the Sharps agreed. The plan for a Paris office was canceled because France surrendered to the Nazis that spring. Instead, the Sharps set up an office in neutral Portugal.

From their base in Lisbon, Martha and Waitstill were able to help a number of Jewish children and several prominent intellectuals to escape Vichy France, including the German-Jewish novelist Lion Feuchtwanger. Working with Donald and Helen Lowrie of the YMCA, Martha also provided assistance to the families of Czech soldiers who were stranded in France and were hoping to use a sea route for escape. At the end of her 1940 posting in Europe, Martha escorted 27 children and 10 adults to America.

=== Post-Lisbon and World War II ===
In 1943, Martha founded "Children to Palestine," with support from the Jewish women's organization Hadassah. In this new role, Martha raised money for orphaned Jewish youth in Europe to start new lives in Palestine. In 1944, Martha returned to Lisbon, assuming the position of Associate European Director of the Unitarian Service Committee. In that capacity, she successfully negotiated the release of a number of Spanish refugees imprisoned in Portugal.

In 1946 she ran for congress, losing to incumbent Joe Martin, who would later become Speaker of the House. During the campaign, he called her a "little girl", although she was 41 years old. She lost in a landslide with 36.4% of the vote.

In 1950, Martha accepted a position in the National Security Resources Board, which would mobilize resources in the event of a Soviet attack. She resigned as President Dwight Eisenhower was inaugurated, and moved back to New York. By then, her marriage with Waitstill had degraded, and the two separated, believing the hardships they had endured during World War II were just too much. She remarried, and took the name Cogan.

== Honors and legacy ==
=== Honors ===
On 9 September 2005, Martha and Waitstill Sharp were named by the historical remembrance organization Yad Vashem as "Righteous Among the Nations", labeled as individuals who risked their lives to help Jews escape the Holocaust despite danger to themselves and others. The group cited the couple's "meritorious assistance to other Jewish fugitives of Nazi terror", showing much bravery. the second and third Americans so honored (after Varian Fry), with their names being inscribed in a wall in Jerusalem. Eva Feigl gave a speech on that date, describing how she never forgot Martha Sharp when they got to America.

An educational curriculum including the Sharps is featured at the United States Holocaust Memorial Museum.

A Ken Burns documentary film, Defying the Nazis: The Sharps' War (2012), that chronicled the efforts of Waitstill and Martha Sharp, was co-directed by Burns and their grandson, Artemis Joukowsky III, of Sherborn, Massachusetts, and co-produced by Burns, Joukowsky, and Matthew Justus, with the support of PBS (including the WETA station), the Unitarian Universalist community, several well-known foundations, and many individuals.

=== Foreign honors ===
- Czechoslovakia: Knight of the Order of the White Lion (1946)
