= Robert Dexter =

American humanitarian and Unitarian Univeralist

Robert Cloutman Dexter (October 1, 1887 – 1955) was the founder of the Unitarian Service Committee (progenitor of the Unitarian Universalist Service Committee), which worked before and during World War II to rescue and assist refugees from Nazi Germany. Dexter headed the Unitarian's office in Lisbon, Portugal during World War II. The Unitarians and other humanitarian organizations helped thousands of intellectuals and artists, many of them Jews, fleeing the Nazis to emigrate to safety in the United States and other countries. Dexter also worked with the clandestine Office of Strategic Services (OSS), providing information about Nazi Germany to the U.S. from his network of refugee workers in France, Spain, and Portugal.

== Early life ==
Dexter was born on October 1, 1887, in Shelburne, Nova Scotia of an American mother and a Canadian father, who was a sea captain. Robert grew up in Boston and graduated from Brown University in 1912 with a B.A. and later acquired an M.A. from Brown. Over the next years he served as a social worker for a number of small organizations and with the entry of the United States into World War I he worked for the American Red Cross, supervising camps for soldiers in the South East. In 1915, he married Elisabeth Anthony, and they both studied for doctorates at Clark University, he in sociology and Elisabeth in history. They both taught at Skidmore College from 1923 to 1927, and moved to Cambridge Massachusetts in 1927 when Robert Dexter accepted a position as head of the Departments of Social and International Relations for the American Unitarian Association, a job that entailed many visits to liberal religious congregations in Europe.

== Czechoslovakia ==
In 1937 and 1938, Dexter, Director of Foreign Relations of the American Unitarian Association, and his wife visited Czechoslovakia and the congregation in Prague led by Norbert Capek, which at that time was the largest Unitarian congregation in the world. The Unitarians and the Dexters also had strong ties to the Masaryk family. During this period, Dexter wrote detailed reports on the plight of refugees in the Sudetenland and Czechoslovakia and Jewish refugees from Austria (which was annexed by Nazi Germany in 1938). He proposed a new organization to help refugees which would be modeled on that of the American Friends Service Committee (Quakers). Prior to Dexter's initiatives the American Unitarians had not been involved in helping refugees. Unlike the Quakers, however, the Unitarians took sides. Unitarian Charles R. Joy said, "I conceive our work to be strengthening of the side which we believe to be right."

With permission from his Board of Directors, Dexter recruited a Unitarian minister, Waitstill Sharp and his wife Martha, to go to Czechoslovakia in early 1939 to help the refugees, At the time more than 200,000 refugees, many of them Jews, from Nazi Germany, Austria, and the Sudetenland were in Czechoslovakia and living under difficult conditions. Martha and Waitstill Sharp remained in the country after the Germans occupied Czechoslovakia in early 1939, and they were effective in their programs for both relief and emigration. The success of the Sharps’ activities increased momentum for the founding of the Unitarian Service Committee, which was officially launched in the spring of 1940, for the purpose of helping endangered refugees. Robert Dexter became executive director of the organization.

== Aid vs emigration ==
World War II was underway, but the United States was still a neutral when the Sharps returned to Europe to focus on helping refugees in France after the country fell to Nazi Germany in June 1940. They had the dual objective of providing aid to needy people and refugees plus aiding in the emigration of threatened people from Vichy France, still unoccupied but heavily influenced by the Germans. Dexter opposed aid to people in France. He wanted the Sharps to focus on emigration, helping intellectuals and artists, the kulturträgers (transmitters of culture), escape the Nazis. Dexter in the Unitarian office in Boston believed that relief aid to people in Vichy France, a near-puppet state of the Germans, helped the Nazis. In June 1941, he agreed with the statement by another Unitarian that "A few men and women of ability and prominence saved are more worthwhile than a hundred to whom we simply give a bit of food and whose agony we help to prolong." The opposite view was expressed by Charles Joy in March 1941. "It is better to keep 6,000 children alive in France than take a hundred or so to America."

Waitstill Sharp felt betrayed by his old friend, Dexter, and the Sharps continued their dual programs of aid and emigration in France despite Dexter's opposition.

Dexter and his wife Elisabeth arrived in Lisbon, Portugal on 24 April 1941 to take charge of the Unitarian office there, replacing Charles Joy. Dexter was in Portugal for six months. During 1941, the Unitarians helped 541 refugees leave Portugal, mostly to the United States but about one-fifth went to Latin America. About one-third of the refugees were also helped by Varian Fry's Emergency Rescue Committee in Marseille.

== The OSS ==
In July 1942, while still working for the Unitarians, Robert and Elisabeth Dexter accepted an assignment with the Office of Strategic Services and were given the code names “Corn” and "Cornette" They returned to Portugal and agreed to deliver money to French resistance leaders. Elisabeth and he collected information about the Germans for the OSS. On behalf of both the Unitarians and the OSS, Dexter traveled to France and Switzerland from his office in Lisbon in September and October 1942 with the dual purpose of picking up the pieces of Varian Fry's organization after his departure and setting up a network of Unitarians who would spy for the OSS in addition to their programs to help refugees.

In 1944, Dexter became the representative of the U.S. War Refugee Board in Portugal. In October 1944, both Dexters resigned from the Unitarian Service Committee, apparently irritated that Charles Joy had received a promotion. In November he resigned from the War Refugee Board. Dexter wanted to continue to work with the OSS, but in January 1945, the OSS declined to recommend him for a passport with the comment that Dexter "was temperamentally indiscreet" and "better suited for welfare work than for our type operations." Dexter's wife had concealed from him her knowledge of the date of the American army's landing in North Africa.

In his later years, Dexter worked for the Church Peace Union. Dexter found his loyalty to the United States in question during the McCarthy era because of his association with Noel Field, a suspected spy for the Soviet Union. The U.S. cancelled his security clearance. Dexter died in 1955 following an extended period of depression.

== Honours and awards ==
=== Foreign honours ===
- Czechoslovakia: Officer of the Order of the White Lion (1946)

== Bibliography ==
- Lewis Anthony Dexter, A Memoir of Elisabeth Anthony Dexter, Social Background and Personal Meaning of a Type of Feminist Research, 17 pp., unpublished essay, in possession of the author, cited by Subak (2010), p. 275.
- Dexter, Robert C. (December 15, 1938). "And They Call This Peace". Christian Register: 740–741.
- Robert Dexter (undated, est. 1938) "Confidential Report, Czechoslovakian Mission," Robert Cloutman Dexter archives, Hay Library, Brown University. Box 14, Folder 3. as cited by Subak (2010), p. 242. See also .
- Subak, Susan Elisabeth (2010). Rescue and Flight: American Relief Workers who Defied the Nazis. Lincoln, NE: University of Nebraska Press. ISBN 978-0803230170. "William F. Schulz, contributor"
- Robert C. Dexter Profile. Office of War Information, August 21, 1944. Robert Cloutman Dexter archive, Hay Library, Brown University. See .
