= Alice Resch =

Alice Resch Synnestvedt (b. 14 December 1908, Chicago, d. 2007) was a Norwegian-American who worked in Vichy France for the American Friends Service Committee (Quakers) during World War II. In 1982, she was recognized by Yad Vashem for saving Jewish children from deportation to concentration camps in Nazi Germany.

== Early life ==
Alice Resch was born in Chicago, Illinois to Norwegian parents. In 1913 her parents returned to Norway where she grew up. As a young woman she traveled throughout Europe and studied nursing at the American Hospital of Paris, graduating in 1932. From 1932 to 1939, she worked in several places around France as a nurse. Resch was multilingual, fluent in French, German, Norwegian, and English. Her language skills facilitated her competence and versatility. She was described as "a brownish blonde with a chubby face and a dynamo in motion."

== World War II ==
In May 1940, Resch moved to Agen in southwestern France to work with refugees there. On 21 June 1940, she began her employment with the American Friends Service Committee (Quakers) in its office in Toulouse headed by Helga Holbek, a Dane. Neither of the women were Quakers. The advance of the German army after its invasion of France caused hundreds of thousands of French people to flee south to Toulouse and helping these refugees was Resch's first task. With the armistice agreement between France and Germany on 22 June, most of the French refugees returned home, but many anti-Nazi refugees, mostly Jews, from Germany and other German controlled countries remained in southern France. Southern or Vichy France would remain unoccupied by Germany until November 1942. Most of Resch's work in Toulouse was providing food and other aid to refugees, especially children. In early 1942, Resch began working in the Gurs internment camp near Toulouse, spending six months in the camp.

As 1942 progressed and German exportations of Jews, including children, from Vichy began, Resch's attention, as well as those of other refugee workers, such as Mary Elmes, also working for the Quakers, and Mennonite Lois Gunden turned to rescue in addition to relief. Efforts to obtain more exit visas to permit children to depart France were redoubled -- but succeeded for only a few hundred children. Alternatively, Jewish organizations set up children's colonies to house refugee children and found French families to shelter others who were given false names and identities. Resch participated in the clandestine escape and shelter activities at the same time that she also continued working on providing aid to refugees in camps. She said, "we worked almost daily, hiding both adults and children and securing false identity papers and ration cards. But all this was done on the sly, even among those of us in the office. We were a neutral, non-political organization after all, and foreigners to boot. We had to be very, very careful not to compromise our work in the camps and for the French children." In January 1943, Americans working for relief organizations in France were interned by the Germans. Resch, a Norwegian citizen, remained free in the Toulouse area, continuing her work with the Quakers.

Because of their previous work in Germany, the Germans allowed Quakers better access to refugees interned in camps than other aid organizations. Only the Quakers were allowed access to trains containing people being deported to Germany. In 1944, recounting one event Resch said the Germans "got worse and worse, deporting any remaining Jews, Spaniards, and Frenchmen they could get their hands on." Resch and other Quakers were allowed to visit a train full of deportees and slip water and food through the spaces between the bars closing the railway cars. Two armed German soldiers forbade them to speak to the prisoners.

Summing up the World War II work of more than a dozen refugee organizations in Vichy France, lives saved included 7,500 to 9,000 children, mostly Jews, by integrating them, with false identities, into French families or hiding them in children's colonies established in purchased chateaus. However, at least 2,000 children were deported from Vichy and died in German concentration camps. Many more refugees, both children and adults, managed to cross the French border, mostly illegally and with the help of the humanitarian organizations, into Spain or Switzerland, both neutral countries.

== Yad Vashem ==
In 1982, Resch was recognized as a Righteous Among the Nations by Yad Vashem, an Israeli Holocaust remembrance center. She supervised 16 group homes for refugee children in Vichy France. In 1941, she secured the release of 48 children from the Gurs camp and sequestered them in an orphanage in Aspet, Haute Garonne. She helped care for the children until they could be smuggled out to Switzerland in 1944. In 1943, she escorted four children to the border with Switzerland with documents that permitted their entry. In total, she assisted in the survival of 206 children.

== Later life ==
On November 27, 1943, Resch married Marcus Synnestvedt, a lawyer who lived in Toulouse. He died in 1950. Resch spent the years after the war in France in several different charitable endeavors for children. In 1960, she returned to Norway to care for her aging parents. After they died, she moved to Copenhagen and lived there the rest of her life. in 1982 and 1984 she visited Israel and met several of the people she had helped in France. In 1999, she had a reunion in Myrtle Beach, South Carolina with several of the Jewish children who had ended up in the United States. In 2002, she had another reunion in Denmark with Jewish children.

Resch's autobiography Over the Highest Mountains was published in 2005. The book is derived from an account of her experiences which she wrote to communicate with her mother who was deaf. Hal Myers, one of the children she helped, had the text translated to English and it was subsequently published.
