= Mary Elmes =

Irish aid worker, Righteous Among the Nations

- Born: Marie Elisabeth Jean Elmes; 5 May 1908; Cork, Ireland
- Died: 9 March 2002 (aged 93); Perpignan, Pyrénées-Orientales France
- Known for: Saving Jewish children from the Nazis, and being the only Irish person to receive the Righteous Among the Nations award
- Spouse: Roger Danjou
- Children: 2

Signature
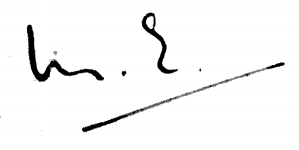

Marie Elisabeth Jean Elmes (5 May 1908 – 9 March 2002) was an Irish aid worker credited with saving the lives of at least 200 Jewish children at various times during the Holocaust, by hiding them in the back of her car. In 2015, she became the first, and to date only, Irish person honoured as Righteous Among the Nations by the State of Israel, in recognition of her work in the Spanish Civil War and World War II.

== Biography ==
Elmes was born on 5 May 1908 in Cork, Ireland to chemist Edward Elmes and his wife Elizabeth (née Waters). Edward Elmes was originally from Waterford, and moved to Cork after qualifying as a pharmacist, to run a pharmacy on Winthrop Street, while Waters grew up in Cork. Elizabeth Elmes was involved in the Irish Suffragette movement and campaigned for the vote for women as treasurer of the Munster Women's Franchise League. Mary had one brother, John, who later took over the family business. The family belonged to the Church of Ireland.

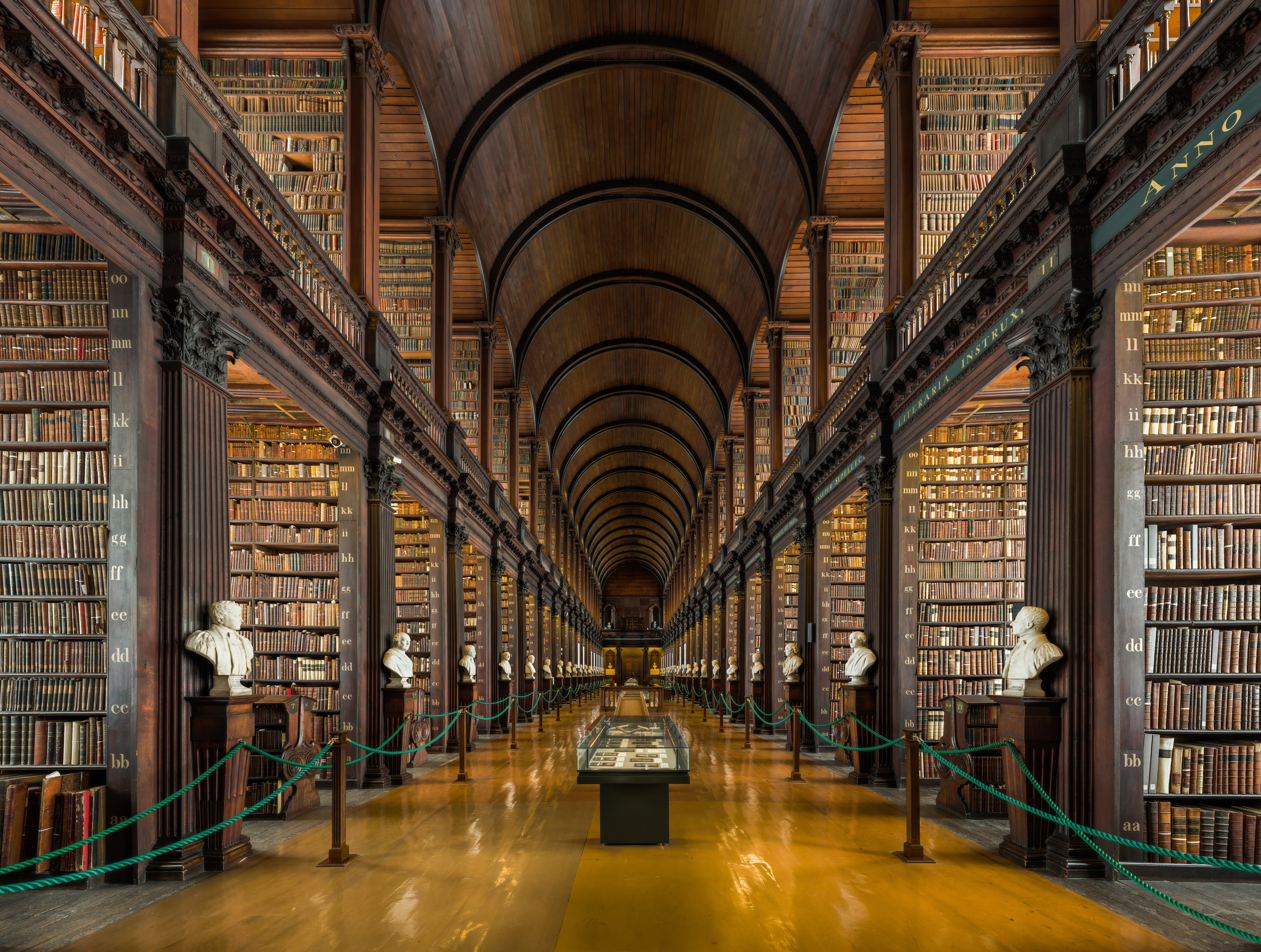
Trinity College Dublin

Elmes and her brother attended Rochelle School in Blackrock, Cork, a modern and well-equipped establishment. The school tried to keep any political turmoil out, with strict censorship - they did not, however, succeed, and Elmes, along with her peers, was exposed to the violence of the early 20th century from a young age. Elmes experienced the war first hand in May 1915 when the Cunard ocean liner 'The Lusitania' was torpedoed by a German u-boat off the coast of Cork. She and her family, along with thousands of others, rushed to Cobh to help the survivors. Elmes was also exposed to the violence of the War of Independence when the family business was burned out by British forces in 1920. Despite the turmoil, Elmes was encouraged by her family to travel and study. After her time in Rochelle, Elmes relocated to Meudon, Paris from December 1925 until January 1927. It was here she became fluent in French. When she returned to Cork, Elmes helped to raise funds for the Cork Child Welfare League with the Rochelle Old Girls' Association.

In 1928, Elmes enrolled at Trinity College Dublin, where she was elected a Scholar, and gained a First in Modern Literature (French and Spanish). In 1935, as a result of her academic achievements, Elmes was awarded a scholarship in International Studies to study at the London School of Economics. She received a certificate in International Studies, as well as a further scholarship to continue her education in Geneva, Switzerland.

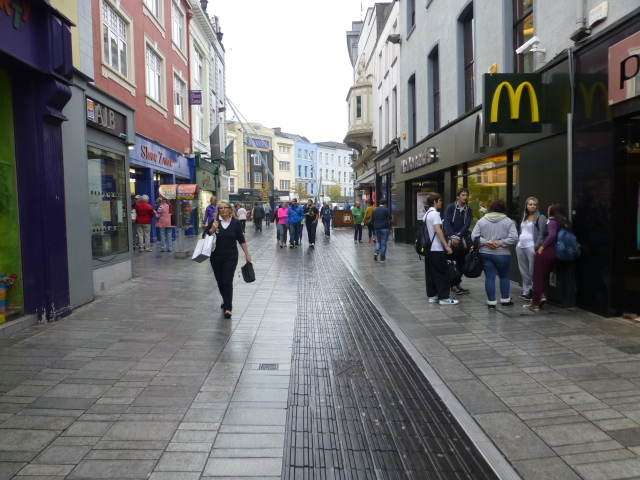
Winthrop Street in Cork's city centre. The pharmacy was located where McDonald's is shown (4 Winthrop Street)

=== Spanish Civil War ===
In February 1937, Elmes gave up her aspiring career in academia to volunteer and help refugees escaping the Spanish Civil War and after the completion of her studies, she joined the University of London Ambulance Unit and was sent to a children's hospital in Almeria, Spain, where she was assigned to a feeding station. Mary's father, Edward Elmes died at the end of 1937; however, Mary missed the funeral as she refused to abandon her post when no replacement could be found. Although she was not medically qualified, with her ability to speak Spanish and her drive and determination, she quickly proved her capabilities. She was appointed in January 1939 by the American Friends Service Committee (AFSC) (a Quaker humanitarian organisation) to run a hospital they were establishing in Alicante. Elmes was evacuated in May 1939 to the AFSC regional HQ in Perpignan, France. Here, Elmes helped set up workshops, canteens, schools and hospitals. It is estimated that Elmes along with her Quaker colleagues provided food to over 84,000 children in schools facing famine conditions in Southern France.

=== Saving Jewish children ===
The Nazis invaded France in 1940 and subsequently, Jews were targeted by the Gestapo and the Vichy regime's police. During this time, many Jews fled to the south of France. Elmes joined them and volunteered with the American Friends Service Committee, which cared for refugee children. In 1942, the Vichy authorities made it clear that Jewish children were not legally allowed to be exempt from being sent to the concentration camps, as they had been. Elmes, with help from some colleagues, rescued dozens of children, taking them to safe houses or helping them flee the country altogether. Jews in southwest France were rounded up to be deported from Rivesaltes camp, where Elmes spent most of her time. Rivesaltes was a permanent camp that was relatively new, and many Jews were taken from their homes by the Vichy government and sent there. The living conditions were inhumane; there were lice and rat infestations, and the camp consisted of huts and toilets. Malnutrition was a huge problem. The Quakers, along with other aid organisations, set up canteens and workshops in hopes of relieving some of the issues arising. Well aware that she was putting herself at risk, Elmes hid many children in the boot of her car and drove them to safe destinations, such as safe houses she had organised earlier in the war which were located in the foothills of the Pyrenees and along the coast. She aided many others by securing documents which allowed them to escape through the undercover network in Vichy France. She was not a Quaker herself, despite sometimes being described as the "head of the Quaker delegation at Perpignan," but worked with local Quaker organisations.

In January (or February) 1943, Elmes was arrested on suspicion of aiding the escape of Jews and was imprisoned in Toulouse, later being moved to Fresnes Prison run by the Gestapo near Paris, where she spent six months. Many years after her arrest, Elmes commented on her time in prison by saying "Oh, we all had to suffer some inconveniences in those days!". Mary's family hoped that after her ordeal she would leave France but she was determined not to abandon the refugees who still needed her help. Mary worked from her office in Perpignan until the war ended.

== Personal life ==
Elmes married Frenchman Roger Danjou in Perpignan, and had two children, Caroline and Patrick. After the war, she continued living in Pyrénées-Orientales (Northern Catalonia) where she had been active, first in Perpignan and then in Canet-en-Roussillon and Sainte-Marie-la-Mer. She died in a nursing home there at the age of 93.

Elmes did not speak much of the war or what she had done, and declined every award and distinction she was offered.

== Honours and legacy ==
After the war, Elmes was awarded the Legion of Honour (French:Légion d'honneur), the highest civilian award in France at the time, which she refused to accept on the grounds of unwanted attention for what she did. On 23 January 2013, 11 years after her death, having been nominated by one of the children she rescued, she was posthumously recognised by Yad Vashem as Righteous Among the Nations, her children and grandchildren receiving the award on her behalf, and on 30 September 2016, she was posthumously awarded the Trish Murphy Award at the Network Ireland Business Woman of the Year awards in Cork, which was accepted by her nephew, Mark Elmes, on behalf of her family. On 25 February 2019, it was announced by Cork City Council that a new pedestrian bridge linking Patrick's Quay to Merchant's Quay would be named after Mary Elmes. It was opened to the public on 9 July 2019.

The Mary Elmes Prize in Holocaust Studies is distributed by the Holocaust Educational Trust Ireland.

== See also ==
- Helga Holbek, Lois Gunden and Alice Resch, who, with Elmes, helped save Jewish and Spanish Civil War refugees, also earning the title Righteous Among the Nations
