= Donald A. Lowrie =

Donald Alexander Lowrie (January 29, 1889 – October 12, 1974) was an American humanitarian activist. He is best known for his work with the YMCA in France during World War II from 1940 to 1942. He helped anti-Nazi and Jewish refugees escape from Vichy France, which was dominated by Nazi Germany.

Author Susan Subak said of the rescue activities in France that "it is the small group of American Christians overseas -- the Unitarian Service Committee and their collaborators, Varian Fry and Donald Lowrie -- who risked their lives over many months living in hardship in Europe and who embodied rescue and flight." Lowrie had much more international experience than most American aid workers. He was effective skirting the boundaries of legality but maintaining good relations with the governments of Vichy France and the United States which accorded a low priority to the fate of the refugees, especially leftists. Focusing at first on aid to refugees interned in French camps, Lowrie turned his priority to Jewish children and coordinated a program to hide thousands of them in French homes, thereby saving them from deportation to Germany and death in concentration camps.

Prior to working in France, Lowrie had worked with the YMCA for more than twenty years in revolutionary Russia and the Soviet Union, and in Czechoslovakia. He created and led the Nimes Committee in France, an umbrella organization of 25 humanitarian organizations assisting anti-Nazi, Jewish, and other refugees. From a base in Switzerland after November 1942, Lowrie continued his work. After World War II, he worked in France until 1955 when he returned to the United States.

== Before World War II ==
Lowrie was born on January 29, 1889 in Medina, Ohio. His first overseas experience with the YMCA was helping refugees in Russia during and after World War I. Lowrie worked in Russia, Germany, and the Baltic states from 1916 until 1922, mostly helping prisoners of war. From 1922 to 1928 he served in Czechoslovakia and from 1928 to 1932 in Yugoslavia, working with students in both countries. He resigned from the YMCA in 1932 and took a job at the American House (a home for American students) at the Cîte University in Paris. In 1938, as World War II approached, he returned to the YMCA to aid German, Russian, Czech, and Bulgarian refugees in France. During his time in Russia, Lowrie had known Grigori Rasputin and Russian Orthodox Patriarch Tikhon of Moscow. In 1923, he wrote a book titled The Light of Russia which features an interview with Tikhon who died shortly thereafter. The Orthodox Church was oppressed by the Bolsheviks.

Lowrie married Helen Ogden (1887–1976) in 1925. Helen also worked for the YMCA in Russia from 1917-1923. Helen Lowrie was a force in her own right. During World War II, she was appointed as the representative of the Unitarian Service Committee in Marseille and worked on evacuating children, mostly Jewish, from France to the United States. She was proposed to replace Varian Fry when he was expelled from France in September 1941. She was described as "very outgoing, charming" and "did all the driving for Donald."

Donald Laurie was described by a colleague as a person "who worried a great deal." He had a "doctorate in the patience and persistence diplomacy needed to talk to Vichy officialdom. I think he ought to get some kind of honorary degree for knowing how to sneak up on French prefects...with problems of subsistence of his beleaguered people."

== France ==
In June 1940, the army of Nazi Germany defeated France. The northern and western one-half of France was occupied by Germany; the southeastern one-half, called Vichy France, remained nominally independent, but with the obligation to "surrender upon demand" all German citizens if requested by the German government. Tens of thousands of refugees from Nazi Germany, and many others from elsewhere, had fled to Vichy France, mostly ending up in Marseille or in one of the sordid refugee camps scattered around Vichy. The United States was still neutral in the war and maintained a diplomatic and commercial presence in Vichy France. Marseille was a bee-hive of refugees, British soldiers stranded after the Dunkirk evacuation, and humanitarian and relief organizations, including the American Friends Service Committee (Quakers), Unitarians, YMCA, Red Cross, and seven Jewish organizations, especially HICEM whose funding came mostly from American Jews. The Pat O'Leary Line in the city mostly helped British soldiers left behind after the Dunkirk evacuation escape to Spain.

In June 1940, the Lowries fled Paris ahead of the German arrival to halt in Pau near the border with Spain. In August 1940, the Lowries moved to the Terminus Hotel in Marseille and set up a YMCA office to work with refugees. Even as a seasoned Russian hand, Lowrie was shocked by the poor conditions in the refugee camps scattered around southern France.

Working with American Waitstill Sharp, Lowrie's initial efforts were to help in the escape from France of one thousand Czech soldiers enlisted in the French army but stranded as a result of the German victory. About 400 of them would eventually escape. He was selected as the delegate of the American Friends of Czechoslovakia. Lowrie obtained false passports from Czech diplomat Vladimír Vochoč for Czech soldiers plus Czech refugees, including many Jews, and along with Fry and Sharp smuggled them out of France into neutral Spain which accepted the passports as valid travel documents. In helping Czech soldiers escape, Lowrie played a double role as a YMCA representative and as an agent of the U.S. clandestine organization, the Office of Strategic Services (OSS), after its creation.

=== Nimes Committee ===
In November 1940, Lowrie created and chaired the "Coordination Committee for Relief Work in Internment Camps," called the Nimes Committee, a grouping of 25 humanitarian organizations working in France which coordinated the efforts to assist refugees with both aid and organizing their departure from France. Lowrie's experience and ability to speak several languages enabled him to be a source of information about Vichy and German intentions with regard to refugees, especially Jews. He shared his reports with other aid agencies and their U.S. headquarters. He warned in August 1942 that Jews were going to be deported from France to Germany to an unknown fate and that the only means of rescuing Jewish children would be to assist them to leave France.

Lowrie, as chairman of the Nimes Committee, negotiated with the Vichy French government including a meeting on August 6, 1942 with Marshall Petain, Prime Minister of Vichy France. Lowrie's objective in the meeting was to prevent the deportation to Germany of 10,000 foreign Jews from France to Germany. Lowrie pleaded for time to arrange for the United States to accept children. Lowrie was unsuccessful in halting the deportation, but was hopeful that the Petain government would allow Jewish children to be taken to the U.S. Jewish humanitarian organizations led a frantic effort to rescue Jewish children by placing them with French families.

Lowrie had, at this time, an inkling of what would happen to the deported Jews. He wrote in a report to YMCA leaders: "Since children, and aged and ill are taken and since their destination is uniformly reported as the Jewish reservation in Poland, the need for labor does not totally explain this action. In view of the present transport difficulties in Germany it is hard to understand a German desire to have these unfortunates...The best explanation we have been able to imagine is this: the general German plan for a new Europe includes 'purification' of undesirable elements."

In October 1942, the Nimes Committee got permission from President Roosevelt to admit five thousand Jewish children into the United States, but on November 11, 1942 the Germans occupied Vichy and the realization of those visas became impossible. What claim to independence that Vichy had ended with the German occupation. The Lowries were by chance in Switzerland at the time and did not return. The few Americans still in Vichy France were interned in Baden-Baden. Six thousand Jewish children were still in hiding in France and with little chance of getting to go to America.

== Switzerland ==
In neutral Switzerland, Lowrie attempted to persuade the Swiss government to accept 5,000 Jewish children. Lowrie never received a reply to his note on this subject to the Swiss Foreign Minister -- but commented that the Swiss never refused entry to a Jewish child who made it to their border. The focus of Lowrie and other refugee workers in Switzerland became to protect the 6,000 Jewish children hiding in France and to help those escape who had been interned. Jewish children hiding in France were usually housed with Christian families. The French-Jewish organization Œuvre de secours aux enfants (OSE) led the effort inside France to prevent the children's discovery and capture by the Germans. In August 1943, Lowrie's report passed to the U.S. government in Washington by the American Legation (Embassy) in Switzerland, described the persecution of Jews in France and said that money was needed to protect Jewish children hiding mostly in the Italian-controlled sector of France. The message resulted in the allocation of 100,000 dollars (1.8 million in 2024 dollars) by the American Joint Distribution Committee for the aid of French Jews and their helpers.

At the end of the war, Lowrie said, "All of us were surprised to discover than a third of our hidden youngsters could be reunited with their parents: the Christian organizations had done a larger job of hiding adults than most of us had realized."

== After the war ==
Near the end of World War II in 1944, Lowrie returned to France to focus on the problems of the many persons displaced during the war. From 1946 to 1952 he was Director of the YMCA press in Paris engaged in translating Russian books. In 1952, he retired from the YMCA and worked for UNICEF in Paris, returning to the U.S. in 1955. In 1963, Lowrie authored an account of his humanitarian work in Vichy France which was published by W.W. Norton and entitled The Hunted Children. He also wrote books titled The Light of Russia and Rebellious Prophet and translated several works from Russian into English.

He died on October 12, 1974 in Hightstown, New Jersey.

== Works ==
- Masaryk of Czecholovakia (1930)
