= Waitstill Sharp =

American Unitarian minister and humanitarian

Waitstill Hastings Sharp
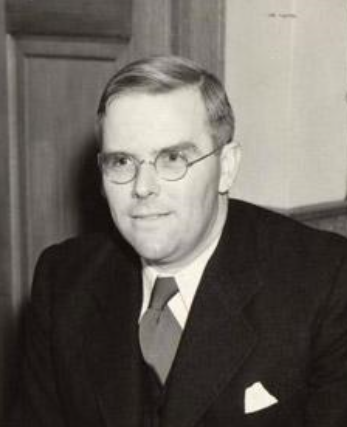
- Sharp in 1939
- Born: Waitstill Hastings Sharp; 1 May 1902; Boston, Massachusetts, US
- Died: 25 February 1983 (aged 80); Greenfield, Massachusetts, US
- Education: Boston University (B.A., 1924); Harvard Law (LL.B., 1926); Harvard University (M.A., 1931)
- Occupation: Unitarian minister
- Known for: humanitarian rescue work before and during World War II
- Spouses: Martha Sharp (m. 1927; div. 1954) Monica Allard Clark (m. 1955)
- Children: 2, including Martha Sharp Joukowsky

Waitstill Hastings Sharp (1 May 1902 – 25 February 1983) was an American Unitarian minister who was involved in humanitarian and relief work in Czechoslovakia and southern Europe in 1939 and 1940, just before and during World War II. With his wife, Martha, he provided relief aid to refugees, many of them Jewish, fleeing from Nazi Germany and countries under Nazi control and assisted people in danger of persecution to flee Czechoslovakia and France and resettle in the United States and elsewhere. In 2005, Waitstill and Martha were named by Yad Vashem as Righteous among the Nations, the second and third of five Americans to receive this honor.

== Early life ==
Sharp was born in Boston on May 1, 1902, son of Grace Hastings and naturalist, author and professor Dallas Lore Sharp. Sharp graduated from Boston University with an undergraduate degree in Economics and English in 1924, from Harvard Law School with an LL.B. in 1926, and with an M.A. from Harvard University in 1931.

On 13 June 1928, he married Martha Ingham Dickie in Rye, New Hampshire, the daughter of James Ingham and Alice Whalen, both immigrants from Britain who settled in Rhode Island. The ceremony was presided over by his father. A social worker involved with local internationalist and peace groups, Martha remained his ministry partner throughout his outreach and rescue work in Europe during the Second World War.

In his third year of law school, Sharp got to know Eugene Shippen, National Director of Religious Education for the American Unitarian Association (AUA), and minister of Second Church in Boston, and later became part-time director of religious education at Second Church. In 1933 he was ordained a Unitarian minister, and he became the pastor at a small church in Meadville, Pennsylvania. In April 1936, he was appointed pastor at the Unitarian Church of Wellesley Hills in Wellesley, Massachusetts.

== Czechoslovakia ==
The accession to power of Adolf Hitler and the Nazi party in Germany in 1933 led to the flight of refugees, mostly Social Democrats, communists and Jews, to Czechoslovakia. With the Munich Agreement (September 1938) which ceded to Germany the region of Czechoslovakia known as the Sudetenland, the flow of refugees increased. Kristalnacht, the anti-Jewish riots in Germany on 9-10 November 1938, further stimulated the flight of Jews.

In November 1938 the American Unitarian Association (AUA) sent its Director of Social Relations Robert Dexter to Czechoslovakia on a fact-finding mission. He was accompanied by Richard Wood, a Quaker. The Unitarian movement was strong in Czechoslovakia and the AUA had a close relationship with the prominent Masaryk family. Dexter and Wood found a dire situation in Czechoslovakia. There were more than 200,000 refugees in the country: Jews, communists, and anti-Nazi refugees from the Sudetenland, Austria, and Germany. They were in immediate need of material assistance and also needed to emigrate from Czechoslovakia to escape the danger of persecution due to the growing influence of Nazi Germany (which would occupy Czechoslovakia in March 1939).

The Unitarians gathered $41,000 for a mission but had trouble finding a representative willing to go to Czechoslovakia. Waitstill Sharp agreed after 17 candidates had turned down the job. Leaving their two young children behind in the United States, Waitstill and his wife Martha arrived in Prague on 23 February 1939. Initially the Sharps attempted to cooperate with the Czech government on rescue and relief projects for refugees, but the uncontested German invasion of Czechoslovakia on 15 March 1939 ended that effort. Afterwards, Waitstill focused on relief aid to refugees while his wife focused on securing emigration of refugees to other countries. Sharp augmented his budget by clever but sometimes illegal currency manipulations to supplement his resources. He dispensed funds to other organizations to feed refugees and also spent money to accumulate food, anticipating shortages in the near future.

Many refugee aid workers left Czechoslovakia shortly after the German take-over of 15 March 1939. The Sharps stayed and suffered, as did other foreigners in the country, from German harassment. On 13 April their office was searched and on 17 April the furniture in their office was thrown into the street. They changed locations but were closed down on 25 July. Waitstill left the country on 9 August; Martha a week later. On 30 August the couple boarded the RMS Queen Mary to return to the United States. World War II began on 1 September.

== Portugal, Spain, France ==
On 23 May 1940, less than nine months after the Sharps' return to the United States, Unitarian President Frederick May Eliot summoned Sharp to his office and persuaded him to return to Europe. His wife, Martha, was reluctant to leave their children again but decided to go with him. The Unitarians gave the Sharps about 10,000 dollars to spend at their discretion. They arrived in Lisbon, Portugal on 20 June and from there journeyed onward through Spain to France. France surrendered to Nazi Germany on 22 June, but southern France was allowed to have a semi-independent government, called Vichy France. Portugal and Spain were neutral in the conflict, as was the United States at that time.

Martha decided that her part of the project was to import dried milk into southern France to help with a problem of malnutrition in French children, but on their arrival in France about 19 July, they received a shock. Waitstill's old friend, Unitarian official Robert Dexter (who had persuaded the Sharps to go to Czechoslovakia) notified him and other relief organizations in France that he opposed the milk plan and all other relief expenditures in Vichy France. Because of German influence, Dexter believed that humanitarian aid to French children would help the Germans. The Sharps continued with their plan, but the estrangement between Waitstill and Dexter was permanent.

Martha focused on the difficult task of importing 12 tons of condensed and dried milk into France while Waitstill worked with Donald A. Lowrie, Varian Fry and others helping vulnerable refugees escape Vichy France. Waitstill spent three days in Marseille orienting the inexperienced Fry on the techniques of the semi-clandestine life. Fry was in France to rescue intellectuals and artists, many of them Jews, fleeing the Nazis. In mid-September 1940, the two of them organized the escape of several prominent intellectuals and their wives: Heinrich and Golo Mann, Franz Werfel, and Lion Feuchtwanger. The refugees walked across the Pyrenees into Spain escorted by an American named Leon (Dick) Ball. (Ball later disappeared, fate unknown). Waitstill accompanied Feuchtwanger to the United States, arriving in New York City on 5 October. Martha did not make it back to the U.S. until 23 December 1940. She had collected 27 refugee children and 10 adults and brought them to the U.S. with her.

Hearkening back to his Czechoslovak experience, Waitstill, during his time in France, had taken up the plight of about 1,000 Czech soldiers and their families stranded and interned at Agde, a French seaport. His plan to get all of them out on a merchant ship failed because of tightening immigration controls by the Vichy government, but about 400 of the soldiers later escaped by boat to Spain. The Sharps were replaced as Unitarian representatives in Lisbon by Charles R. Joy.

== Personal life ==
Waitstill returned to Boston, disillusioned about the state of the world and apparently wishing to become only a Unitarian clergyman again, although he was a popular speaker and accepted jobs to work in Europe and Cairo after his resignation from his parish in 1944. He later became pastor of several different churches, including the ministry of a church in Davenport, Iowa. The couple, oft separated during and after the war, divorced in 1954. Waitstill remarried on June 24, 1957, in Chicago, Illinois to Monica Adlard Clark. His last ministry was in Petersham, Massachusetts from 1967 to 1972. He retired in 1972 and lived in Greenfield, Massachusetts thereafter, dying on February 25, 1983. His second wife, Monica, born in Saskatchewan, died on 12 November 2007 in Pacific Palisades, California, age 98.

Waitstill and Martha Sharp had two children, Waitstill Hastings Jr., born in November 1931, and Martha Sharp Joukowsky, born in September 1936.

== Legacy ==
Like many of the people engaged in similar activities in the lead-up and during World War II, Waitstill Sharp never talked much about his experiences in Europe. His grandson, Artemis Joukowsky III, of Sherborn, Massachusetts, began collecting information about his grandparents in 1976 and persuaded Ken Burns to make a documentary film about them. The film, Defying the Nazis: The Sharps' War, recounting the experiences of the Sharps was co-directed by Burns and Joukowsky.

An educational curriculum including the Sharps is featured at the United States Holocaust Memorial Museum.

== Honours and decorations ==
=== Yad Vashem ===
On 9 September 2005, Martha and Waitstill Sharp were named by Yad Vashem as Righteous among the Nations, the second and third Americans to receive this honor (the first being Varian Fry).

=== Decorations ===
- Czechoslovakia: Officer of the Order of the White Lion (1946)

== See also ==
- British Committee for Refugees from Czechoslovakia
