= Hermsen =

Hermsen is a Dutch patronymic surname meaning "son of Herm" (a short form of Herman). Notable people with the surname include:

- André Hermsen (born 1942), Dutch water polo player, brother of Henk and Wim
- Elisabeth Hermsen (1895–1980), Dutch nurse and resistance fighter
- Henk Hermsen (1937–2022), Dutch water polo player, brother of André and Wim
- Jim Hermsen (born 1982), Dutch hardcore techno musician known as "Tha Playah"
- Kleggie Hermsen (1923–1994), American basketball player
- Toine Hermsen (born 1954), Dutch chef and restaurant owner
- Wim Hermsen (born 1947), Dutch water polo player and astronomer, brother of André and Henk

== See also ==
- Harmsen
