= Maria Theresia (Rie) Mair =

Dutch war resister (born 1896)

Rie Polak-Mair (born 1896) was a Dutch war resister who was born Maria Theresia (Rie) Mair who suffered imprisonment in several concentration camps but survived the Holocaust. Near the end of her time at a subcamp of the Dachau concentration camp, she wrote a detailed letter to her children describing her life there, speculating on the fate of their father, telling of her last escape from the prison and relating news of the camp's liberation by American forces.

== Biography ==
Maria Theresia Mair was born in Rotterdam, Netherlands, on 15 September 1896. She met her Jewish future husband, Zeno Paul Polak, on a ship traveling to the East Indies, where he worked for a petroleum company. On 30 January 1922, in Sukabumi, West Java, the couple married and she took the surname Polak-Mair. They went on to have three children, Els (Else; in Balikpapan, 29 November 1922), Paul (in Balikpapan, 26 February 1924), and Hettie (in Hilversum, 21 August 1930). In 1942, with the start of World War II and increasing threats against Jews, the couple formally separated to keep Polak-Mair safe, but the effort wasn't successful.

=== Arrest ===
In early 1943, she went into hiding with six Jews in a nursing home owned by Elisabeth Hermsen who, like Polak-Mair, was not a Jew. On 16 February 1944, a Jewish man arrested in Amsterdam by Nazi captors revealed the names and hiding places of family members, including the address of the nursing home. On 24 February, the police raided the home and arrested Polak-Mair, Hermsen and the six Jewish women. All were sent to a temporary holding area at the Oranjehotel in Scheveningen. From there, the six women were deported via Westerbork transit camp to Auschwitz concentration camp in Poland, where they died in the gas chambers.

Polak-Mair and Hermsen were sent to Camp Vught and put to work in the factory of the Philips Commando subcamp. In September 1944, they were deported to Ravensbrück concentration camp in Germany. A month later, they were selected for the Agfa Commando, an external subcamp of the Dachau concentration camp in Munich-Giesing, Germany, where women prisoners became slave laborers for the Agfa imaging factory assembling "time fuses for anti-aircraft grenades and ... parts for the V1 and V2 'vengeance weapons' on behalf of the AGFA factory." While doing so they were able to sabotage some of their work, thus continuing to contribute to the war effort from prison.

=== The letter ===
As the War neared its conclusion, Polak-Mair began writing a detailed letter to her children and described the sounds coming from the Allied front. Afraid that she would not survive the next few days, she began her letter as a farewell, but when the Americans liberated Dachau, the letter's tone changed to a more optimistic one, telling her children that "they had had a truly exceptional father." In it, she described, "how the Americans arrived at their [sub]camp and also entered the main Dachau camp, where the situation was so dire that they summarily hanged the commandant." The letter, never sent, remains a "moving" account of life and survival at the end of World War II.

After liberation, Polak-Mair found herself in Munich, watching the arrival of American troops. She returned to the Netherlands but her husband did not, having died on 26 February 1945, just a month after his liberation from Auschwitz.
