= Ada van Keulen =

Dutch World War II resistance member

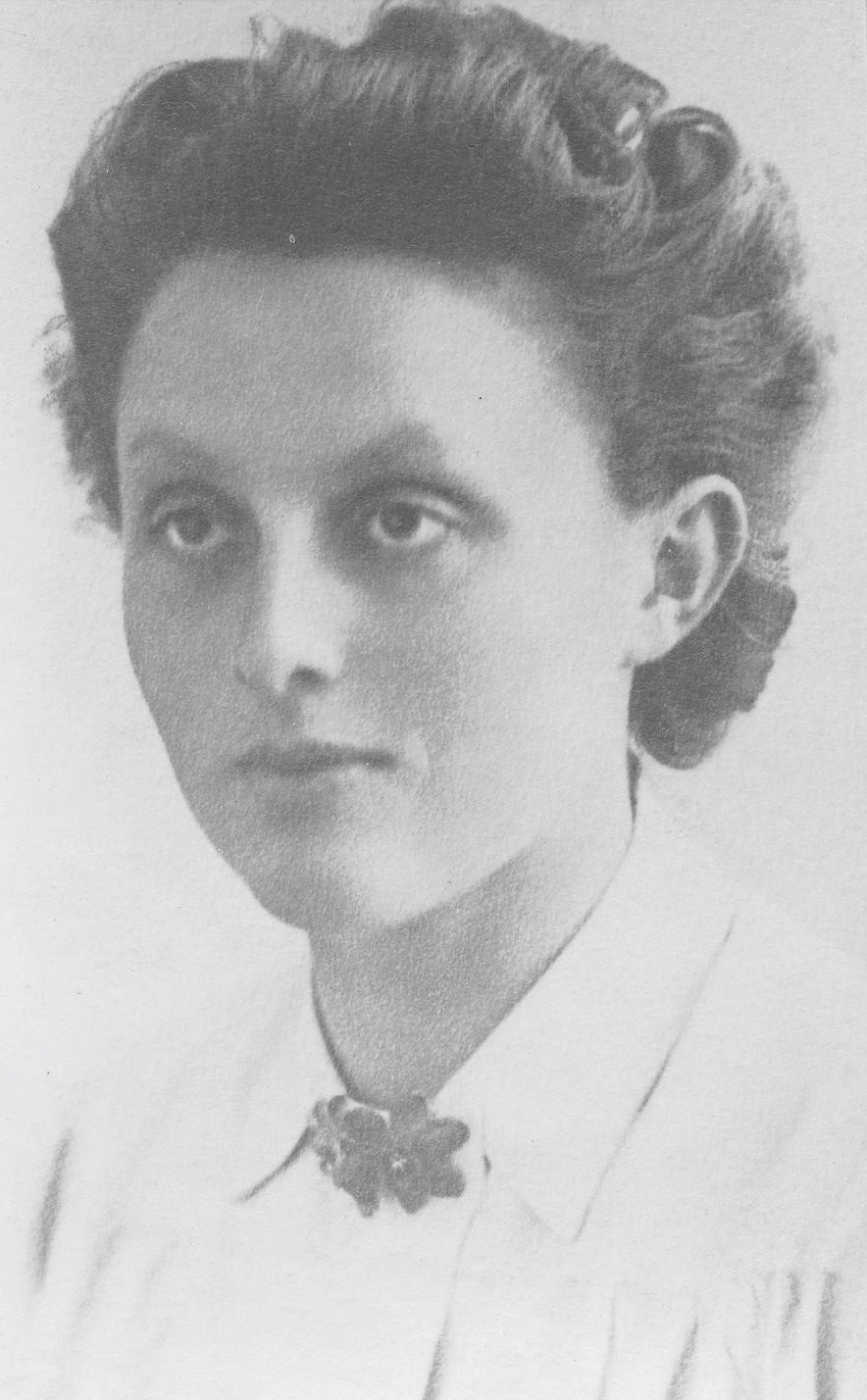
- Ada van Keulen
- Born: January 13, 1920; Aalsmeer, Netherlands
- Died: December 25, 2010 (aged 90); Laren, North Holland, Netherlands
- Known for: Member of the Dutch resistance

Aleida Mathilde (Ada) van Keulen (13 January 1920, in Aalsmeer – 25 January 2010, in Laren, North Holland) was a Dutch woman who took part in the resistance during World War II.

Van Keulen headed a boy scout group in Hilversum, the Heidepark Group, which became illegal during the war and carried out work for the resistance. She was also a courier for Hessels en Van Wilgenburg. On June 13, 1944, she was betrayed and arrested together with 27 other resistance fighters in Amsterdam. Among others, they included Jo Hessels, Hendrik van Wilgenburg, and Joukje Grandia-Smits, all of whom were imprisoned. Of the 27, only seven survived the war.

She was sent to Vught concentration camp and in September 1944 deported to Ravensbrück. In October, she was transferred to Dachau, where she was employed in the Agfa-Commando.

On April 30, 1945, van Keulen was freed by the Americans during the Wolfratshausen evacuation march.
