= Elisabeth Hermsen =

Dutch nurse and resistance fighter (1895–1980)

Elisabeth Jacoba (Liesbeth) Hermsen (16 April 1895 – 8 December 1980) was a Dutch nurse and resistance fighter during World War II who hid Jewish people and suffered imprisonment in the Dachau concentration camp but survived. She was posthumously awarded the Righteous Among the Nations distinction by Yad Vashem.

== Biography ==
Liesbeth Hermsen was born in Muiden, Netherlands, the youngest of ten children. Her mother died when she was five years old. Her father remarried and had another child with his second wife, but he died a year later. At first, Liesbeth was moved to a children's home and later she lived with a family in Hilversum. In 1913, at 18, she moved to The Hague and trained as a nurse before opening a retirement home in Duinoord.

=== Resistance work ===
During the Second World War, she joined the Scheveningen branch of the National Organization for Assistance to People in Hiding. She worked as a courier and took people into her home who were sought by German occupiers. In early 1943, she hid six Jewish people in her nursing home as well as one patient Maria Theresia (Rie) Mair who, like Hermsen, was not Jewish.

On 16 February 1944, a Jewish man was arrested in Amsterdam. During his interrogation by German captors, he revealed the names of family members and hiding places, including the address of the six Jewish women. On 24 February, the police raided Hermsen's nursing home and arrested her, Rie Polak-Mair, and the six Jewish women. They were all transferred to the Oranjehotel in Scheveningen. From there, the Jewish women were deported via Westerbork transit camp to Auschwitz concentration camp in Poland and gassed to death.

Hermsen and Rie Polak-Mair were sent to Camp Vught and put to work in the Philips Commando. In September 1944, they were deported to Ravensbrück concentration camp in Germany. A month later, they were selected for the Agfa Commando, an external subcamp of the Dachau concentration camp in Munich-Giesing, Germany, where prisoners worked as slaves for the Agfa camera factory making munitions for the German forces.

In late 1944, tuberculosis broke out in the Agfa Commando, causing the German forces to build a small women's hospital. In February 1945, Hermsen was transferred to the base camp and became head of the women's hospital, even though she was also ill. When Dachau was evacuated because of advancing Allied troops in April 1945, most of the prisoners were sent on a death march, but about ten sick Dutch women from the Agfa Commando remained behind in the base camp. There they were cared for by Hermsen and Jo Goos until American troops reached and liberated Dachau on 29 April 1945. However, because Hermsen was suffering from typhus, she could not be repatriated immediately and remained in Dachau until 27 May 1945. After returning to the Netherlands, she was nursed for several months in a repatriation hospital.

=== Last years ===
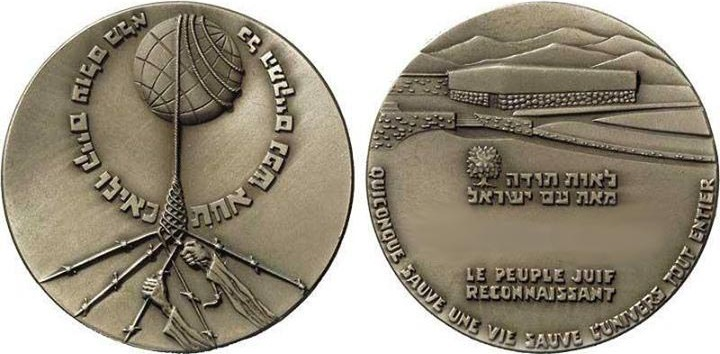
Medal of Righteous Among the Nations

After the war, Hermsen returned to the nursing profession even as her health problems continued. In the 1970s, she began piano lessons from the composer Marjo Tal, a Jewish resistance fighter who had also survived the Holocaust.

Liesbeth Hermsen died on 8 December 1980.

== Award ==
- Liesbeth Hermsen posthumously received the Righteous Among the Nations distinction from Yad Vashem in 2018.
