= International School Hilversum =

- International School Hilversum "Alberdingk Thijm"
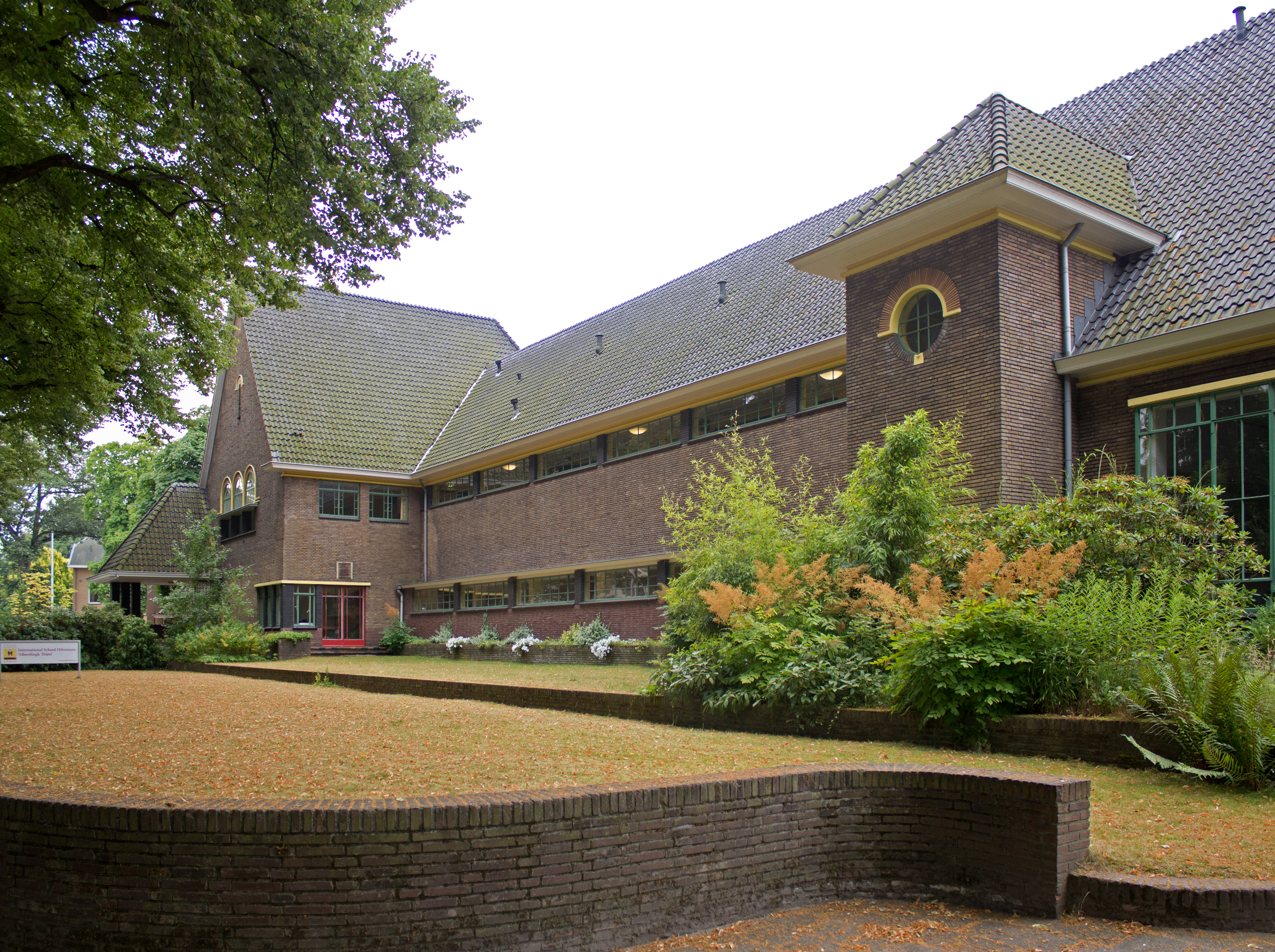
- Hilversum; Netherlands

Information
- School type: Dutch International School (Semi-public)
- School board: Alberdingk Thijm Scholen
- Authority: Stichting Dutch International Schools (DIS)
- Enrollment: ~820
- Website: www.ishilversum.nl

The International School Hilversum (ISH) is an international school located in Hilversum, the Netherlands. It is a member of the Alberdingk Thijm Scholen foundation, a Catholic educational board that oversees primary and secondary schools in the Gooi region. The school offers the International Baccalaureate (IB) curriculum to students aged 4 to 19.

== History ==
The school is a registered IB World School and was one of the earliest schools in the Netherlands to receive authorisation from the International Baccalaureate Organization. It was authorized to teach the IB Diploma Programme (DP) on 1 November 1982. Later, the school received authorization to teach the IB Middle Years Programme (MYP) in March 1994 and the IB Primary Years Programme (PYP) in December 2008.

As a Dutch International School (DIS), the school is partially funded by the Dutch Government, operating within the Dutch education system while delivering an international curriculum.

== Curriculum ==
International School Hilversum provides the full International Baccalaureate continuum:

- IB Primary Years Programme (PYP): Offered to pupils aged 4 to 11 (Kindergarten to Grade 5).
- IB Middle Years Programme (MYP): Designed for students aged 11 to 16 (Grades 6 to 10).
- IB Diploma Programme (DP): A pre-university course for students aged 16 to 19 (Grades 11 and 12).

In addition to the core IB curriculum, the school offers language acquisition courses in Dutch, French, and Spanish, as well as an "English as an Additional Language" (EAL) programme for students requiring support. The school also includes a bilingual stream known as Internationaal Tweetalig VWO (TTO), which integrates the Dutch VWO curriculum with English-language instruction.

== Student body ==
As of 2024, the school has a population of roughly 820 students, consisting of around 85 students in the primary sector (PYP) and 735 in the secondary sector (MYP & DP). The student body comprises over 50 nationalities. The largest national groups are Dutch, British, Indian, and American students.

== Campus and facilities ==
The school maintains one main campus located at Emmastraat 56 in Hilversum. The main building, originally built in 1937, was designed by architect Nic. Andriessen and holds the status of a nationally protected heritage building (Rijksmonument).

The campus includes various facilities such as two indoor gymnasiums, an outdoor multipurpose court, and science laboratories. Technology is integrated into the students' teaching; secondary students utilize personal MacBooks, while primary students have access to either a MacBook and/or iPad.

== Extracurricular activities ==
The school offers various extracurricular activities and student-led clubs. These include a Sustainability Committee, which led the school to join the Eco-Schools programme, and the "Rainbow Alliance".

Students also produce a newspaper titled the Alberdingk Times. The school has a debate team that participates in Model United Nations (MUN) conferences; in 2022, the school was named the "Best School" at the Lorentz Model United Nations Arnhem (LmunA) conference.
