= Hendrika Gerritsen =

Dutch resistance fighter

- Born: Hendrika Jacoba Heinsius; 12 April 1921; Amsterdam, Netherlands
- Died: 27 December 1990 (aged 69); Amsterdam, Netherlands
- Other name: Kiky Gerritsen-Heinsius
- Occupation: Dutch Resistance Fighter
- Title: Righteous Among the Nations
- Spouse: Piet Gerritsen

Hendrika Jacoba "Kiky" Gerritsen-Heinsius (12 April 1921 – 27 December 1990) was a Dutch resistance fighter. She was recognized by Yad Vashem as Righteous Among the Nations on 15 September 1989, and was also awarded the Verzetsherdenkingskruis (Resistance Memorial Cross) by the Dutch government.

A member of the Dutch Resistance who actively helped Dutch men and women escape Nazi persecution, she survived imprisonment at three Nazi concentration camps – Herzogenbusch (Vught) in the Netherlands and Ravensbrück and Dachau in Germany, as well as the harsh working conditions of the Munich-Giesing satellite camp known as Agfa-Commando, becoming one of those liberated from Dachau at the end of April, 1945.

She was known to family and friends as "Kiky".

== Formative years ==
Born in Amsterdam, Netherlands on 12 April 1921, her birth name was Hendrika Jacoba Heinsius. Following her marriage to Piet Gerritsen, she became Hendrika Jacoba Gerritsen-Heinsius.

== World War II ==
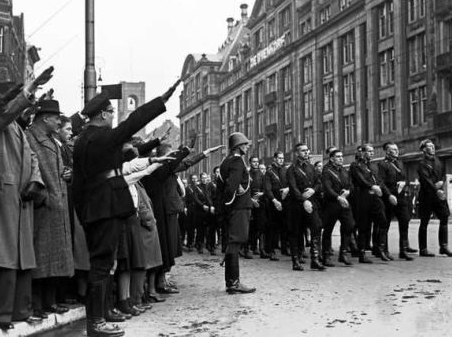
Nazi troops in front of the De Bijenkorf department store, Dam Square, Amsterdam, Netherlands (c. 1941).

Residing alone in Amsterdam and employed at that city's famed department store, De Bijenkorf, during the opening years of World War II, Kiky Heinsius was intimately acquainted with the dangers faced by Jewish men, women and children. Within the span of just a few months, two of her friends were targeted by Nazi officials in the Netherlands. Following the June 1941 death of her closest friend, Rudolph Richter, at the Mauthausen concentration camp, her movements were monitored after she tried to intervene on behalf of another friend, Leo Zwart, who had been arrested, interrogated and deported to Westerbork.

Despite the threat to her personal security, she then actively intervened on behalf of a third individual, Siegfried Goldsteen, a Jewish labor camp fugitive who had been befriended by her co-worker, Anna Maass. Hiding him at her home in early 1943, according to Yad Vashem, Kiky Heinsius "stole ration cards from her employer to provide for him" before helping him locate and move to "a safer hideout." She then also relocated, moving "to a larger apartment with a hiding place ... took in Judith Fransman, an acquaintance of Sieg’s," and persuaded another friend to help secure extra ration cards.

Approached by members of the Amsterdam Resistance, she was soon making frequent trips "to Drenthe to pick up forged papers for people in hiding" while helping to transport others to more secure locations.

When her apartment was raided on 2 February 1944, both she and Goldsteen were captured. According to Yad Vashem, "Sieg perished somewhere in Central Europe in June 1944" while Kiky was sent to Vught (Herzogenbusch), Ravensbrück, and a subcamp of Dachau, from where she was liberated on 30 April 1945." The Verzetsmuseum in Amsterdam places the date of her arrival at Dachau as 15 October 1944 while a list of prisoners being transported to that camp in 1944 noted that her inmate number there would be "123202."

Records preserved from the concentration camp at Dachau also provide further confirmation of many of her vital statistics, including that her name was "Hendrika Heinsius", that her inmate number was "123202," that she had been born in Amsterdam on 12 April 1921, and that she had been sent from Ravensbrück to Dachau; however, these records also state that she did not arrive at Dachau until 12 November 1944. In addition, the Dachau records confirm that she had been designated by Nazi officials as a "Schutzhäftling" from the Netherlands. Translated roughly as "protective custody prisoner," the term "Schutzhäftling" was a euphemism used by Nazis to describe political prisoners or others they deemed to be threats to the Third Reich or otherwise undesirable, many of whom were detained without trial. Having survived imprisonment at both Ravensbrück and Dachau, according to Dachau's records, she was finally liberated from that camp with her fellow prisoners on 30 April 1945.

=== Prison life at Agfa-Commando ===
According to Jack van Ommen, author of The Mastmakers' Daughters, his mother, Rennie van Ommen-de Vries, and Hendrika Gerritsen were two of the women who performed forced labor at Agfa-Commando, which was a satellite camp of Dachau, located at Munich-Giesing roughly 14 miles from the Dachau main camp. Both women had been members of the Dutch Resistance, and had also been imprisoned at the Nazi's Herzogenbusch (Vught) and Ravensbrück concentration camps prior to their 15 October 1944 transfer to Agfa with a group of former Resistance members and other Dutch women.

Beginning each day with a prisoner count at 5:00 in the morning, they were marched to the plant, which was part of the vast network of factories operated by IG Farben. Ordered to assemble ignition timers for Nazi weapons, including artillery ammunition, bombs, and V1 and V2 rockets, they sabotaged production efforts whenever possible. At the end of each work day at 6:00 p.m., they were marched back to Munich-Giesing, where they slept six or seven to a room in a bombed-out apartment block. Surrounded by a high barbed wire fence, the substandard housing was monitored by guards in watch towers at each of the block's four corners.

=== Prisoners' strike at Agfa-Commando ===
The prisoners at Dachau and its subcamps were often at risk from Allied bombing, which targeted factories and railroads in and around Munich more than 70 times over a five-year period in order to destroy or at least disrupt and delay armament production. Despite the danger, the prisoners at these facilities "were not permitted to seek shelter in bunkers", according to the Bavarian House of History; as a result, many "lived in constant fear of air raids."

Consequently, van Ommen writes, the 14-mile road between Dachau and Agfa was impassable by January 1945, preventing food and other supplies from being delivered. As salt and other staples ran out, the factory's managers began watering down prisoners' soup rations "while at the same time trying to raise the production quotas." Many women, malnourished and overworked, fell ill with typhoid fever, tuberculosis and other diseases, but fought to remain at Agfa as long as possible since being sent to the overcrowded hospital at Dachau would likely result in their deaths.

It was at this point, says the Bavarian House of History, that "the Dutch prisoners stopped working, even though this was regarded as sabotage and was punished by death." Hendrika Gerritsen, when penning her memoir later in life, observed:

What finally gave the decisive effect on 12 January 1945, I do not really remember. ... shortly after the lunch break the work was suddenly put down in front of the hall. 'No, we do not want to work any more, we are hungry.'

Ella Lingens, one of the women who was later held "partially responsible for the strike," stated that the prisoner revolt started when one woman "turned off the conveyor belt and ... crossed [her] arms and when the commandant, completely enraged ... asked why she wasn't working" was told "because we don't want to anymore."

Afterward, Mary Vaders, one of the Dutch prisoners, was fingered as the instigator by one of the other nationals in the camp and sent to the Bunker in the Dachau concentration camp but, due to fortunate circumstances, the threatened execution was never carried out. According to van Ommen, the other strike participants "were punished with hours standing in formation in the court yard" at Agfa. Three months later, the factory was shut down.

Hendrika Gerritsen's recollections about her time at Agfa-Commando and other Nazi concentration camps continue to be shared through special events across the Netherlands and Germany, including readings of her unpublished memoir, The World Was White, and the 2017 exhibition of Alexander Steig's "Camera," a sculpture "dedicated to the memory of the approximately 550 forced laborers of the Giesinger satellite camp Agfa-Kamerawerke.

== Death ==
Following a brief illness, Hendrika "Kiky" Gerritsen-Heinsius died in Amsterdam on 27 December 1990. Members of the community were given the opportunity to bid farewell to her at the Osdorp event center in Amsterdam on 31 December 1990 and 2 January 1991. Her cremation ceremony was then held later in the day on 2 January at the Crematorium Westgaarde in Amsterdam's Memorial Park Westgaarde.

== Awards ==
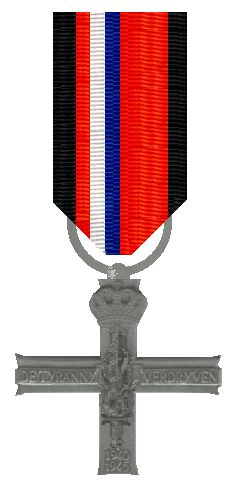
Verzetsherdenkingskruis (Resistance Memorial Cross)

Hendrika Gerritsen was honored nationally and internationally for her work with the Dutch Resistance during World War II. On 15 September 1989, she was awarded the title of Righteous Among the Nations by Yad Vashem, and her name was inscribed on the far right panel of the Netherlands Wall, 13th name from the bottom, in the Garden of the Righteous Among the Nations, which is located on the Mount of Remembrance in Jerusalem, Israel.

The organization's website explains the significance of the honor as follows:

Rescue of Jews took many forms and required varying degrees of involvement and self-sacrifice. The title of the Righteous is reserved for the smaller group of those who actively risked their lives or their liberty for the express purpose of saving Jews from persecution and murder. There is a wider circle of men and women who assisted the persecuted in the darkest hour of Jewish history, but whose help did not involve the taking of risks. These humane people have our greatest appreciation and their deeds are being documented by us. Nevertheless, even though their aid was crucial to the Jews' survival, in the absence of risk, they do not qualify for recognition within the framework of the Righteous program.

Hendrika Gerritsen was also awarded the Verzetsherdenkingskruis (Resistance Memorial Cross) by the Dutch government. According to Erik Müller, who has been researching and writing about Dutch medals for the Orders and Medals Research Society, "the cross was awarded to members of the Dutch Underground Movement for active resistance to the enemy," and is inscribed with the words, "De Tyrannie Verdryven" ("To get rid of tyranny").

The photograph (at right in this section) is a general image, provided here to illustrate what Gerritsen's Resistance Memorial Cross would have looked like.

== External resources ==
- Database of Righteous Among the Nations (online). Jerusalem: Yad Vashem.
- Lagrou, Peter. The legacy of Nazi occupation: patriotic memory and national recovery in Western Europe, 1945-1965, pp. 74–77. Cambridge: Cambridge University Press, 2000 ISBN 0-521-65180-8.
- Liberation of Dachau. Washington, D.C.: United States Holocaust Memorial Museum.
- Morse, Steve and Peter Landé. Dachau Concentration Camp Records (online database).
- Righteous Among the Nations (explanation of the honor and criteria for consideration). Jerusalem: Yad Vashem.
- van Ommen, Jan. Het Agfa Kommando (The Agfa Commando). Reinbek near Hamburg, retrieved 6 April 2018.
