= Simone Guillissen =

Belgian architect (1916-1996)

- Born: 7 March 1916; Peking
- Died: 30 May 1996 (aged 80); Brussels
- Occupation: Architect

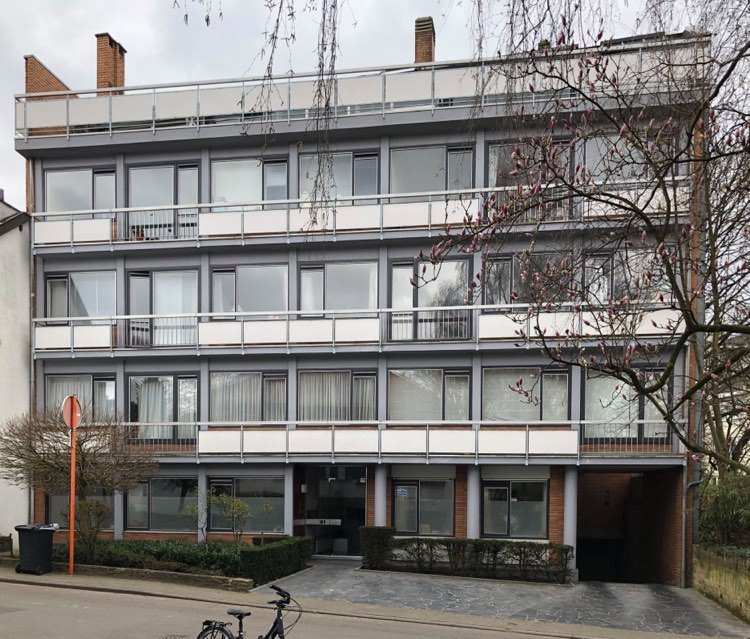
Office and studio of Simone Guillissen-Hoa, rue Langeveld

Simone Guillissen-Hoa (7 March 1916, Peking – 30 May 1996, Brussels) was a Belgian architect. She was one of the first women architects in Belgium and the first one to build a house. After World War II, she contributed to the renewal of residential complexes. To do so, she designed several modernist houses that corresponded to the local style, in terms of the use of materials for example.

== Biography ==
She was born in Beijing. Her father was a Chinese engineer and her mother a Polish-Jewish writer. Her brother, Leon Hoa, also studied architecture and practiced in France and China. After her studies in Brussels, at the Henriette Dachsbeck high school, she joined La Cambre to study architecture and graduated in 1938. She was the fourth woman to graduate from the school in this field. Shortly thereafter, she began an internship with Charles Van Nueten, her teacher at La Cambre, but finished it in Zurich with Alfred Roth. In 1937, she married Jean Guillissen. Although she left him before the war, she continued to use his name. During World War II, as a member of the resistance, he was shot, while she was deported to the Ravensbrück concentration camp and later to the agfa commando, a satellite of the Dachau concentration camp.

== Career ==
=== Architectural practice ===
In 1947, she took over her activity by participating in reconstruction programs. For a few years, she worked in partnership with Jacques Dupuis (1952–1956). In 1957, she achieved one of her most remarkable projects, La Quinta, a large villa in La Roche that she designed with distinct functional zones. In 1947 she received an important commission for the sports center in Jambes, but it was not completed until the early 1960s. She also designed a provincial institute for blind people in 1953. In the early 1970s, she participated in the development of Louvain-la-Neuve by designing a student residence. In 1980, she completed the construction of the Maison de la Culture in Tournai in collaboration with Ginion, Pirson and Winance.

=== Other professional activities ===
In addition to her personal achievements, Simone Guillissen-Hoa also worked as a consulting architect for the French Ministries of Public Health (1946–47) and the Ministry of Culture (1967–68). Later she was a member of the S.C.A.B and of UfvAB - the Union of Women Architects of Belgium, founded in 1978 by the architect and activist Dita Roque-Gourary (1915-2010), also a graduate of La Cambre.

She was also a member of juries: at the Saint-Luc school in Liège, at the F.A.B. inter-school competition and for the Van de Ven competition in 1964, one year after having obtained the first mention.

== Achievements ==
Simone Guillissen-Hoa is at the origin of a great number of houses and various buildings, mainly in Belgium and Brussels, and mostly built between 1942 and 1980. Her most published achievements date from her collaboration with Jacques Dupuis. But her work extends well beyond these 4 years. The list below includes new buildings but she also contributed to renovations and transformations of existing projects.

- 1947 : Villa, 92 avenue Lancaster in Uccle.
- 1948 : Jambes Sports Center, Sports Park and Ball Stands.
- 1949 : Double house, 22 avenue Bel-Air in Uccle.
- 1950 : Building, 6 avenue Bel-Air in Uccle.
- 1950 : House, 77 avenue des Chênes in Uccle.
- 1950 : Villa, 57 avenue Alphonse XIII in Uccle.
- 1954 : Villa, 282 chaussée de Malines in Wezembeek.
- 1954 : Grandstands of the sports center of Jambes.
- 1955 : Apartment building, 88 avenue Legrand in Ixelles.
- 1955 : Tenzer house, 69 avenue général Lotz in Uccle.
- 1955 : Villa, 13 avenue des Pavots in Kraainem.
- 1956 : House, 95 rue du Tomberg in Woluwe-Saint-Lambert.
- 1957 : Residence of Assche, 35 avenue des Lauriers in Woluwe-Saint-Pierre.
- 1960 : Villa "La Quinta" à la Roche Tangissart, 91 avenue des Cerisiers in Baisy-Thy.
- 1960 : House, 7 rue Marie Depage in Uccle.
- 1960 : Groupe of 2 houses, 120 route Gouvernementale in Kraainem.
- 1961 : Villa, 82 drève de la Fauvette in Linkebeek.
- 1963 : Apartment building, 21 rue Langeveld in Uccle.
- 1968 : Villa in Coq-sur-mer.
- 1971 : Group of 2 student housing buildings in Louvain-la-Neuve.
- 1980 : house of culture of Tournai.

In collaboration with Jacques Dupuis

- 1952 : Villa (now demolished), 29 avenue des Genêts in Rhode-Saint-Genèse.
- 1953 : City for old workers in Quaregnon.
- 1953 :Jewelry Degreef, 24-26 rue au Beurre in Uccle.
- 1953 : House Steenhout, 47 avenue Napoléon in Uccle - classified as a Brussels heritage site in 2011.
- 1954 : Nursery School in Frameries.
- 1954 : Center for the Blind and Amblyopic in Ghlin.

== Awards and distinctions ==
Simone Guillissen-Hoa received a real recognition from the critics and architects of her time. She is often the only woman mentioned in the collections of modern Belgian architecture and has won a number of awards and prizes for her works.

- 1939 : Awarded at the "Mobilier Type" competition in Zurich.
- 1942 : Awarded at the "Art et Industrie" competition.
- 1945 : Awarded at the Social Centre's Jette competition.
- 1954 : third mention ex-aequo at the prix Van de Ven.
- 1963 :First mention in the prix Van de Ven.
