= Harmke Pijpers =

Dutch journalist and presenter

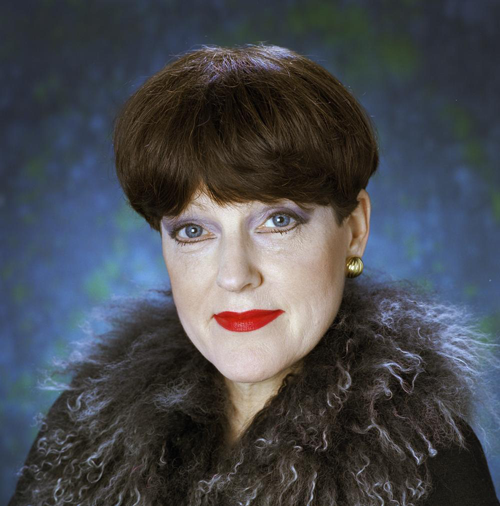
Harmke Pijpers

Harmke Pijpers (Hilversum, July 17, 1946) is a Dutch journalist, presenter and voiceover of different radio- and television programs. She is currently presenter at BNR Nieuwsradio. In 2010 she received the RadioBitches Oeuvre Award.

== Career Start ==
Harmke Pijpers began her broadcasting career as "secretary with ambition" at the VARA but she became known for the VPRO radio program The Building.

By combining programs Radio 1 she came to visit the Radio 1 News. In 2000 she moved to the AVRO where she both on radio and television presented the art program opium.

== Work for commercial broadcasters ==
In late 2005 she was a presenter on the new television channel Talpa where in addition to Beau van Erven Dorens she presented the news and show program NSE. This job she took first in alternation with Inge Ipenburg but later with Evert Santegoeds. When the format was changed from NSE to NSE NEWS and it was more focused on news and less on sports and entertainment, her role as presenter was no longer needed. She had a stint as a reporter for News at NSE, but after the program was abandoned from the television channel of De Mol she did not come back on television.

Since September 2007 Pijpers has presented De Frontlinie on BNR Nieuwsradio
