= Van Kooten =

van Kooten is a surname of Dutch origin. People with the name include:

- Cees van Kooten (1948–2015), Dutch professional football player and manager
- Kees van Kooten (born 1941), Dutch comedian, television actor, and author
  - Half of the comedy duo of Van Kooten en De Bie
- Kim van Kooten (born 1974), Dutch actress and screenwriter
- Theodorus van Kooten (1749–1813), Dutch poet, professor and politician
- Willem van Kooten (1941–2025), Dutch entrepreneur and DJ
