= Wim Hermsen =

Dutch water polo player (born 1947)

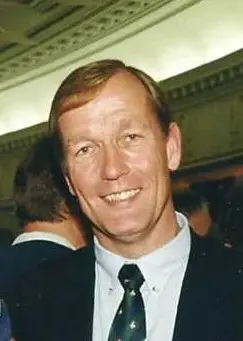
- Hermsen in 2000

Personal information
- Born: September 7, 1947 (age 78) Hilversum, Netherlands

Sport
- Sport: Water polo

Willem "Wim" Hermsen (born September 7, 1947) is an astrophysicist and a former water polo player from the Netherlands. He finished in seventh position with the Dutch Men's Water Polo Team at the 1972 Summer Olympics in Munich. Two of his brothers, André and Henk, also played water polo on the highest level, and represented the Netherlands in the Summer Olympics, in 1960 and 1964.

Hermsen obtained a PhD from Leiden University in 1980 and was a professor at the University of Amsterdam from 2004 to 2012, specializing in high-energy astrophysics, and now holds an emeritus position there.
