= Henk Hermsen =

Dutch water polo player (1937–2022)

Personal information
- Born: 29 August 1937; Hilversum, Netherlands
- Died: 9 April 2022 (aged 84)

Sport
- Sport: Water polo

Hendrik Willem "Henk" Hermsen (29 August 1937 – 9 April 2022) was a water polo player from the Netherlands, who competed in two Summer Olympics for his native country. In 1960 he finished in eighth position with the Dutch Men's Team. Four years later in Tokyo, he once again came in eighth with the Holland squad. He was born in Hilversum. Two of his brothers, André and Wim, also played water polo for the national team.

== See also ==
- Netherlands men's Olympic water polo team records and statistics
- List of men's Olympic water polo tournament goalkeepers
