= André Hermsen =

Dutch water polo player (born 1942)

Personal information
- Born: 13 March 1942 (age 83) Hilversum, Netherlands

Sport
- Sport: Water polo

Andréas "André" Hermsen (13 March 1942) is a former water polo player from the Netherlands, who finished in seventh position with the Dutch Men's Team at the 1968 Summer Olympics in Mexico City, Mexico. His brothers Henk and Wim also played for the Dutch National Team and competed at the Summer Olympics.
