= Agfa-Commando =

- Concentration camp
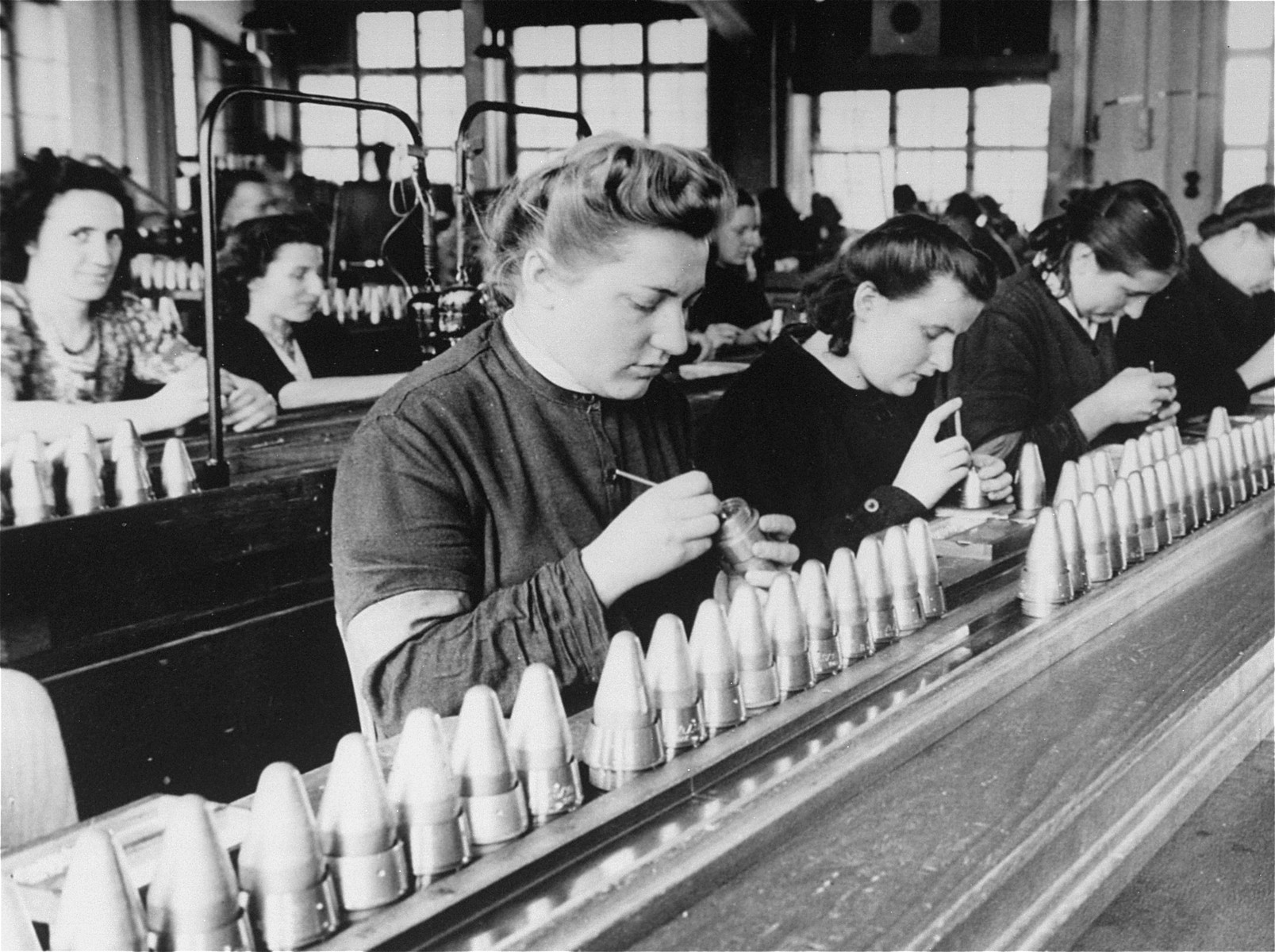
- Foreign workers from Stadelheim Prison work in the factory, May 1943
- Coordinates: 48°06′25″N 11°35′36″E
- Other names: Agfa Kamerawerke
- Known for: Assembly of ignition timing devices for long-range weapons
- Location: Upper Bavaria, Southern Germany
- Built by: Agfa
- Operated by: German Schutzstaffel (SS), U.S. Army (after World War II)
- Original use: manufacturing
- Operational: 1944–1945
- Inmates: Women: mainly Polish, Dutch, Slovenian
- Number of inmates: On the average approximately 500 women as slave labor
- Liberated by: United States, 1 May 1945
- Notable books: The Mastmakers' Daughters (2013)
- Website: www.kz-gedenkstaette-dachau.de

Agfa-Commando is the widely used name for the München-Giesing - Agfa Kamerawerke satellite camp of the Dachau concentration camp. By October 1944, the camp housed about five hundred women. They were used as slave laborers in the Agfa camera factory (part of the IG Farben group) in München-Giesing, a suburb on the S.W. side of Munich 14 miles (23 km) from the main camp of Dachau. The women assembled ignition timing devices for bombs, artillery ammunition and V-1 and V-2 rockets; they used every opportunity to sabotage the production. In January 1945, citing the lack of food, the prisoners conducted a strike, an unheard-of action in a concentration camp. Production ended on 23 April 1945 and the women marched toward Wolfratshausen, where their commander eventually surrendered to advancing American troops.

== Creation of subcamps ==
Dachau was the first concentration camp (known as a "KZ") that Reichsführer-SS Himmler had built. It was already in existence in 1933 and developed into a prototype for subsequent concentration camps such as Buchenwald, which appeared in 1937. The concentration camp was not geographically restricted to Dachau itself. At the onset of war, the SS increasingly employed concentration camp prisoners in armaments factories and these specific labor commands created a network of subcamps throughout Germany. In some cases the prisoners were accommodated in diverse, makeshift sleeping areas; in other cases the SS had them erect their own camp with watchtowers and fences. Many such subcamps, called the KZ-Außenlager, were laid out in similar fashion to the concentration camps. There were also SS camp commanders (SS-Lagerführer) and prisoner functionaries such as the "camp senior" (Lagerältester) or "block senior" (Blockältester).

Between 1927 and 1945, Agfa was the principal photographic equipment producer, and the largest photographic manufacturer in Germany. From 1941, Agfa Camera works produced exclusively for the Wehrmacht and employed a growing number of prisoners from Dachau. Most likely they were returned to the main camp in the evenings during the first years, and the subcamp in München-Giesing, where the laborers (Note: The mean population was 500. See Pierre Moulin, American Samurais— WWII Camps: From USA Concentration Camps to the Nazi Death Camps in Europe, AuthorHouse, 2012, ISBN 9781477213353 p. 42.) assembled timing devices, was not established until September 1944. The camp commander came in function on 12 September 1944.

== Prisoners ==
About five hundred prisoners from Eastern and Southeastern Europe, mainly Poland, arrived from Ravensbrück concentration camp on 13 September 1944. Little is known about the Polish women except that many of them were taken as slave labor in reprisal for the 1943 Warsaw Ghetto Uprising. Ludwig Eiber mentions a forty-year old Polish woman who died on 7 October 1944. In December 1944, after a Christmas party, two of these prisoners escaped, dressed as Josef and Maria in some borrowed clothing. According to an unconfirmed account of Leni Leuvenberg, twenty Polish women were killed during a bombing on 25 February 1945.

In October 1944, 250 Polish prisoners were sent back to Ravensbrück, in exchange for 193 Dutch women (including Elisabeth Hermsen), ten women from other West European countries and fifty women from Eastern and Southeastern Europe. Among the latter were twenty-one Slovenian political prisoners, mostly (communist) Yugoslav Partisans. The Dutch women arrived on October 15, 1944, from Ravensbrück where they had arrived in September from the Dutch concentration camp Vught. Most had been active in the resistance and had formed bonds already in Vught. They were a cohesive, supportive group; they marched singing into the cattle cars in Vught and walked singing into Ravensbrück concentration camp.

Out of the 193 Dutch women, only two died just before the war's end. In comparison, a third of the Dutch women who stayed behind in Ravensbrück did not survive.

== Prison life ==
Very little has been published and most facts were collected from written memoirs and oral testimony of the Dutch survivors. Ella Lingens spent a few months as a prisoner-doctor in the camp dispensary, from December 1944. Her book Gefangene der Angst was published in 2003. She is critical of the Dutch prisoners and calls them naive. Her views became a thorny issue with the Dutch ex-prisoners, in the long drawn-out compensation claims against IG Farben. French prisoner Marie Bartette published her memoirs in the Journal d'Arcachon in 1946-1947. In May, 2015, the stories of a number of Dutch Dachau political prisoners were published as Geen nummers maar namen. The publication contains input for Renny van Ommen-de Vries, Kiky Heinsius and Loes Bueninck.

The women were housed in an apartment block in München-Giesing. Part of the apartment had been bombed out before it was completed. The complex was surrounded by a high barbed wire fence with watch towers on the four corners. In the center court of the U-shaped building stood a wooden barrack mess hall. Six or seven prisoners slept in each small room. Reveille was at 0500 hours. The prisoners were counted, and marched to the Agfa factory. They returned to the subcamp compound at 1700 hours.

Religious meetings that had been held in Vught continued in secrecy in Dachau. One of the Dutch prisoners, Blockälteste Rennie van Ommen-de Vries, recalls the strength they obtained in these encounters in her biography. Since the women were not under guard in their rooms, they held regular devotions and produced their own song books. They translated parts of the Old Testament from a German Bible that was lent to them by a civilian factory worker.

In September 1944, Kurt Konrad Stirnweis, a Waffen-SS lieutenant and World War I veteran, was transferred from an artillery detail near Freising to the main camp at Dachau; he was subsequently placed in charge of Agfa-Commando.

== The Strike ==
In January, 1945 the 14-mile (23 km) road from the main camp in Dachau had become impassable as a result of the Allied bombings. The meals now became the responsibility of the Agfa management. The soup deteriorated by the day, and few women were spared digestive problems and complications from undernourishment. Disease was rampant: there were outbreaks of typhoid fever, scarlet fever and tuberculosis. Conditions at the main camp were no better; as the war drew to a close, Dachau became increasingly overcrowded with prisoners evacuated from other concentration camps. Consequently, transfer from the Agfa subcamp to the main camp's dispensary was close to a death sentence.

When the factory took over the distribution of the soup and started watering it down, while at the same time trying to raise the production quotas, the Dutch women spontaneously crossed their arms and stopped their work. The Slovenian women joined the protest. Strikes were unheard of in the concentration camps, so this would lead to severe punishments. In the end the women made their point that they just could not work under the conditions of a starvation diet and constant bombing raids. The chief Gestapo agent Willy Bach came down from the headquarters in Dachau and tried to find the instigators, but no one came forward. In the end, Mary Vaders, who had arrived from Ravensbrück on October 15, 1944, was selected at random and incarcerated in the Dachau bunker cell for seven weeks of solitary confinement. She came back damaged but unbroken. The remaining Dutch and Slovenian women were punished with hours standing in formation in the court yard.

== The Liberation ==
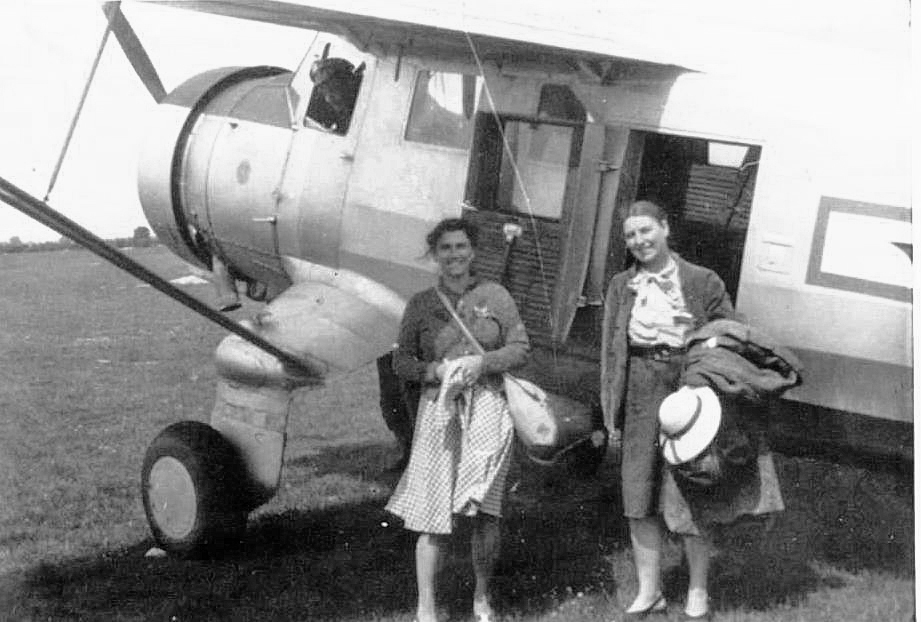
Munich Airport: going home from Munich, pilot Lt. Col. Jay Vessels, Nel Niemantsverdriet and Rennie van Ommen-de Vries

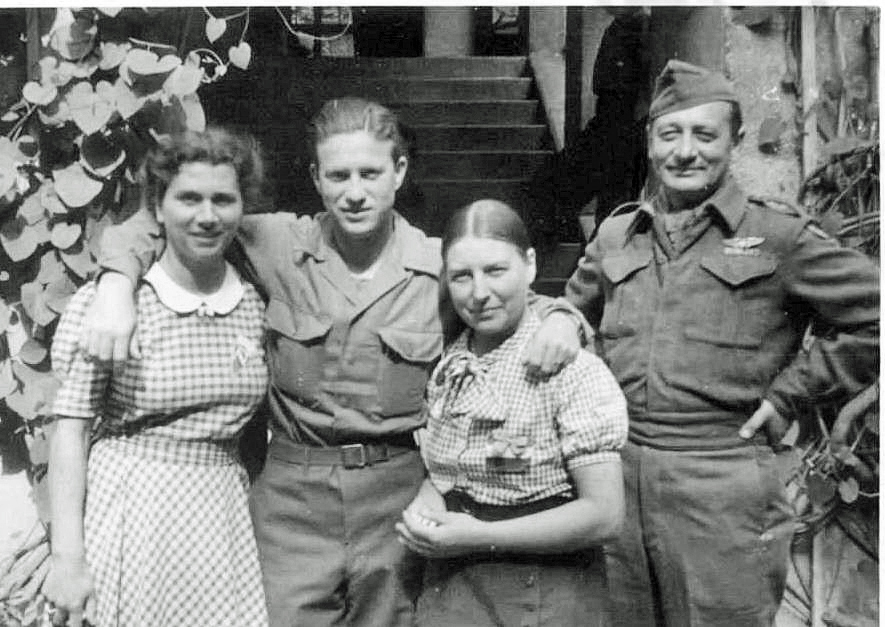
Grünwald: Nel Niemantsverdriet, Harry Cowe, Rennie van Ommen-de Vries, Sgt. Nathan Asch

As the war drew to a close and American personnel began to encircle the region, production at the factory halted on 23 April 1945. The Allied bombings and the advance of the Allied forces had cut off the supplies of raw material and distribution of the products. The camp commander was ordered to evacuate the prisoners and begin their death march in a southerly direction. The women were given a small sausage and a piece of bread for the journey, with their standard bowl of soup for their previous evening meal. Against his SS-superiors' orders, Stirnweis halted the march on 28 April just outside the town of Wolfratshausen and further persuaded a farmer named Walser to shelter the five hundred remaining prisoners in his hayloft. Despite specific orders to the contrary, he did not resume the march, but let the women shelter in place until the American troops drew closer.

On 1 May 1945 Stirnweis surrendered to the 12th Infantry Regiment of the 4th Infantry Division of the US Army and asked for protection of the prisoners. After about a week on the farm, being fed by the generous Walser couple the women were relocated nearby, in the abandoned labor camp Föhrenwald. This was the largest and longest-lived resettlement camp in post-war Europe. From Föhrenwald, the women were repatriated by the Red Cross.

=== Trial of camp commander ===
Initially, and based on cursory evidence, Stirnweis was accused of participating in cruelties and criminal usage of prisoners of war and civilians and sentenced to two years of labor after the war. However, the testimony of many of the women revealed no evidence of atrocities committed at the work detail at Agfa Camera works. According to former prisoners' testimony, sub-camp commander Lieutenant Kurt Konrad Stirnweis was a reasonable man. His sentence was abrogated upon the testimony of his former charges.

His deputy, a 29-year-old Latvian named Alexander Djerin, was sentenced to six years imprisonment for his cruel treatment of the prisoners, commencing 9 May 1945. Although there was no suggestion in the trial records that Sergeant Djerin had mistreated the women, he was convicted of mistreatment of prisoners during his work at Dachau.

== The US War Press in Dachau ==
In April 1945, a group of twenty-two war correspondents was quartered in a villa on the Isar river in Grünwald, another Munich suburb. Just before the women prisoners were transferred from the Walser farm to Föhrenwald, two of the men came looking for women to help in their kitchen. Rennie van Ommen-de Vries and Nel Niemantsverdriet accepted their offer.

Most of the correspondents had come up together from North Africa through Italy. War correspondent Ernie Pyle and cartoonist Bill Mauldin often were among them. Their job was to document the atrocities of Dachau and to accompany government VIPs and several Hollywood executives. One of the latter was film director William Wyler.

The press was under the command of Colonel Max Boyd, his next in command was Major (later Lieutenant Colonel) Jay R. Vessels (Minneapolis, Mn.), Air Corps Public Relations Officer. Claude Farmer was the driver and Don Jordan the cook. The journalists included Sholem Asch's son, Nathan Asch; AP reporter working at the Seattle Times Harry Cowe; Charley Green (from St. Paul, Mn.); Art Everett (from Bay City, Mi.); and Paul Zimmer (from Oakland, Ca.).

== Residents ==
Image	Name	Dates	Prisoner #	Nationality	Notes
	Marie Bartette	September 10, 1893 (Albi dans le Tarn) – November 27, 1961 (Saint-Séverin en Charente)	123286	French	Marie Bartette was a member of the French resistance.
	Joukje Grandia-Smits	17 April 1917 (Rotterdam) – 17 May 1985 (Rotterdam)	123135	Dutch	Joukje Grandia-Smits arrived from Ravensbrück. She was one of the most decorated Dutch female resistance survivors. She and Rennie van Ommen-de Vries often preached the Homily at their Sunday services. She received, among other awards, the War Medal of General Dwight D. Eisenhower.
	Simone Guilissen-Hoa	7 March 1916 (Beijing)– 30 May 1996 (Brussels)	123281	Belgian	Simone Guilissen-Hoa arrived on 13 October 1944 from Ravensbrück together with the Dutch prisoners. After the war she became a prominent European architect. A collection of photographs of her work is in the International Archive of Women in Architecture at Virginia Tech.
	Suzy van Hall	28 April 1907 (The Hague) – 9 July 1978 (Saint-Cybranet)	123257	Dutch	Suzy van Hall was a well-known dancer and partner of resistance member Gerrit van der Veen.
	Kiki Heinsius	12 April 1921 (Amsterdam) – 27 December 1990 (Amsterdam)	123202	Dutch	Kiki Heinsius actively helped Dutch men and women escape Nazi persecution. She was recognized by Yad Vashem as Righteous Among the Nations and was also awarded the Verzetsherdenkingskruis (Resistance Memorial Cross) by the Dutch government.
	Ella Lingens	18 November 1908 (Vienna) – 30 December 2002 (Vienna)		Austrian	Ella Lingens was a doctor who was in Auschwitz as a political prisoner and spent several months in the Agfa-Commando.
	Ada van Keulen	January 13, 1920 (Aalsmeer) – December 25, 2010 (Laren, North Holland)		Dutch	Ada van Keulen worked for the Dutch resistance and was betrayed and arrested in 1944. After the war, she became a teacher in Hilversum.

== Sources ==
- Hans Suijs (2020). Samen eervol overleefd (in Dutch). ISBN 978-94-6345-863-4.
- Bartette, Marie. "Les étapes d'une déportée" Société historique et archéologique d'Arcachon et du Pays de Buch, June 1945.
- Bayerisches Hauptstaatsarchiv, München; Abteilung IV Kriegsarchiv. Kriegstammrollen, 1914-1918, Volume: 15401. Kriegsstammrolle: Bd. 2. (Bavaria, Germany, WWI Personnel Rosters, 1914-1918 [database on-line]. Provo, UT, USA: Ancestry.com Operations, Inc., 2010.
- Bazyler, Michael J., Frank M. Tuerkheimer. Forgotten Trials of the Holocaust. NYU Press, 2014, ISBN 9781479849932
- Deputy Judge Advocate's Office, War Crimes Group, European Command. United States v Kurt Konrad Stirnweis. Case No. 000-50-2-77 (Kurt Konrad Stirnweis), 2 December 1947. Case No. 000-50-2-46 (Alexander Djerin) 22 July 1947. Jewish Virtual Library, Accessed 15 September 2015.
- Fengler, Silke. Agfa AG, Historisches Lexikon Bayerns, version 19.12.2011. Accessed 23 September 2015.
- Haus der Bayerischen Geschichte, Munich Camera Works (Agfa) Subcamp
- International Tracing Service. Miscellaneous Lists and Registers of German Concentration Camp Inmates. Germany, Dachau Concentration Camp Records, 1945.
- Lingens, Ella. "Gefangene der Angst", ein Leben im Zeichen des Widerstandes, Deuticke Verlag, 2003, ISBN 3216307123
- Moulin, Pierre. American Samurais— WWII Camps: From USA Concentration Camps to the Nazi Death Camps in Europe. AuthorHouse, 2012, ISBN 9781477213353
- Sachsse, Rolf. AGFA. Encyclopedia of 19th Century Photography, John Hannavy (ed). Routledge, 2013, ISBN 9781135873264
- Sinnema, Jos. Geen nummers maar Namen - Levensverhalen uit concentratiekamp Dachau. Gravistar, 2015, ISBN 978-90-9028962-5
- van Ommen, Jack. "The Mastmakers' Daughters". Create Space, 2015. ISBN 978-1481129275
- Zámečník, Stanislav. Das war Dachau. Luxemburg, 2002, ISBN 2-87996-948-4
- Steig, Alexander. Kamera - Ein künstlerisch-wissenschaftliches Projekt zum Außenlager Agfa-Kamerawerk, mit einem Erinnerungsbericht von Kiky Gerritsen-Heinsius. Icon Verlag, 2018, ISBN 9783928804929

== Websites ==
- Website Jan van Ommen (in Dutch and German)
