= Hilversum =

- City and municipality
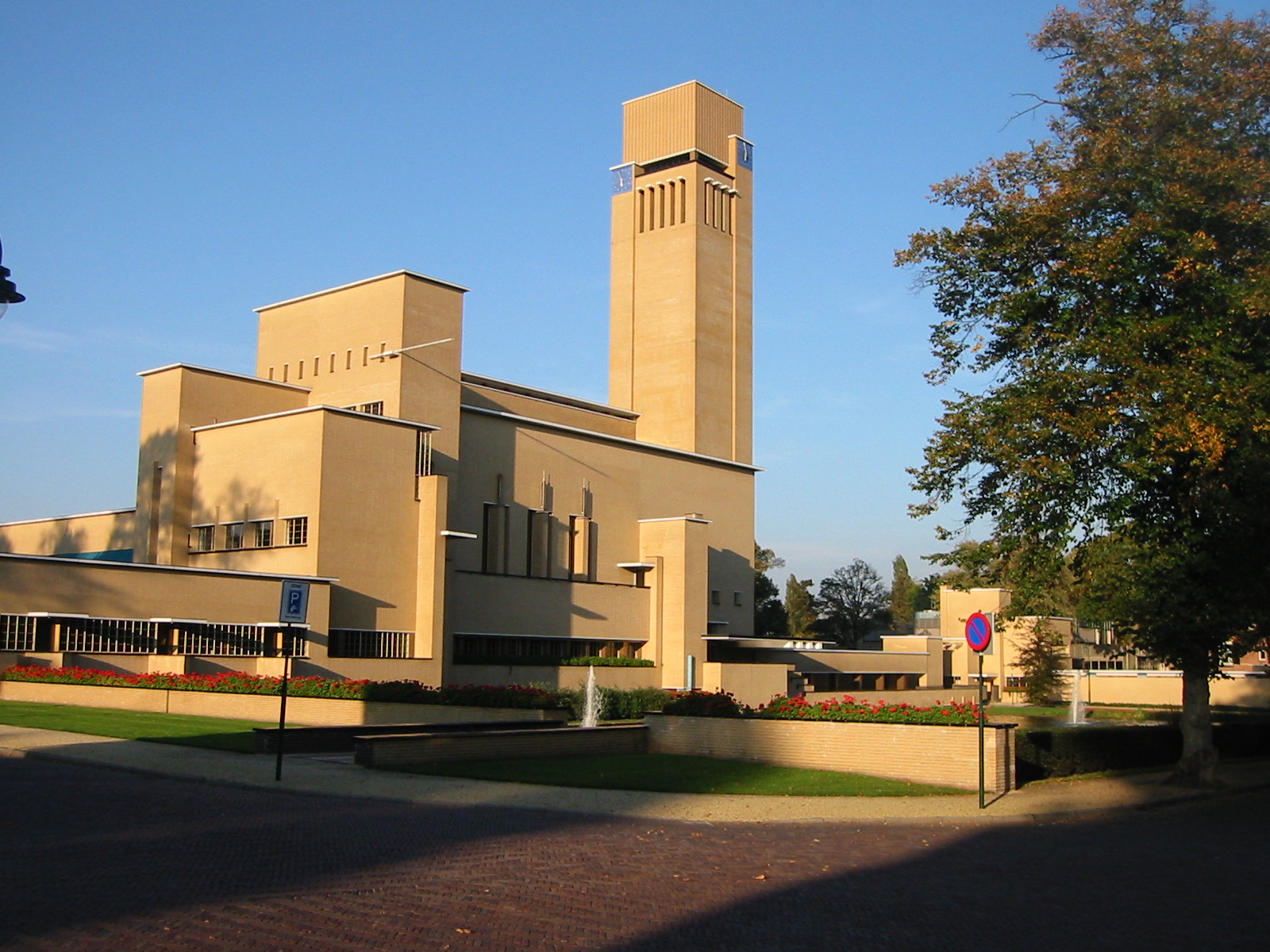
- Hilversum Town Hall

- Flag Coat of arms

- Location in North Holland
- Coordinates: 52°14′N 5°10′E
- Country: Netherlands
- Province: North Holland
- Region: Amsterdam metropolitan area
- Town Hall: Hilversum Town Hall

Government
  - Body: Municipal council
  - Mayor: Gerhard van den Top (Non-partisan)
  - Aldermen: List of aldermen: Wimar Jaeger; Floris Voorink; Willem van der Spek; Eric van der Want

Area
  - Total: 46.35 km^{2} (17.90 sq mi)
  - Land: 45.61 km^{2} (17.61 sq mi)
  - Water: 0.74 km^{2} (0.29 sq mi)
- Elevation: 15 m (49 ft)

Population (January 2021)
  - Total: 94,426
  - Density: 2,000/km^{2} (5,200/sq mi)
- Demonym(s): Hilversummer (male), Hilversumse (female)
- Time zone: UTC+1 (CET)
  - Summer (DST): UTC+2 (CEST)
- Postcode: 1200–1223
- Area code: 035
- Website: www.hilversum.nl

Hilversum (Dutch pronunciation: [ˈɦɪlvərsʏm]) is a city and municipality in the province of North Holland, Netherlands. Located in the heart of the Gooi, it is the largest urban centre in that area. It is surrounded by heathland, woods, meadows, lakes and smaller towns. Hilversum is part of the Randstad, one of the largest conurbations in Europe, and the Amsterdam metropolitan area; it is about 22 km southeast of Amsterdam's city centre and about 15 km north of Utrecht.

The city is home to several major radio, television, and newspaper companies such as NOS. Hilversum is thus known for being the mediastad (media city) of the Netherlands.

== Town ==
Hilversum lies 24 km (15 mi) south-east of Amsterdam and 15 km (9.3 mi) north of Utrecht. The town is known for its architecturally important Town Hall (Raadhuis Hilversum), designed by Willem Marinus Dudok and built in 1931.

Hilversum has one public library, two swimming pools (Van Hellemond Sport and De Lieberg), several sports halls, and several shopping centers (such as Hilvertshof, Winkelcentrum Kerkelanden, De Riebeeckgalerij, and Winkelcentrum Seinhorst). Locally, the town center is known as het dorp (Dutch for 'the village').

== Geography ==
Hilversum is located on the sandy, hilly parts of the Gooi region and has four hills: the Boomberg (closest to the town center); the Trompenberg (now a luxury residential area), the Hoorneboeg (farther to the south), and two kilometers east of there, the Zwaluwenberg (25 m), home to the headquarters of the inspector-general of the armies since 1950. These hills date from the period of the Ice-age, when Hilversum was the southern-most point covered by glaciers.

The surrounding towns of Hilversum are Nieuw-Loosdrecht, Bussum, Kortenhoef, Blaricum, Hollandsche Rading, Lage Vuursche, Maartensdijk, 's-Graveland, Laren, Nederhorst den Berg, and Ankeveen.

Hilversum consists of the following districts and neighborhoods: Center (Langgewenstbuurt, Sint Vitusbuurt, Havenstraatbuurt, and Centrum), Northwest (Nimrodpark, Trompenberg North, Trompenberg South, Media Park, Raadhuiskwartier, and Boomberg), Northeast (North, Johannes Geradtswegbuurt, Erfgooiersbuurt, and AZC Crailo), East (Geuzenbuurt, Electrobuurt, Astronomiebuurt, Science neighborhood, Kamrad, Kleine Driftbuurt and Liebergen), Southeast (Bloemkwartier Noord, Bloemenkwartier Zuid, Schilderskwartier, 't Hoogt van' t Kruis, Arenaparkkwartier and West Indiëkwartier), Zuid (Schrijverskwartier, Staatsliedenkwartier and Zeeheldenkwartier), Southwest (Kerkelanden, Havenkwartier, Zeverijn and Het Rode Dorp) and Hilversumse Meent. In 1767, Hilversum was still divided into 4 districts (quarters): the Neuquartier, Groestquartier, Kerkquartier, and the Sandtbergerquartier.

The Oude Haven (old harbour) in the southwest is at the end of the Gooische Vaart. The construction of the canal between 's-Graveland and Hilversum was done in stages over 240 years. The canal was completed in 1876. Later, a modern harbor was dug, surrounded by an industrial estate. There is also a leisure harbor.

== International ==
Hilversum has a variety of international schools, such as the Violenschool and International School Hilversum . Also, Nike's, Hunkemöller's and Converse's European headquarters are located in Hilversum.

== History ==
Earthenware found in Hilversum gives its name to the Hilversum culture, which is an early- to mid-Bronze Age, or 1800–1200 BC material culture. Artifacts from this prehistoric civilization bear similarities to the Wessex Culture of southern Britain and may indicate that the first Hilversum residents emigrated from that area.

The first brick settlements formed around 900, but it was not until 1305 that the first official mention of Hilversum ("Hilfersheem" from "Hilvertshem" meaning "houses between the hills") was found. At that time it was a part of Naarden, the oldest town in the Gooi area.

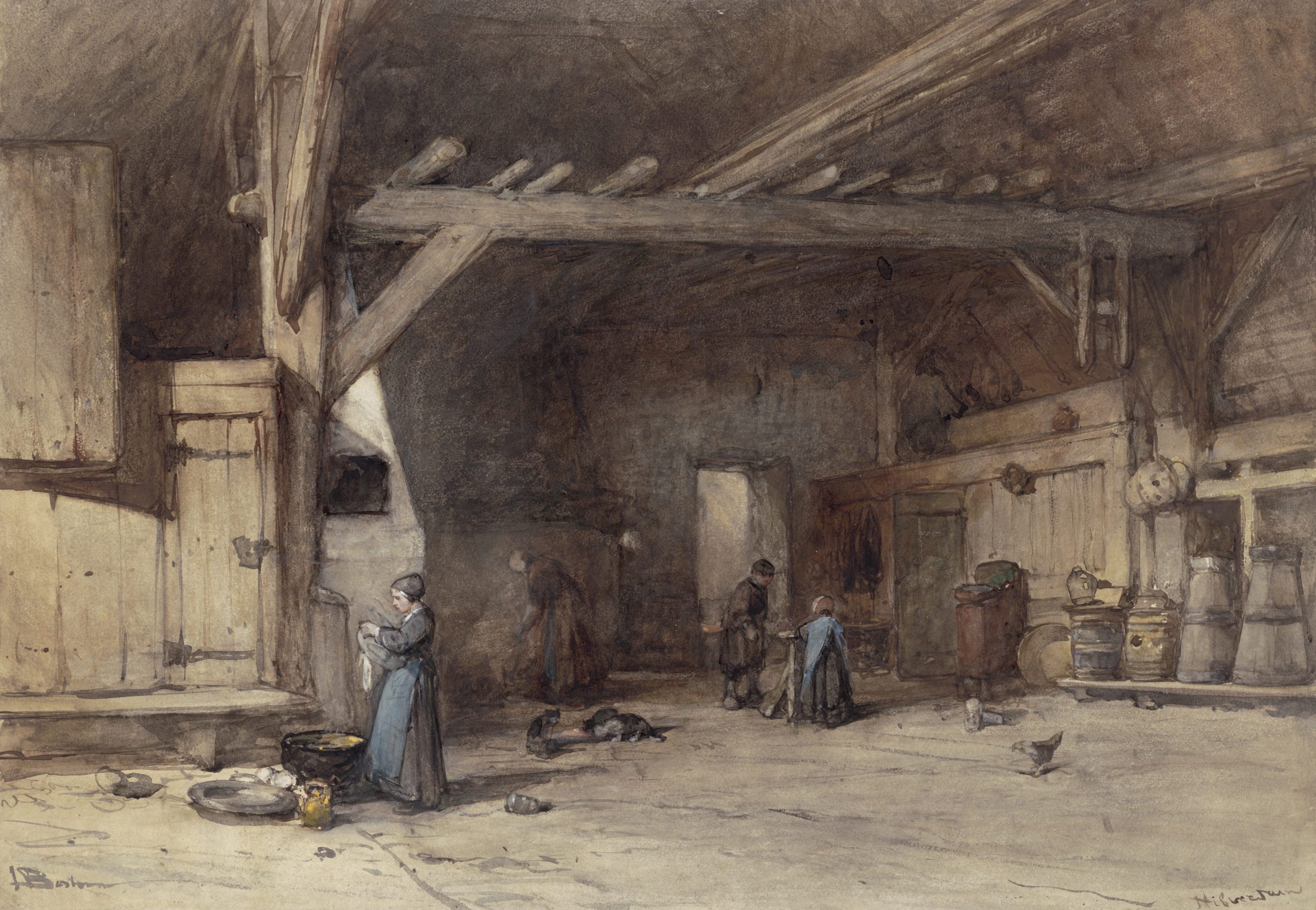
Interior of a farm near Hilversum, a 19th-century drawing by Johannes Bosboom

Farming, raising sheep, and wool manufacturing were the main sources of income for inhabitants of the Gooi region in the Middle Ages. In 1424, Hilversum received its first official independent status. This made further growth possible because permission was no longer needed from neighboring Naarden for new industrial development.

The town grew further in the 17th century when the Dutch economy was strong, and several canals were built connecting it indirectly to Amsterdam.

In 1725 and 1766 large fires destroyed most of the town, leveling parts of the old townhouse and the church next to it. The town overcame these setbacks and the textile industry continued to develop, among other ways by devising a way to weave cows' hair.

In the 19th century a substantial textile and tapestry industry emerged, aided by a railway link to Amsterdam in 1874. From that time onward the town grew quickly with wealthy commuters from Amsterdam moving in, building themselves large villas in the wooded surroundings, and gradually starting to live in Hilversum permanently. Despite this growth, Hilversum was never granted city rights so it is still referred to by many locals as "het dorp", or "the village."

For the 1928 Summer Olympics in neighboring Amsterdam, it hosted all of the non-jumping equestrian and the running part of the modern pentathlon event.

The Nederlandse Seintoestellen Fabriek (NSF) company established a professional transmitter and radio factory in Hilversum in the early 1920s, growing into the largest of its kind in the Netherlands.

Following the defeat of Allied forces in the Netherlands in 1940, and its occupation by Nazi Germany, Hilversum became the headquarters of the German Army (Heer) in the Netherlands. On 25 and 26 February 1941, most of Hilversum's factories went on strike against the start of the Holocaust in the so-called February strike (Amsterdam Docker's Strike). Some 10,000 people took part. The Holocaust took the lives of 2,000 Hilversum Jews and the community never fully recovered. Since 2015 there has been an annual remembrance service. Some 50 Hilversummers were awarded the title of Righteous among the nations from Yad Vashem, including Victor Kugler, one of Anne Frank's helpers.

In 1948, NSF was taken over by Philips. However, Dutch radio broadcasting organizations (followed by television broadcasters during the 1950s) centralised their operations in Hilversum, providing a source of continuing economic growth. The concentration of broadcasters in Hilversum has given it its enduring status as the media city for the Netherlands.

In 1964, the population reached a record high of over 103,000. However, the textile industry had started its decline; only one factory, Veneta, managed to continue into the 1960s, when it also had to close. Another major industry, the chemical factory IFF, also closed by the end of the 1960s.

After the 1960s, the population gradually declined, until stabilising at around 86,000 in 2006 and rising to 90,000 in 2018. Several factors other than the slump in manufacturing contributed to this decline: one is the reduction in average family size, with fewer people living in each house; second, the town is virtually unable to expand because much surrounding land was sold by city architect W.M. Dudok to the Goois Natuurreservaat (nl); third, the rapid increase in property values forced many people to move to less expensive areas in the Netherlands.

Hilversum was one of the first towns to have a local party of the populist movement called Leefbaar ("liveable"). Founded by former social-democrat Jan Nagel, it was initially held at bay for alderman positions. In 2001, Nagel from Leefbaar Hilversum teamed up with Leefbaar Utrecht leaders to found a national Leefbaar Nederland party.

The town has undertaken many improvements, including renovating its central train station, renovation of the main shopping centre (Hilvertshof), and development of new dining and retail districts downtown including the "vintage" district in the Leeuwenstraat. Several notable architectural accomplishments include the Institute for Sound and Vision, and Zanderij Crailoo (nl), the largest man-made wildlife crossing in the world.

The nearby Media Park was the scene of the 2002 assassination of politician Pim Fortuyn; in 2015, a gunman carrying a false pistol stormed into Nederlandse Omroep Stichting's headquarters, demanding airtime on the evening news.

== Culture ==
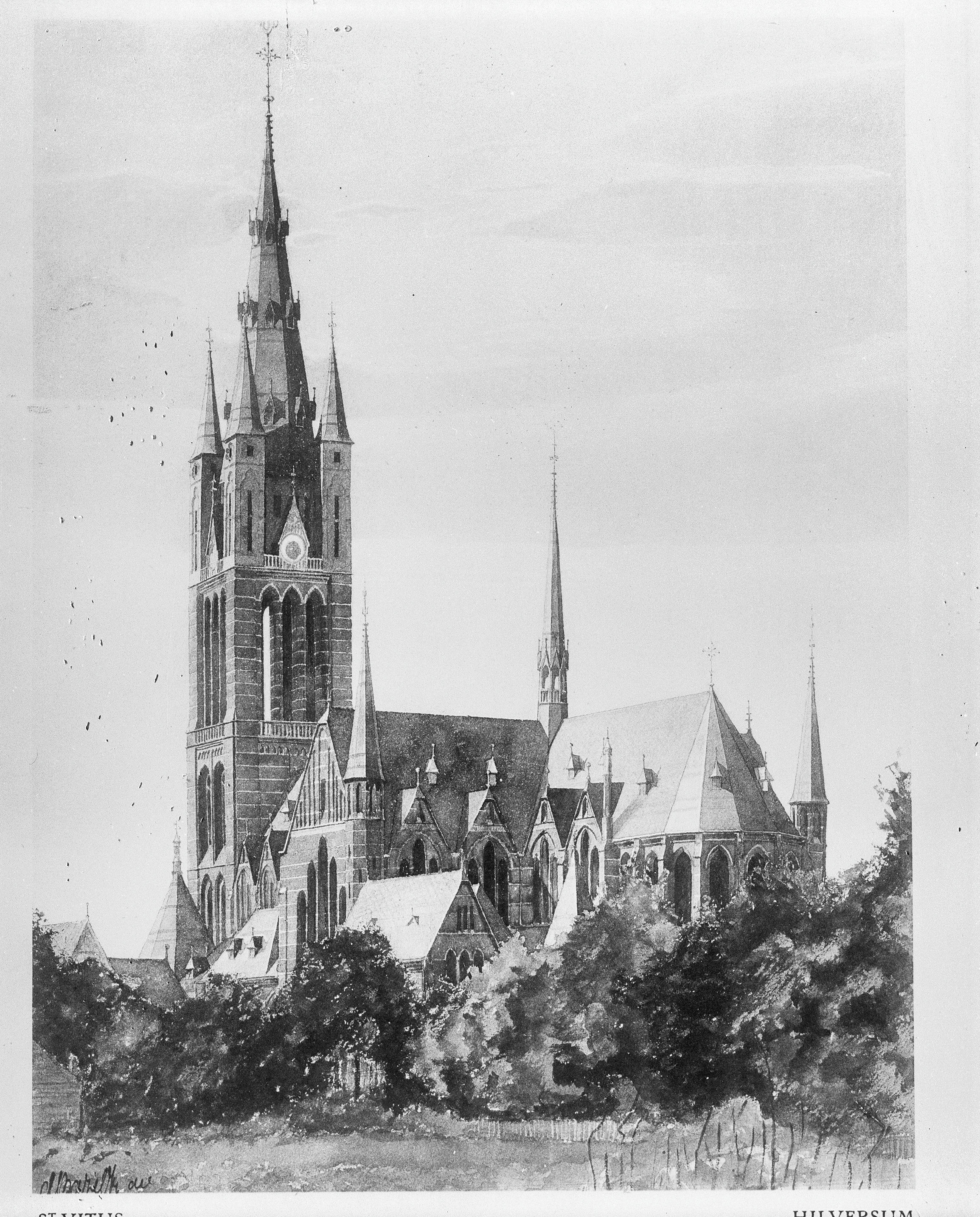
St. Vitus Church, architect Pierre Cuypers, in a watercolour by Karel de Bazel (1891)

There is the large Catholic neo-gothic St. Vitus church (P.J.H. Cuypers, 1892, bell tower 96 metres (315 ft). The city played host to many landscape artists during the 19th century, including Barend Cornelis Koekkoek.

In the 1950s and 1960s the city played host to a major European Tennis tournament.

The 1958 Eurovision Song Contest took place in Hilversum. In 2020 the international television event Eurovision: Europe Shine a Light was broadcast from Studio 21 in Hilversum's Media Park. This event was held in place of the Eurovision Song Contest 2020 which was cancelled due to the COVID-19 pandemic.

=== Broadcasting ===
Hilversum is often called the "media city", as it is the principal centre for radio and television broadcasting in the Netherlands, and is home to an extensive complex of radio and television studios, as well as the headquarters of the broadcasting organisations which make up the Dutch public broadcasting system. Hilversum is also home to many newer commercial television production companies. Radio Netherlands, which had been broadcasting worldwide via shortwave radio since the 1920s, was also based in Hilversum until it was dissolved in 2013.

The following is a list of organisations that have, or are continuing to, broadcast from Hilversum:

- NCRV (1924–2013)
- KRO (1925–2013)
- VARA (1925–2013)
- VPRO (1926–present)
- AVRO (1927–2013)
- RVU (1930–2010)
- IKOR (1946–1975)
- NRU (1947–1969)
- RNW (1947–2012)
- NTS (1951–1969)
- IKON (1976–2015)
- NOT (1962–1996)
- Teleac (1963–2010)
- TROS (1964–2013)
- EO (1967–present)
- NOS (1969–present)
- VOO (1976–1995)
- Human (1989–present)
- NPS (1995–2010)
- BNN (1997–2013)
- MAX (2005–present)
- PowNed (2009–present)
- WNL (2009–present)
- NTR (2010–present)
- AVROTROS (2014–present)
- BNNVARA (2014–present)

One result of the town's history as an important radio transmission centre is that many older radio sets throughout Europe featured Hilversum as a pre-marked dial position on their tuning scales.

Dutch national voting in the Eurovision Song Contest is normally co-ordinated from Hilversum.

== Transport ==
The video of the opening of the bridge over the railway in 1930 by the mayor Lambooy

=== Airport ===
Hilversum Airport is located in the southwest of the municipality. Next to it is the former Marine Training Camp (MOK), now Corporal Van Oudheusden Barracks for the medical troops. In wartime the airfield was expanded significantly by the German military. They also set up an assembly line for training aircraft, produced by Fokker in Weesp.

=== Railway ===
Hilversum is well connected to the Dutch railway network, and has three stations.

Station	Notes
Hilversum	Opened on 10 June 1874. Served by regional, Intercity and international trains.
Hilversum Media Park	Opened on 26 May 1974. Previously named Hilversum NOS (1974–1989) and Hilversum Noord (1989–2013). Only served by regional trains.
Hilversum Sportpark	Opened on 1 June 1886. Previously named Amersfoortsche Straatweg (1886–1919) and Soestdijker Straatweg (1919–1965). Only served by regional trains.

=== Public buses ===
Most local and regional buses are operated by Connexxion, but two of the bus routes are operated by Syntus Utrecht and two others by TransDev and Pouw Vervoer. Regional bus route 320 is operated by both Connexxion and Pouw Vervoer. In 2018, major road works started to make room for a new BRT bus lane from Hilversum to Huizen, set to open in early 2021.

==== Local bus lines ====
Line	Route	Operator	Notes
1	Hilversum Station - Centrum (Downtown) - Kerkelanden	Connexxion	
2	Hilversum Station - Over 't Spoor - Erfgooiers	Connexxion	
3	Hilversum Station - Hilversum Sportpark Station - Tergooi Ziekenhuis (Hospital)	Connexxion	

==== Regional bus lines ====
Line	Route	Operator	Notes
58	Hilversum Station - Hollandsche Rading - Maartensdijk - Bilthoven - De Bilt - Zeist	U-OV and Pouw Vervoer	Mon-Sat during daytime hours only. U-OV operates this route during weekdays, Pouw Vervoer on Saturdays.
59	Hilversum Station - Lage Vuursche - Den Dolder - Huis ter Heide - Zeist	U-OV and Pouw Vervoer	Mon-Sat during daytime hours only. U-OV operates this route during weekdays, Pouw Vervoer on Saturdays.
70	Amersfoort Station - Soest Zuid - Soest Overhees - Soestdijk Noord - Hooge Vuursche - Hilversum Station	Syntus Utrecht; a few runs are operated by Pouw Vervoer and Van Kooten	
100	(Hilversum Station -) Blaricum Bijvanck - Huizen - Naarden-Bussum Station	Connexxion	The route between Hilversum and Blaricum is only served during weekday daytime hours.
104	Hilversum Station - Hilversum-Zuid - Nieuw-Loosdrecht	Connexxion	
105	Hilversum Station - Kortenhoef - 's-Graveland - Hilversumse Meent - Naarden-Bussum Station	Connexxion	
106	(Hilversum Station - Kortenhoef -) Nederhorst den Berg - Weesp Station	Connexxion	Mon-Sat only. Only runs through from Nederhorst den Berg to Hilversum Mon-Fri during daytime hours.
107	Hilversum Station - Hilversum Mediapark - Bussum - Blaricum Ziekenhuis (Hospital)	Connexxion	
108	Hilversum Station - Laren - Blaricum Dorp - Huizen	Connexxion	
109	Hilversum Station - Eemnes - Laren - Blaricum Ziekenhuis (Hospital) - Naarden-Bussum Station	Connexxion	
121	Hilversum Station - Oud-Loosdrecht - Loenen aan de Vecht - Vinkeveen - Wilnis - Mijdrecht	Syntus Utrecht	Mon-Sat during daytime hours only. Only runs between Hilversum and Vinkeveen, Groenlandsekade on Saturdays.
320	Hilversum Station - Hilversum Arenapark - Blaricum Bijvanck - Huizen - Blaricum Ziekenhuis (Hospital) - Naarden Gooimeer - Muiden P+R - Amsterdam Amstel Station	Connexxion and Pouw Vervoer	During weekday daytime hours, Saturday mornings and Sunday evenings, some buses only run between Hilversum and Huizen. During morning rush hours, 4 extra buses run between Hilversum Station and Hilversum Arenapark.
N32	Hilversum Station → Eemnes → Blaricum Bijvanck → Huizen	Pouw Vervoer	Only runs during Saturday late nights (between midnight and 5 AM).

== Local government ==
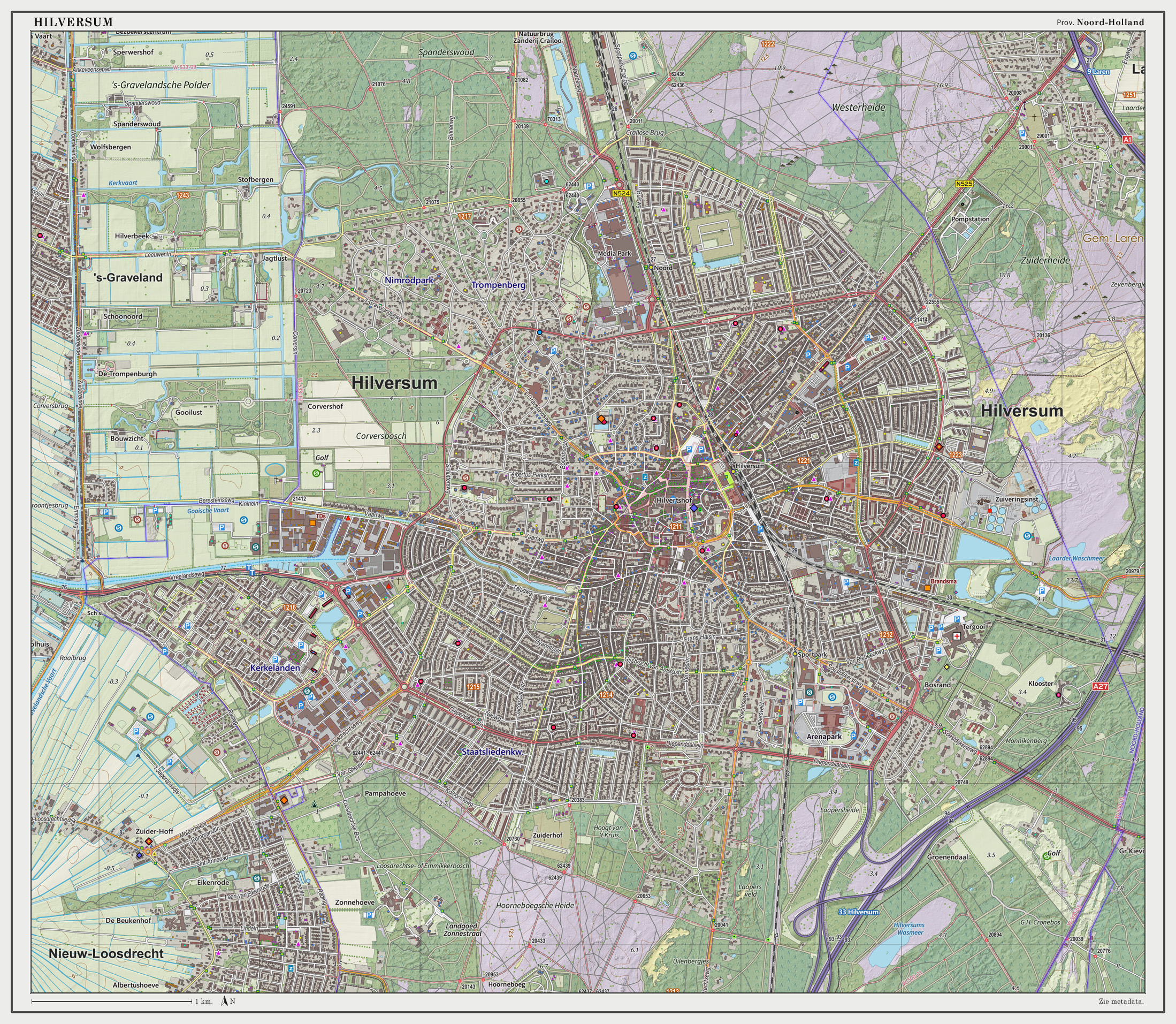
Topographic map of the city of Hilversum, March 2014

The municipal council of Hilversum consists of 37 seats, which are divided as follows since the last local election of 2022:

- Hart voor Hilversum – 8 seats
- D66 – 7 seats
- VVD – 5 seats
- GroenLinks – 4 seats
- CDA – 4 seats
- Democraten Hilversum – 3 seat
- PvdA – 2 seats
- SP – 2 seats
- ChristenUnie – 1 seat
- Belang van Nederland (BVNL) – 1 seat

=== Government ===
After the 2022 elections, the municipal government was made up of aldermen from the political parties Hart voor Hilversum, VVD, GroenLinks and CDA. The mayor is Gerhard van den Top.

Hart voor Hilversum, a local party, is the largest group on the council. Originally a part of Leefbaar Hilversum, it separated to form a party called DLPH, which won 1 seat in the 2006 elections. In 2006 leadership was taken over by Léonie Sazias, a TV celebrity. She later changed the party name to Hart voor Hilversum. They won 3 seats in the 2010 elections, 6 in 2014 and 8 in both 2018 and 2022.

== Notable residents ==
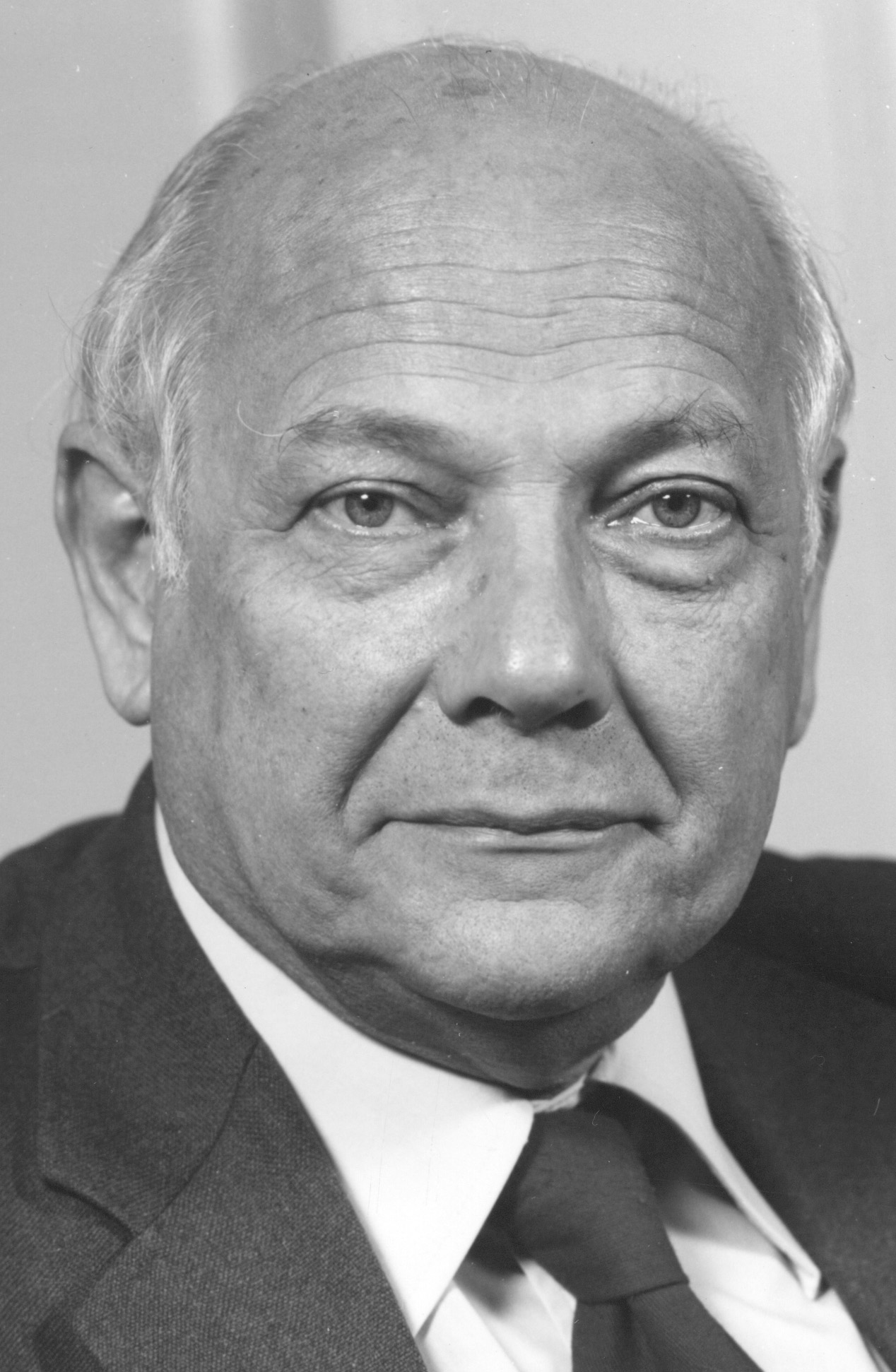
Joop den Uyl, 1975

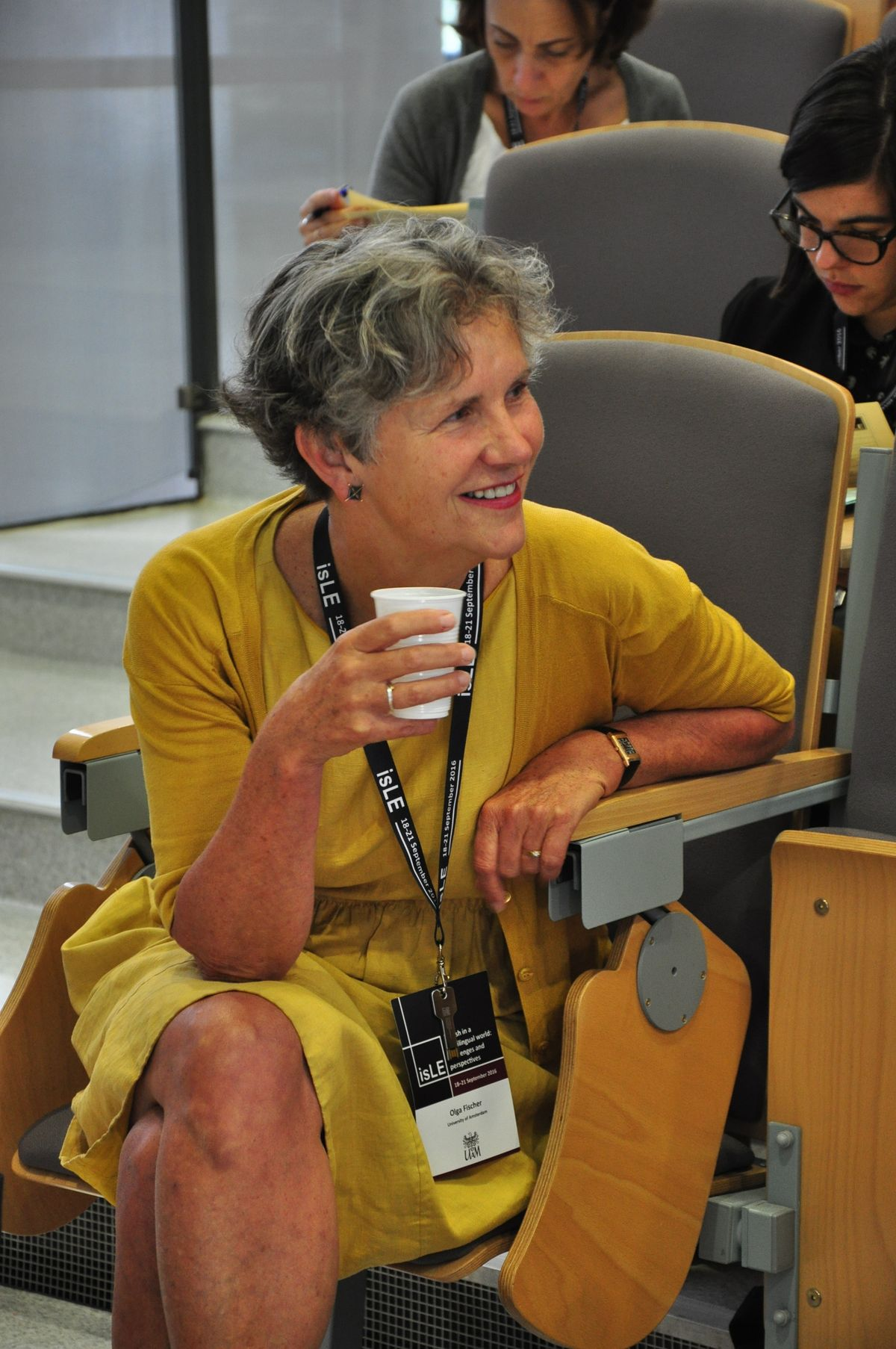
Olga Fischer, 2016

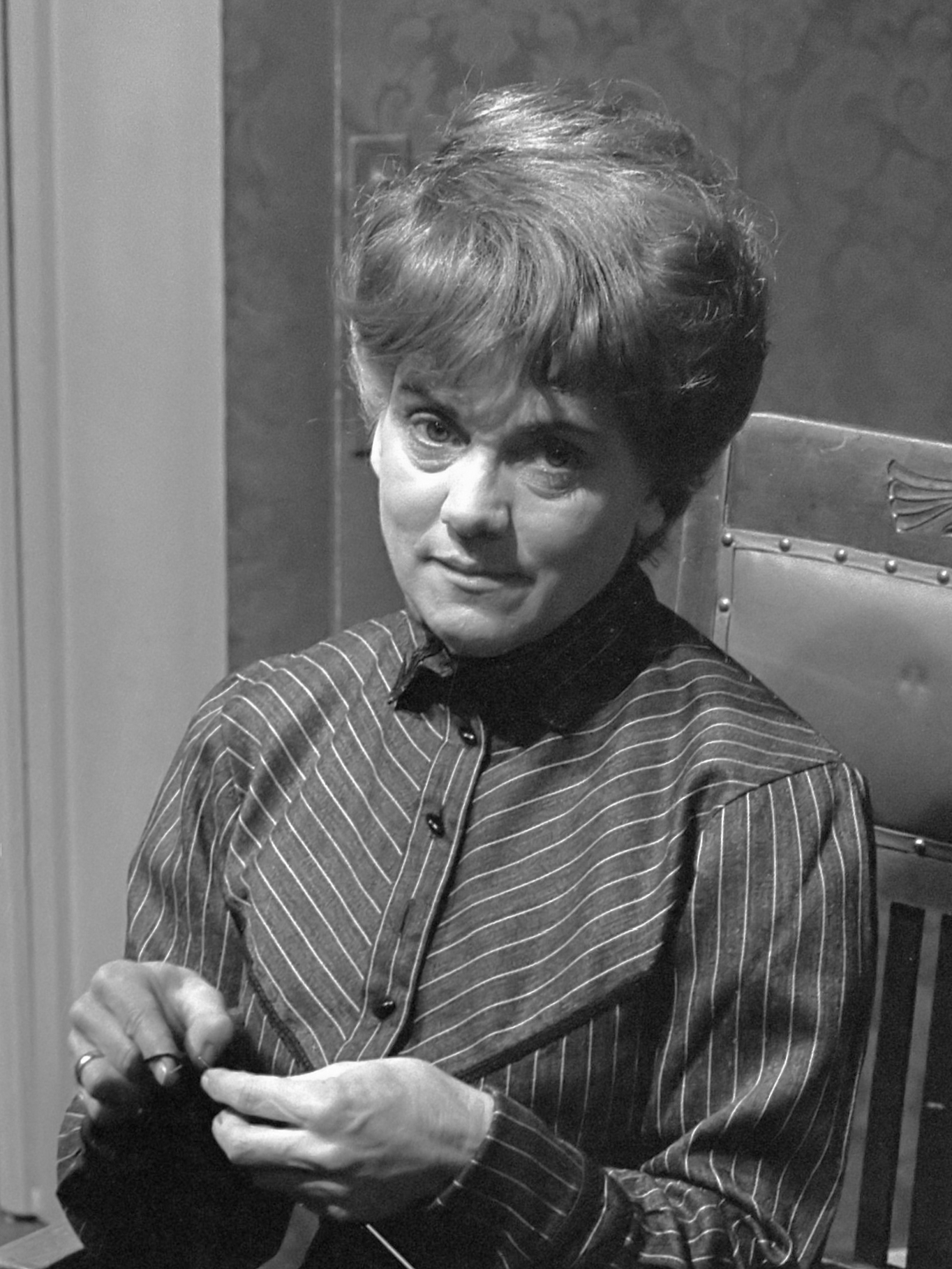
Emmy Lopes Dias, 1970

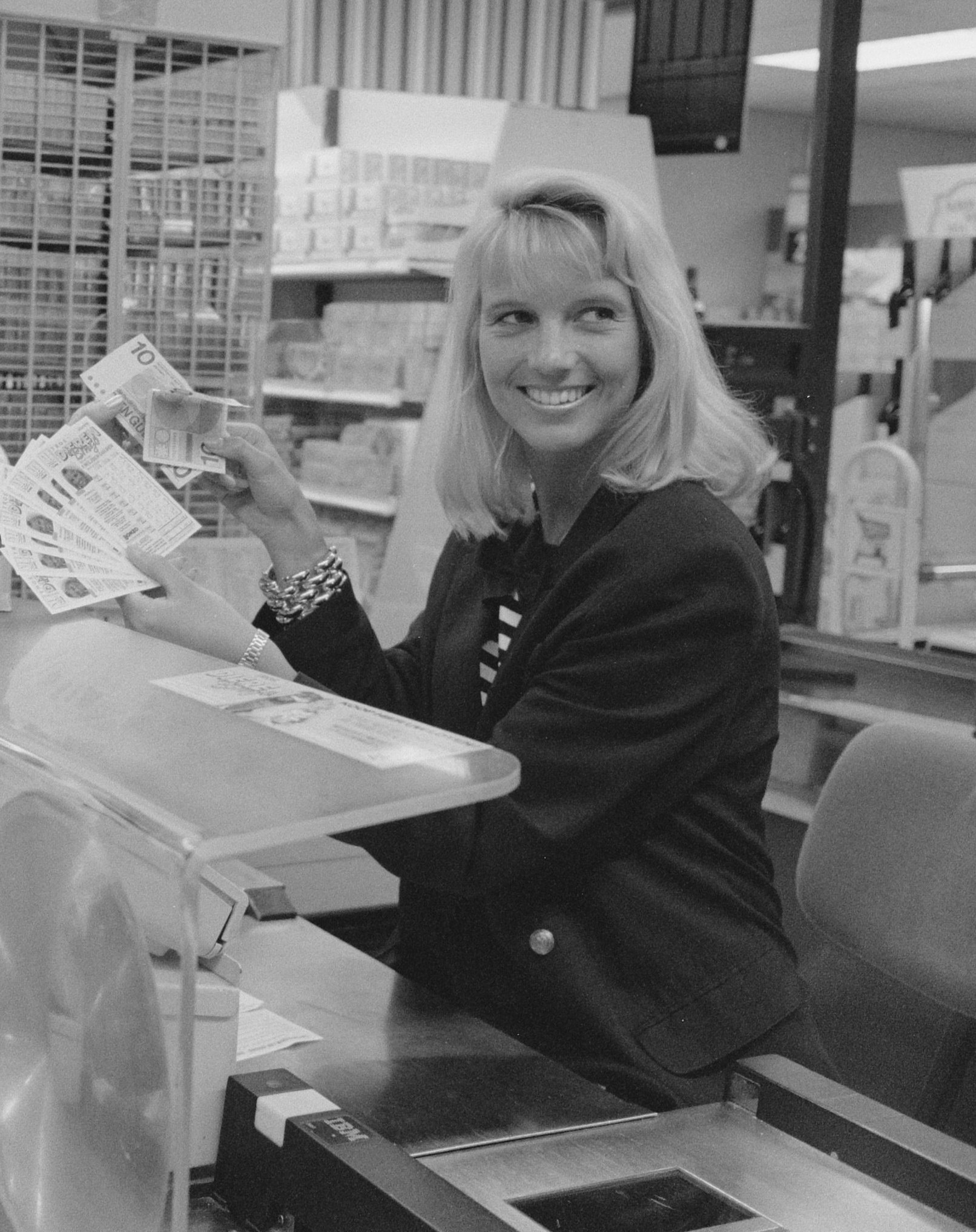
Linda de Mol, 1989

Notable people born in Hilversum:

=== Public service & public thinking ===
- H. A. Sinclair de Rochemont (1901–1942), a Dutch fascist and later a Nazi collaborator
- Jan van den Brink (1915–2006), a Dutch politician and businessman
- Joop den Uyl (1919–1987), Prime Minister of the Netherlands 1973 to 1977
- Wilhelmus Luijpen (1922–1980), a Dutch philosopher, Catholic priest of the Order of St. Augustine and an existential phenomenologist
- Ineke van Wetering (1934–2011), a Dutch anthropologist who studied witchcraft in Suriname
- Hubert van Es (1941–2009), war journalist in Vietnam
- John Gerretsen (born 1942), politician in Ontario, Canada
- Ernst Bakker (1946–2014), a Dutch politician, Mayor of Hilversum 1998 to 2011
- Olga Fischer (born 1951), a Dutch linguist and academic
- Bartha Knoppers (born 1951), a Canadian lawyer
- Léonie Sazias (1957–2022), Politician and TV presenter
- André Rouvoet (born 1962), a retired Dutch politician
- Janneke Raaijmakers (born 1973), a Dutch historian of the Middle Ages, focus on the Fulda monastery

=== The arts ===
- Jan Teulings (1905–1989), a Dutch actor
- Emmy Lopes Dias (1919–2005), a Dutch stage, radio, and TV actress and advocate for the right to die
- Pim Jacobs (1934–1996), a Dutch jazz pianist, composer and TV presenter
- Chris Hinze (born 1938), a Dutch former pianist, now jazz and New Age flautist
- Harry van Hoof (born 1943), a Dutch conductor, composer and music arranger
- Harmke Pijpers (born 1946), a Dutch journalist and radio and TV presenter
- Dick Diamonde (1947–2024), a retired Dutch Australian bass guitar player
- Ton Scherpenzeel (born 1952), keyboardist and founder of the Dutch rock band Kayak
- Pim Koopman (1953–2009), drummer of the Dutch progressive rock band, Kayak
- Max Werner (1953–2024), lead singer and drummer of the rock band Kayak
- Erland Van Lidth de Jeude (1953–1987), a Dutch-American actor, opera singer and amateur wrestler
- Arjan Ederveen (born 1956), a Dutch actor, comedian, TV scriptwriter and TV director
- Luc Leestemaker (1957–2012), an American abstract expressionist artist
- Arjen Anthony Lucassen (born 1960), a Dutch singer, songwriter, musician and record producer
- Bert Boeren (born 1962), a Dutch jazz trombonist and educator
- Ruud de Wild (born 1969) a Dutch radio host
- Liza Ferschtman (born 1979), a Dutch classical violinist
- Marieke Blaauw (born 1979), a Dutch animator
- Nicolette Kluijver (born 1984), a Dutch TV presenter and former model
- Rami Ismail (born 1988), a Dutch-Egyptian video games developer
- Lucas & Arthur Jussen, Lucas (born 1993) and Arthur (born 1996) are brothers and form a piano duo.
- Sick Individuals (founded 2010), a Dutch electronic dance music act

=== Science & business ===
- J. W. B. Gunning (1860–1913), Dutch physician and museum director in South Africa
- Claudia Bernadine Elisabeth Hartert (1863–1958), ornithologist
- Joop van Oosterom (1937–2016), Dutch billionaire and chess and billiards sponsor
- Bessel Kok (born 1941), Dutch businessman and chess organiser
- Wim van den Brink (born 1952), Professor of Psychiatry and Addiction at the University of Amsterdam
- Henkjan Honing (born 1959), Professor of Music Cognition at the University of Amsterdam
- John de Mol (born 1955), media tycoon and TV producer
- Pieter Geelen (born 1964), Dutch entrepreneur, co-developed the Mapcode
- Olaf Swantee (born 1966), Dutch businessman, former CEO of EE

=== Sport ===
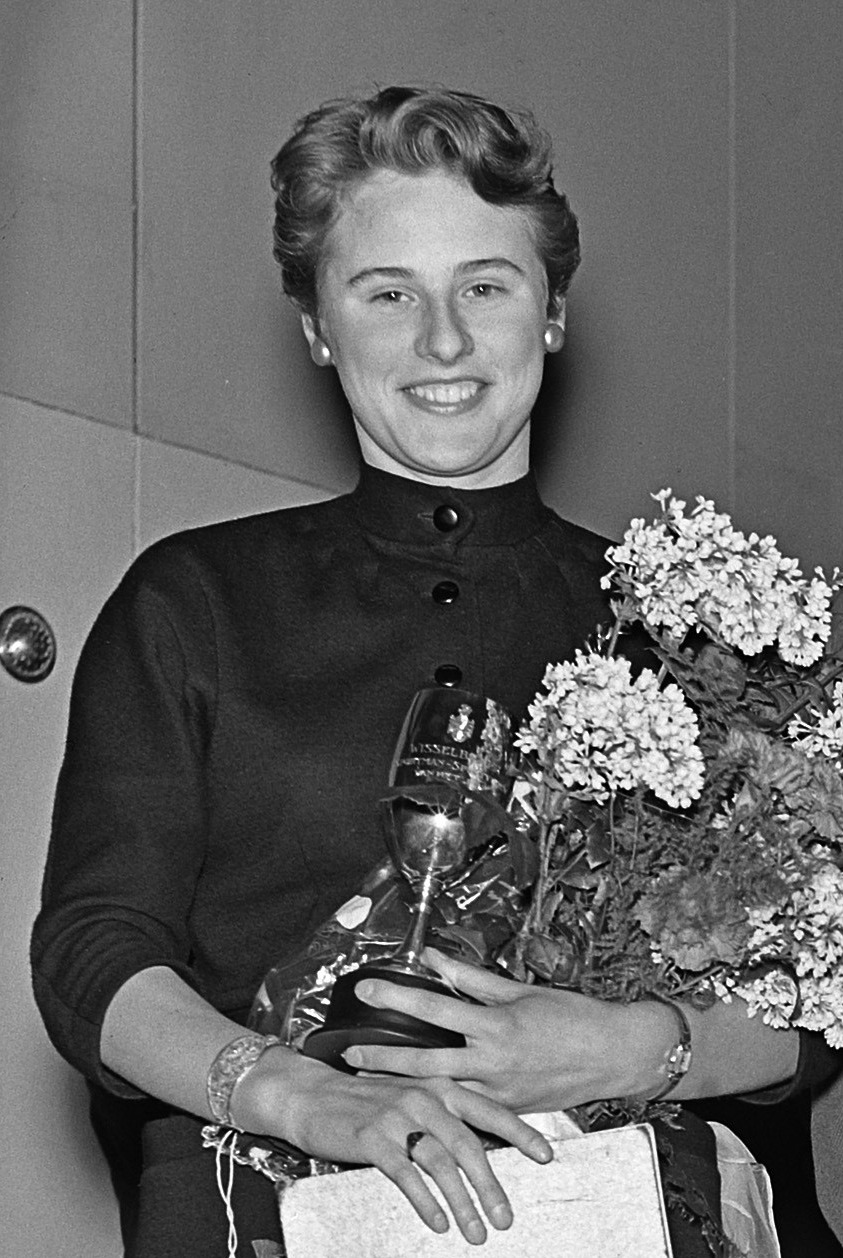
Geertje Wielema, 1955

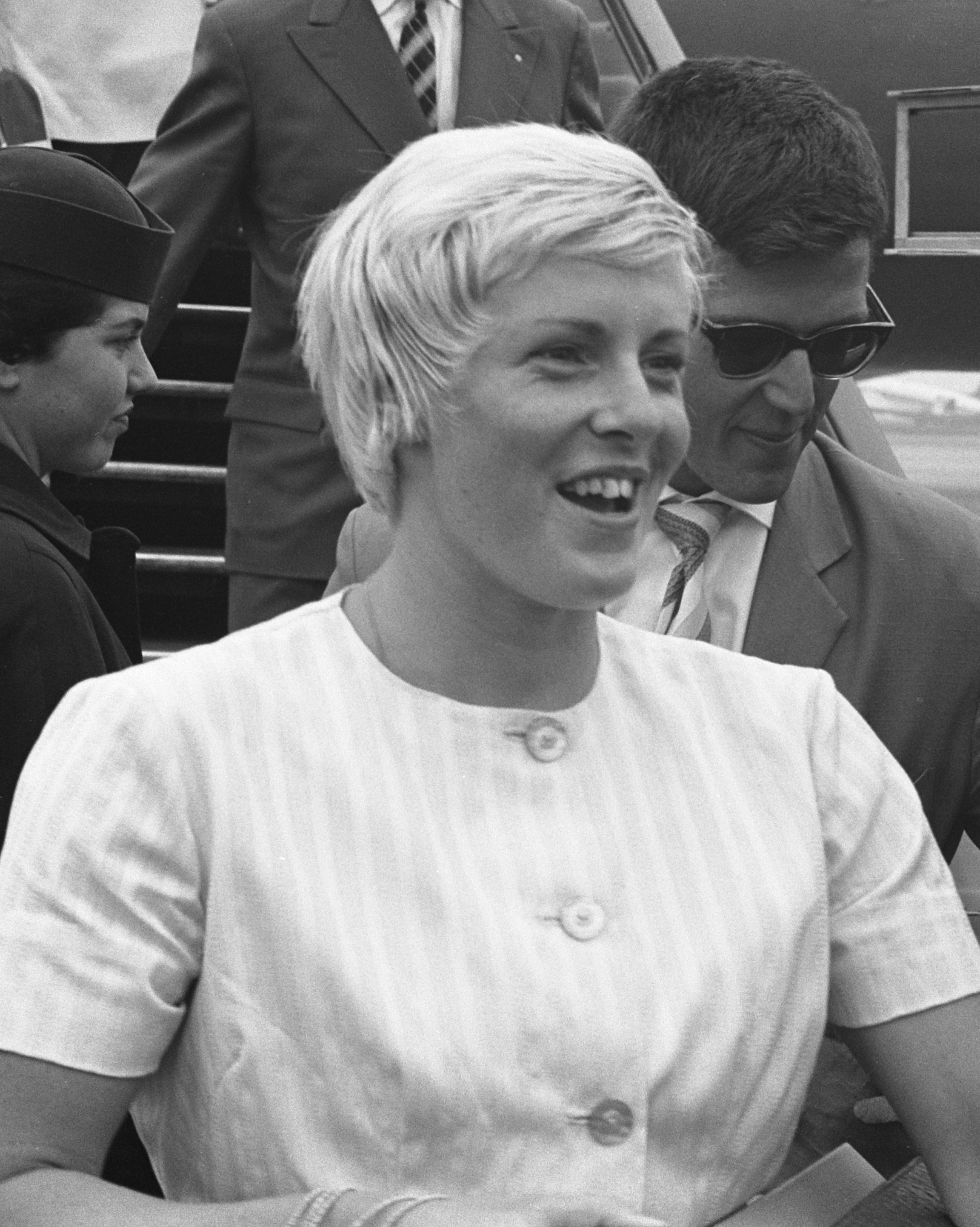
Mary Kok, 1961

- de Looper brothers, Henk (1912–2006) and Jan (1914–1987). Dutch field hockey players and bronze medallists at the 1936 Summer Olympics
- Nel van Vliet (1926–2006), a breaststroke swimmer, gold medallist at the 1948 Summer Olympics
- Roel Wiersma (1932–1995), a Dutch footballer, 316 club caps with PSV Eindhoven
- Geertje Wielema (1934–2009), a freestyle and backstroke swimmer, silver medallist at the 1952 Summer Olympics
- Hermsen brothers, Henk (1937–2022)), André (born 1942) and Wim (born 1947), water polo players
- Mary Kok (born 1940), a renowned Dutch swimmer
- Adrie Lasterie (1943–1991), a Dutch swimmer, silver medallist at the 1964 Summer Olympics
- Evert Kroon (1946–2018), water polo goalkeeper, bronze medallist at the 1976 Summer Olympics
- nl:John van Altena (born 1947), 107 caps, Dutch National Rugby XV
- Ton van Klooster (born 1954), freestyle swimmer and swimming coach, competed at the 1972 Summer Olympics
- Nico Landeweerd (born 1954), water polo player, bronze medallist at the 1976 Summer Olympics
- Dennis Higler (born 1985), FIFA football referee
- Andy Hoepelman (born 1955), water polo player, bronze medallist at the 1976 Summer Olympics
- Albert Voorn (born 1956), a Dutch equestrian and silver medallist at the 2000 Summer Olympics
- Alex Boegschoten (born 1956), a former water polo player, bronze medallist at the 1976 Summer Olympics
- Hansje Bunschoten (born 1958–2017), swimmer and TV presenter, competed at the 1972 Summer Olympics
- Ellen Bontje (born 1958), equestrian, team medallist at the 1992 and 2000 Summer Olympics
- Reggie de Jong (born 1964), freestyle swimmer, bronze medallist at the 1980 Summer Olympics
- Jelle Goes (born 1970), a Dutch football manager
- Pieta van Dishoeck (born 1972), a retired rower, won two medals at the 2000 Summer Olympics
- Davy Klaassen (born 1993), a Dutch professional footballer with 180 club caps
- Azor Matusiwa (born 1998), a Dutch professional footballer for Ipswich Town Football Club

== Gallery ==
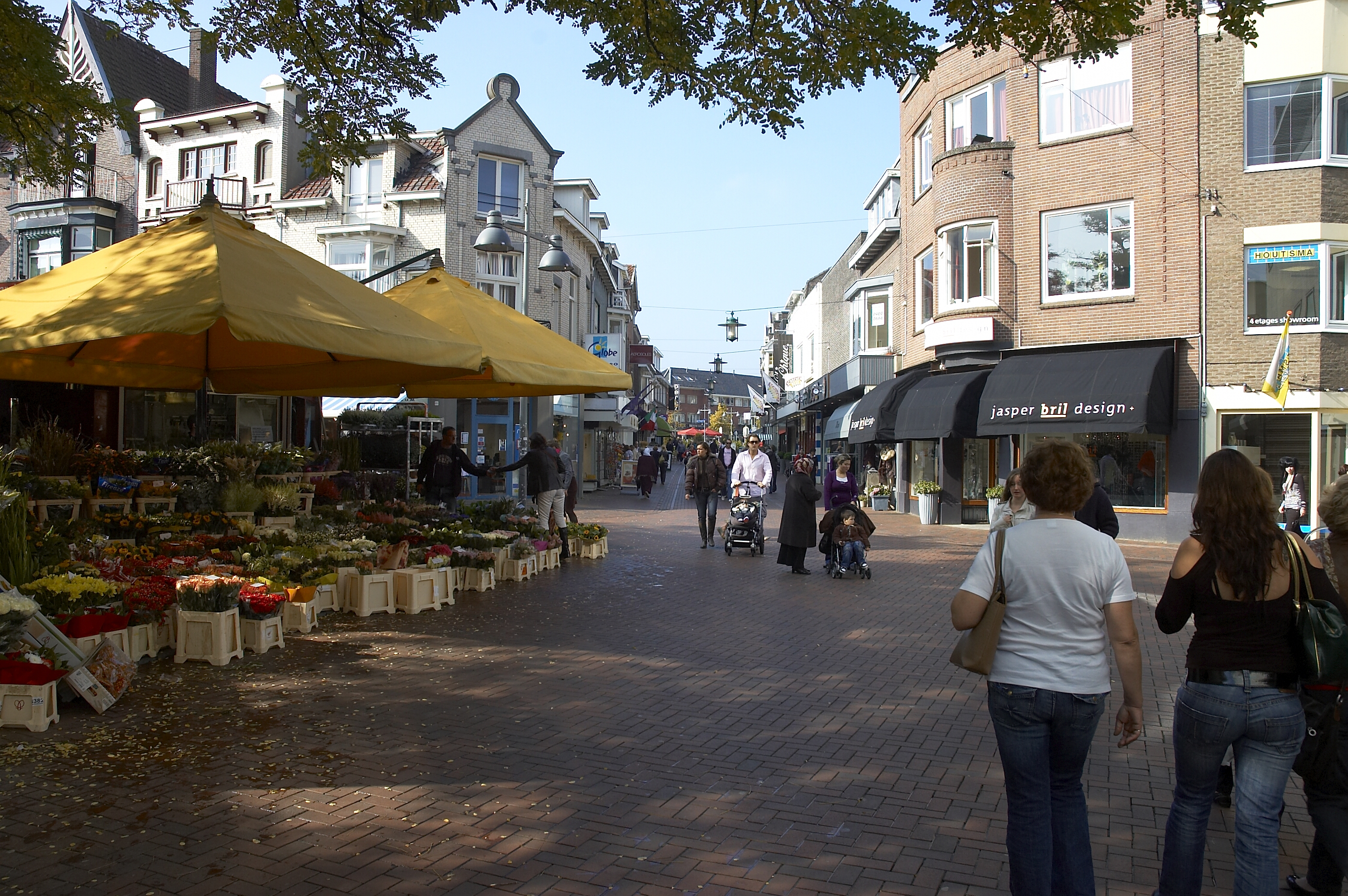
Hilversum city centre

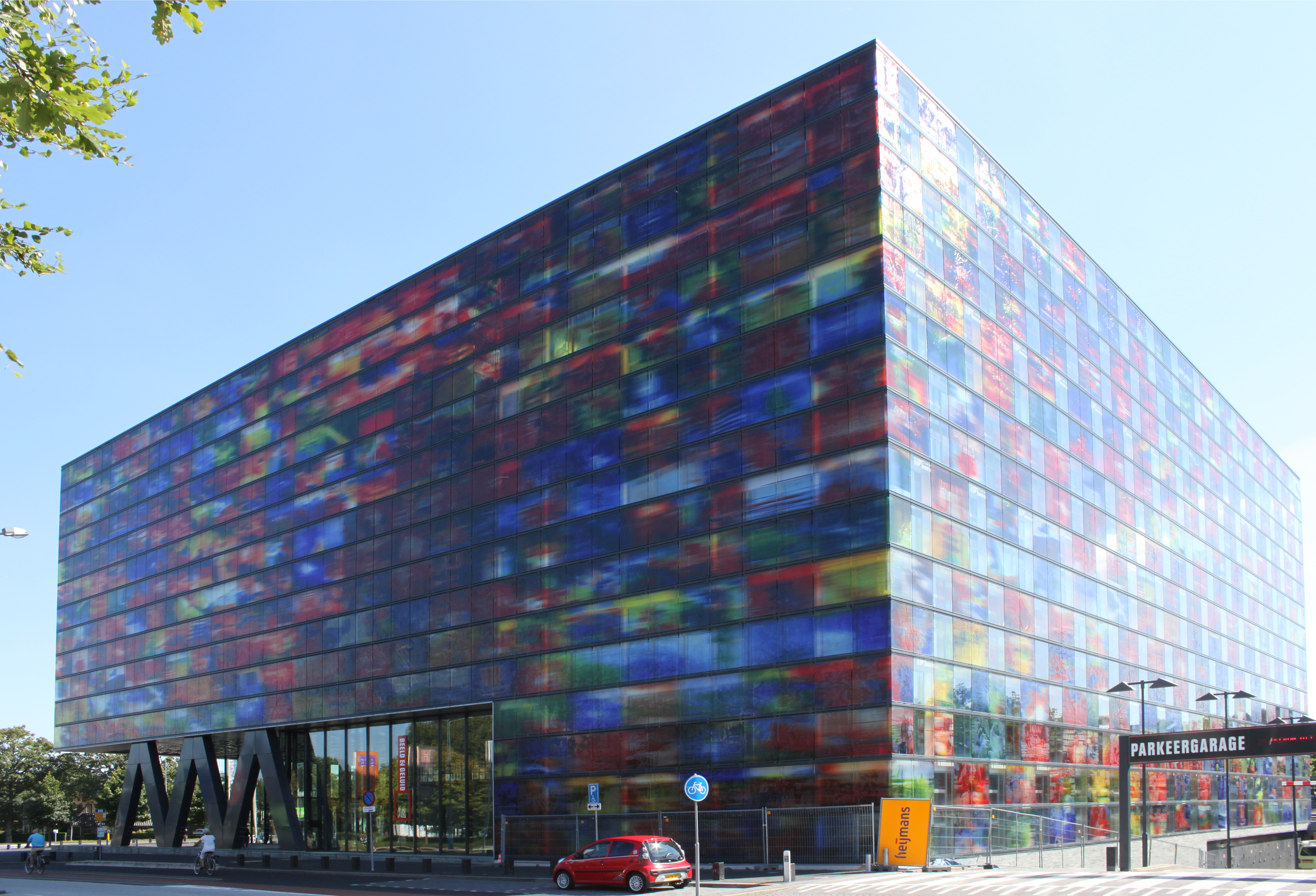
Sound and Vision (Nederlands Instituut voor Beeld en Geluid)

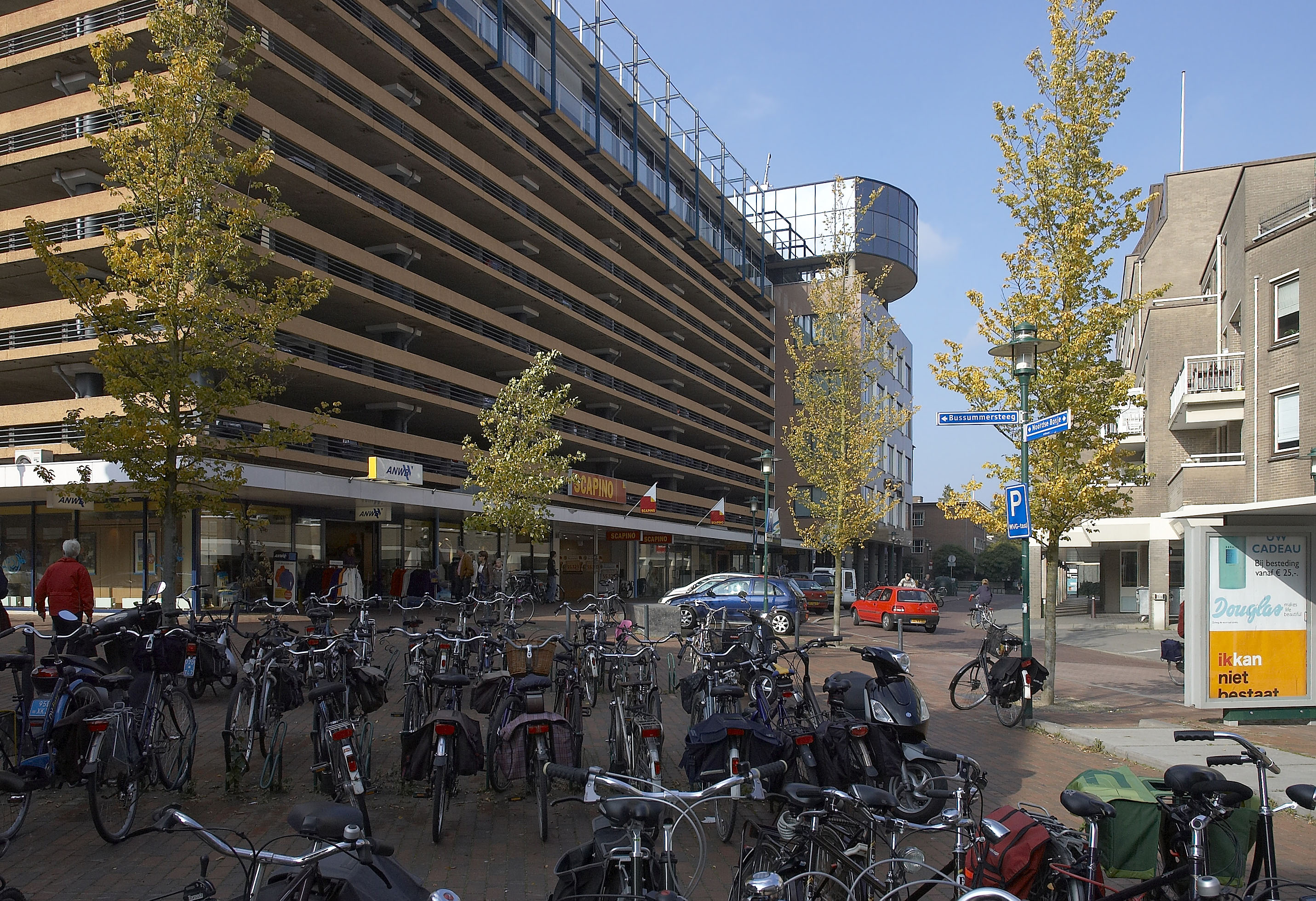
Shopping district Noordse Bosje

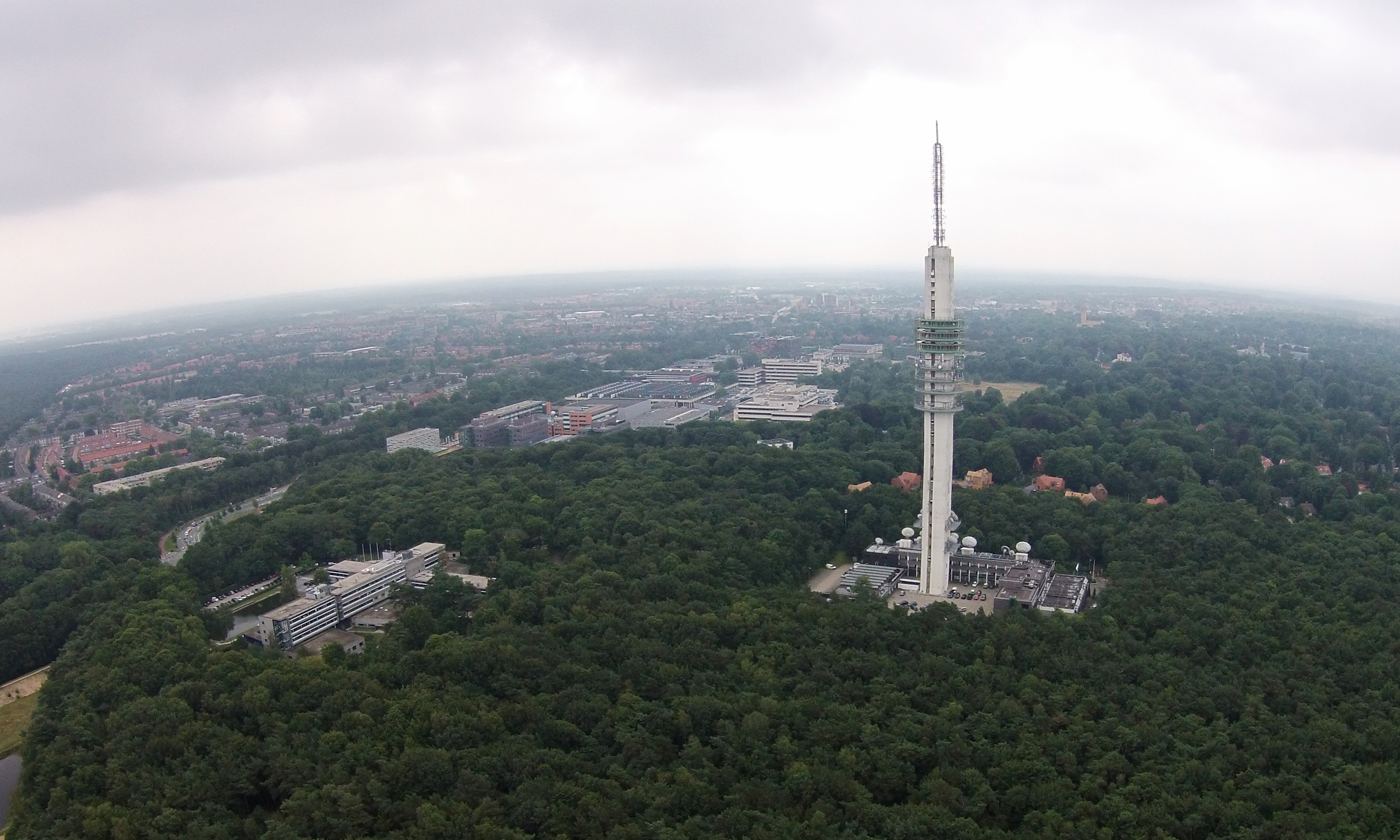
Media Park, Hilversum

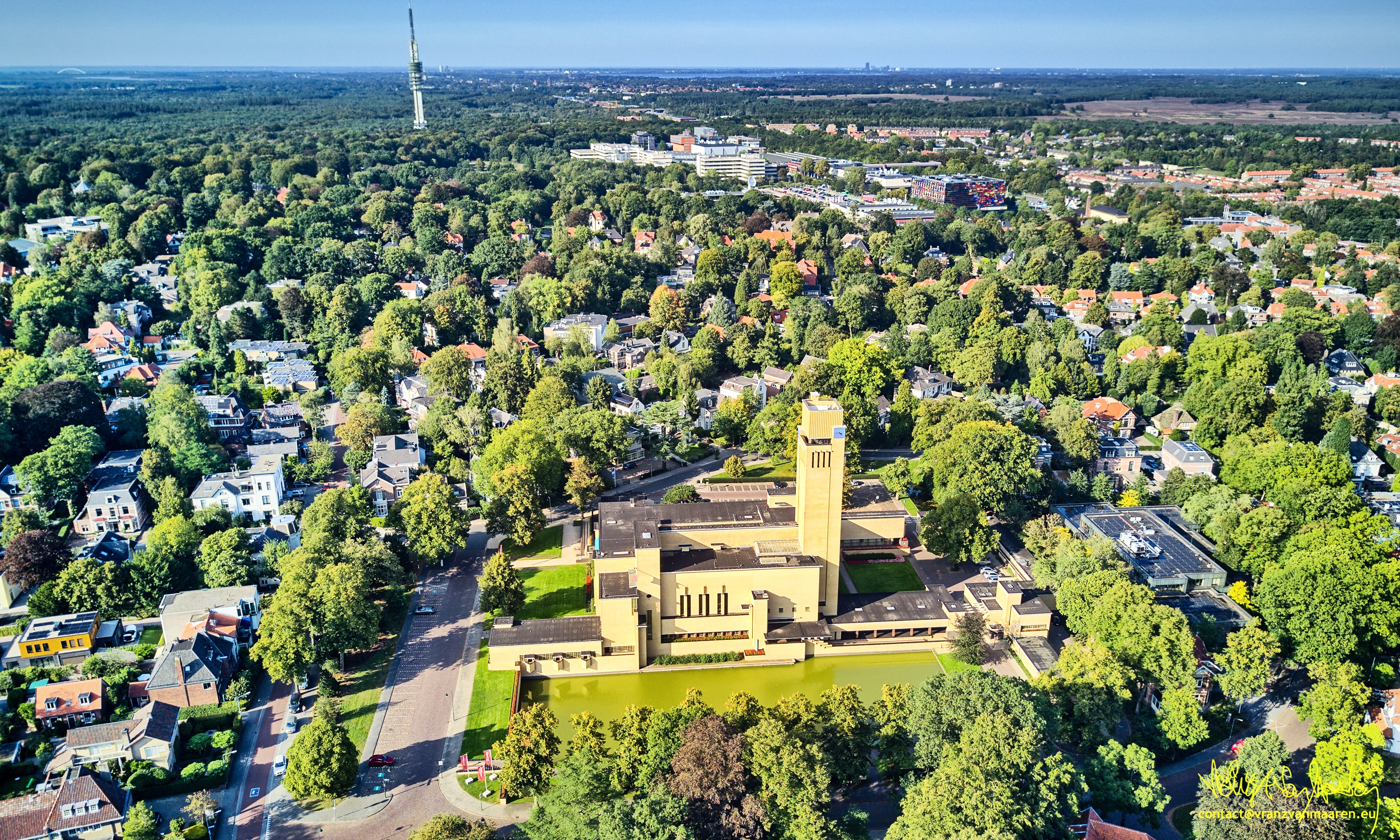
2020-08-19 Drone Shot Raadhuis and Media Park, Hilversum

== See also ==
- Gemeentelijk Gymnasium Hilversum
