= Raymond Couraud =

French soldier and gangster

- Born: 12 January 1920; Surgères, Charente-Maritime, France
- Died: 1977 (aged 56–57)
- Relatives: Mary Jayne Gold (lover)
- Military career
- Allegiance: France
- Branch: French Army; Free French Forces
- Service years: 1938–1944
- Rank: Captain
- Nickname: Jack William Raymond Lee
- Units: French Foreign Legion; French Resistance; Bureau Central de Renseignements et d'Action; Special Operations Executive; Special Air Service
- Conflicts: World War II; Battles of Narvik; Battle of France; St Nazaire Raid; Operation Slapstick; Operation Gaff
- Awards: Croix de Guerre with palm, 1939–45: Norwegian War Medal; Military Cross; Africa Star; Italy Star; France and Germany Star; Defence Medal; War Medal 1939–45 with Star

Raymond Couraud (aka Captain Jack William Raymond Lee, born 12 January 1920 at Surgères, Charente-Maritime – 1977), was a French soldier and gangster, who through his World War II military exploits became a highly decorated member of the French-section of the British Army's Special Air Service.

== Biography ==
Couraud was born 12 January 1920 at Surgères, Charente-Maritime, France. Little is known of his early life, or education.

=== French Foreign Legion ===
On 19 March 1938, Couraud joined the French Foreign Legion under his real name, but with a birth date of 12 January 1916 in Namur, Belgium. This would have made him 22 and old enough to join, whereas he was actually just over 18 and too young.

After training, on 3 March 1940, he was assigned to the 5th Company of the 13th Brigade. With this unit he took part in the Battles of Narvik, for which he won the Croix de Guerre with palm, for dislodging two enemy soldiers with a grenade attack:

Expressed to be a volunteer to dislodge two enemies from a cliff that impeded the attack of the unit. A single close grenade killed one and injured the other

Returning to France, Courard found a France in turmoil, in July 1940 he joined retreating French Forces in Fuveau, near Marseille. After the unit was decimated in action, while trying to reach England, Couraud was captured and imprisoned in August 1940 at Fort Saint Nicolas. Acquitted before a military tribunal in December 1940, he was released by the Vichy government.

=== Marseille and Mary Jayne Gold ===
On release, Couraud joined the new French economy by becoming a gangster, arranging importation, trading, distribution and export of illegal goods and people. It was through this activity that he was introduced to American socialite Mary Jayne Gold, who had chosen to relocate from Paris to the new Vichy controlled area, over returning home.

In Marseilles, Gold met American art student Miriam Davenport, and American journalist and intellect Varian Fry, who had come to France on a personal mission to help members of Europe's intellectual and artistic community escape the Nazi threat. The three became the core of a volunteer group who sheltered artistic refugees, and through Couraud organized their escape through the mountains to Spain, or smuggling them aboard freighters sailing to North Africa, or ports in North or South America.

Through the organisation, Couraud and Gold started a relationship. Gold helped subsidize the organisation, which is credited with the rescue of over 2,000 refugees, among whom were: sculptor Jacques Lipchitz; artist Marc Chagall; writer Hannah Arendt; Nobel Prize winner Otto Meyerhof.

While Gold remained in Marseille until Autumn 1941, in April 1941 Couraud crossed the Pyrenees with the aim of reporting to the British Consulate in Barcelona. Arrested at Madrid railway station, he was interned for four months in Miranda. Meanwhile, due to criminal activity and associated smuggling of people, he was sentenced by a military court in Marseille to 10 years in prison.

=== SOE: Jack William Raymond Lee ===
On arrival in England on 12 October 1941, Couraud joined the Free French Forces. He was immediately assigned to the Action militaire section of the Bureau Central de Renseignements et d'Action (English: Central Bureau of Intelligence and Operations; commonly referred as just BCRA), the World War II era forerunner of the SDECE French intelligence service.

Couraud was assigned to Colonel Maurice Buckmaster's section of the Special Operations Executive, which covered all of France. After specialist training, in December 1941, Couraud was commissioned as second-Lieutenant Jack William Raymond Lee. Name changes were not uncommon during the war, as various people and particularly criminals tried to hide their past while fighting what they saw as a true fight.

=== St Nazaire Raid ===
In January to February 1942, Couraud continued his SOE training with a combination of formal courses, including parachuting; to night training on British Southcoast beaches, and reconnaissance raids on northern French beaches from Normandy to Loire-Atlantique.

On 28 March, Couraud became the only French national to participate in the Lord Mountbatten-led British Commandos raid on St. Nazaire, intended to deny the Tirpitz any base on the Atlantic Ocean. Couraud escaped, but was wounded in both legs. He recovered in Falmouth Hospital from April to July 1942.

Couraud returned to operations with SOE in August 1942, with a beach raid near Cannes. In November 1942, in an operation near Narbonne, he felt obliged to kill three Vichy policemen. Escaping through the Pyrenees, he made his way to Barcelona, and then onwards to Lisbon, Portugal for return to England.

=== 2nd SAS Regiment ===
Because of repeated indiscretions and security breaches throughout the year 1942, Raymond Couraud was dismissed from the S.O.Es in January 1943 but recommended for transfer to a commando unit. He then joined the 62nd Commando under the command of Colonel Bill Stirling, the elder brother of SAS founder Colonel David Stirling. Assigned to Stirling's No. 62 Commando, the unit later became 2nd regiment of SAS, a designated Small Scale Raiding Force. Based at the regimental HQ in Philippeville, Algeria, over the following 14 months the group undertook various raids into occupied Europe and North Africa:

- Ousseltia front
- Airports in southern Tunisia, with 21 aircraft destroyed on the ground at Metlaoui
- Sea born operation on the Galite Islands
- Sea born operation on Lampedusa
- Submarine operation on airfields in Sardinia

=== SAS, French 2nd Squadron ===
In March 1943, after a meeting General Alphonse Juin, Stirling took 50 French soldiers out of 2 SAS to form the 2 SAS, French 2nd Squadron under Couraud, under his new title of Captain Lee. The squadron consisted of Couraud as captain and commander, three British lieutenants, two French officers (Lieutenant Robert Sablet, Raillard and Aspiring), and French soldiers, with a large proportion of former Legionnaires. In May 1943, taking advantage of the Churchill Act of 1940, Couraud took British citizenship.

In September 1943, in Operation Slapstick the Allied assault on Taranto, French 2nd Squadron undertook initial reconnaissance. After the landings, they destroyed a large Wehrmacht convoy in the area of Chieti, and then harassed German units as they withdrew to Sangro via the advancing front. After further raids and operations on the Italian mainland, in April 1944 the unit withdrew for recuperation in Scotland.

=== Operation Gaff ===
After Couraud returned to the UK, he was commanded to set up a specialist six-man assassination unit in preparation for D-Day and the Invasion of Europe, which would target high-ranking Nazi Wehrmacht staff.

From March 1943, British Intelligence had been trying to find Field Marshal Erwin Rommel's headquarters in France. Part of the brief looked at creating a timetable for Rommel, to assess how easy it would be to kill him. Much as though he had been against the plan pre-D-Day, with manpower losses escalating Field Marshal Bernard Montgomery approved the plan post D-Day, even though they still didn't know where Rommel's base was. In a bizarre coincidence, on 9 June SAS Lieutenant General was heading for a meeting with a French Resistance unit. Resting in a barn, he was approached by a man who lived in La Roche-Guyon, asking for assurances that as Rommel's headquarters was in the village, that the Royal Air Force would not bomb them.

On learning of the location of Rommel's HQ, Couraud and his unit were moved to a flat in London, to wait for a storm to pass and be parachuted into Orléans. Arriving on 18 July, the team radioed in, but found that Rommel had been severely injured the previous day after his staff car had been over turned in an attack by RAF Hawker Typhoons, and replaced by Günther von Kluge.

Couraud and his team orders regarding Rommel were aborted, and they moved toward advancing US Army lines on foot, while ambushing trains and attacking German units along their route. After an attack on the German Command at Mantes, Couraud disguised as a policeman made his way through the judicial police of Pontchartrain, and joined the American 3rd Army of General George S. Patton on 12 August.

=== Post August 1944 ===
After Operation Gaff, Couraud was assigned as second in command of 2 SAS under Roy Farran. Split into two teams starting from Orléans and Rennes, the teams met up near Langres, where they built an SAS field operations base.

Returning to England in September 1944, with the liberation of France, Couraud left the British Army in December 1944. He returned to France to become part of the French Army General Staff.

== Later memorial ==
In Mary Jayne Gold's autobiography, Crossroads Marseille, Couraud is referred to as "Killer", due to his murdering of the English language.
