= Justus Rosenberg =

Literary scholar and member of the French Resistance (1921–2021)

Justus Rosenberg (January 23, 1921 – October 30, 2021) was a literature professor who spent most of his life teaching in the United States, ending his career as a professor emeritus of languages and literature at Bard College. Before that, as a teenager he began playing a role in saving many lives when the Nazis overran France, working first as part of a French-American network organized to help anti-Nazi intellectuals and artists escape from Vichy France to the United States, and later as a member of the French Resistance during World War II, providing assistance as well to the US Army.

== Personal life ==
Rosenberg was born in the Free City of Danzig on January 23, 1921. He came from a Jewish home where his Polish-born parents also spoke both German and Yiddish. After witnessing violent antisemitism in Danzig along with the Nazi expulsion of Jewish students from local schools, his parents sent him to study in Paris. He was 16 when he left his father, Jacob, a successful businessman, and his mother, Bluma (née Solarsky), a homemaker; he was reunited with them and his sister only in the 1950s. In 1997 he married Karin Kraft, whom he had known since the 1980s.

With his wife he founded the Justus and Karin Rosenberg Foundation to fight hate in general and antisemitism in particular.

He did not talk about his wartime experiences until the Shoah Foundation interviewed him in 1998 as a witness to and survivor of the Holocaust. In 2020 he published his autobiography, The Art of Resistance: My Four Years in the French Underground: A Memoir.

He turned 100 on January 23, 2021, and died on October 30.

== World War II ==
When it became too dangerous for Rosenberg to stay in Paris, he moved south, ending up in Marseille, having followed Miriam Davenport there when she recruited him to join Varian Fry's Emergency Rescue Committee, a network formed to extract artists and intellectuals from Vichy France. He was then seventeen.

The Committee helped such figures as Hannah Arendt, Marcel Duchamp, Marc Chagall, Max Ernst, and André Breton to escape; Rosenberg personally accompanied Heinrich Mann and Franz Werfel, along with their wives Nelly Mann and Alma Mahler-Werfel, on foot across the Pyrenees to Spain.

His first roles with the group were office boy and courier, carrying messages and forged identity papers to those the group was trying to save. “I looked very blond, very Germanic and younger than my own age, so I wouldn’t be stopped often to be asked for papers, because I looked so innocent and angelic,” he told the International Rescue Committee in an interview. He also spoke fluent French and German.

After Fry's network had to shut down its activities in France (it later became part of the International Rescue Committee), Rosenberg was picked up for transport to a camp in Poland but managed to escape and join the French Resistance. During this time he was again a courier but also actively participated in armed attacks on the enemy. Once the US Army had landed in France, he was attached to the 636th Tank Destroyer Battalion, and suffered a serious injury when a jeep he was in hit a land mine. In addition to acting as a guide, his ability to speak German was useful to the Army, as he sometimes interrogated German-speaking prisoners.

For his wartime service, Justus received a Bronze Star and a Purple Heart. In 2017 the French ambassador to the United States personally made Rosenberg a Commandeur in the Légion d’Honneur, among France's highest decorations, for his heroism during World War II.

== Academic career ==
Immediately after the war Rosenberg worked at a United Nations camp for displaced persons, before studying at the Sorbonne. In 1946 he obtained a preferential visa and emigrated to the United States. He earned his PhD at the University of Cincinnati in 1950, and held post-docs at Columbia University and Syracuse University before obtaining positions at Swarthmore College, The New School, and Bard College. He taught at Bard from 1962 until he retired.

His linguistic skills led to teaching language courses in French, German, Russian, Yiddish, and Polish at Swarthmore as well as Bard. At Bard he affiliated with the programs in French and Jewish studies, as well as literature, and taught traditional literature courses on such subjects as classic 19th century French, Russian, and German literature, as well as popular compilation courses, for example, one entitled "10 Plays that Shook the World." After his retirement, he continued teaching, broadening his subject matter to include modern literature from Africa, the Middle East, India, and Asia; at The New School he taught a weekly course in political and cultural history.

He published many scholarly works on French and German literature along with linguistic subjects, especially to do with translation. He was invited as a guest professor at universities at various European universities as well as in Singapore, and received many honors including one from the New York Council for the Humanities.
