= Varian's War =

2001 film

- Theatrical release poster
- Written by: Lionel Chetwynd
- Directed by: Lionel Chetwynd
- Starring: William Hurt; Julia Ormond; Matt Craven; Maury Chaykin; Alan Arkin; Lynn Redgrave
- Music by: Neil Smolar
- Countries of origin: Canada; United Kingdom; United States
- Original language: English

Production
- Producers: Michael Deakin; Kevin Tierney
- Cinematography: Daniel Jobin
- Editor: Denis Papillon
- Running time: 121 minutes
- Production companies: Ardent Productions; Ardglasson Productions; Barwood Films; Gryphon Productions; NewShowtime

Original release
- Network: Showtime
- Release: April 21, 2001

Varian's War (aka Varian's War: The Forgotten Hero) is a 2001 joint Canadian/American/United Kingdom film made-for-television drama. The film was written and directed by Lionel Chetwynd, based on the life and wartime exploits of Varian Fry who saved more than 2,000 Jewish artists from Vichy France, the conquered ally of Nazi Germany. Varian's War stars William Hurt, heading an all-star ensemble cast of Julia Ormond, Matt Craven, Maury Chaykin, Alan Arkin and Lynn Redgrave.

== Plot ==
While in Berlin during Kristallnacht in 1938, journalist Varian Fry witnesses the Nazis' brutal treatment of Jews. He was helpless and physically sick as the SA brown-shirts clubbed their victims to the ground. The experience left him with a resolve to do something to help the Jews.

Back in the United States, Fry begins to canvass his influential friends and acquaintances, only to find indifference or even antisemitism. Learning that the Nazis have targeted artists and intelligentsia, he approaches the State Department with a plan and a few prominent names, such as artist Marc Chagall, scrawled on a list. When the State Department tries to block his plans to head back to Europe, Fry finds an ally in First Lady Eleanor Roosevelt, who intervenes on his behalf. She specifically asks Fry to check on Lion Feuchtwanger, imprisoned without charge by the French in the Camp des Milles internment camp.

In 1940, heading for Marseille in Vichy France – the nominally unoccupied zone libre in the southern part of Nazi-conquered metropolitan France, where he knows that Jewish artists have taken refuge – Fry arrives with money to bribe officials.

While U.S. Consul Jamieson is intransigent and rude to him, Fry later learns that Vice Consul Harry Bingham is an ally, as Bingham has worked with Waitstill and Martha Sharp, taking Feuchtwanger, Hannah Arendt, and Marc and Bella Chagall into his own home. The Chagalls, like many other expatriates, believe they are safe in Vichy France, willfully ignoring the article in the terms of the French surrender stating that France must immediately hand over any French citizen that the Nazis should demand. Word spreads quickly in Marseille that an American will help Jews to escape Vichy France. In setting up an office out of his hotel room, Fry encounters Miriam Davenport, who helps him screen the numerous refugees that begin lining up at his hotel.

Two other accomplices approach Fry, Albert Hirschman, a Jewish con-man that he names "Beamish", and Bill Freier, a counterfeit expert. With picture-perfect forged passes and identification cards, Fry begins to send Jewish artists out of France to Spain where they can arrange transport to the United States. Both French and German officials suspect that Fry is deceitful and assign agents, such as Nazi SS Oberstleutnant Marius Franken, to follow him.

With French collaborators turning in Jews, an urgency to leave begins to take hold. Even Chagall now joins with author Heinrich Mann and others in seeking passage out of Marseille. Fry and Davenport decide to shepherd a large group of frightened refugees, first on a train, then taking the group on a long hike through a mountain forest to a checkpoint where, if their documents will be accepted, they will be free to enter neutral Spain. Despite some near misses, the group makes it to freedom.

In just under one year, ending with his expulsion in September 1941, Fry's clandestine underground escape route over the Pyrenees eventually frees more than 2,000 artists, authors, scientists and intellectuals from Vichy France, including some who are listed onscreen in the background of the closing credits: Chagall, Arendt, Jacques Lipchitz, Hans Bellmer, Heinrich Mann, André Masson, Max Ernst, Franz Werfel, Ferdinand Springer and Feuchtwanger.

== Cast ==
- William Hurt as Varian Fry
- Julia Ormond as Miriam Davenport
- Matt Craven as Beamish (Albert Hirschman)
- Maury Chaykin as Marcello
- Alan Arkin as Bill Freier
- Lynn Redgrave as Alma Werfel-Mahler
- Rémy Girard as Colonel Joubert (credited as Remy Girard)
- Christopher Heyerdahl as Marius Franken
- Gloria Carlin as Bella Chagall
- Joel Miller as Marc Chagall
- Vlasta Vrana as Franz Werfel
- John Dunn-Hill as Heinrich Mann
- Ted Whittall as Harry" Bingham (Note: Despite "official" reluctance to assist refugees, Vice-Counsel Hiram Bingham IV worked closely with Varian Fry to shelter Jews and help them escape from Marseille.)
- Dorothée Berryman as Mme Fanny

== Production ==
Producers of Varian's War included Barwood Film's chief executive, Barbra Streisand and Cis Corman, along with Prince Edward, Duke of Edinburgh, the head of Ardent Productions. The trio acted as executive producers in their first and only collaboration.

Varian's War was filmed entirely in Montreal with principal photography beginning on May 3, 2000 and having wrapped by June 14, 2000. Additional exteriors and studio shots at Audio Cine Films Inc. took place over August–September 2000. In filming in Canada, a large Canadian supporting cast was assembled that included Christopher Heyerdahl, Remy Girard, Gloria Carlin, Dorothee Berryman as a brothel madame, Pascale Montpetit, Vlasta Vrana, Joel Miller, Maury Chaykin and Aubert Pallascio.

== Historical accuracy ==
When released, Varian's War was advertised as "The true story of the American Schindler", a claim that was roundly decried as inaccurate by historians. Although loosely based on the life of Varian Fry, the film received a Hollywood treatment, merging characters and over dramatizing events. Bill Bingham, the son of Hiram Bingham IV, commented: "The film is dreadfully inaccurate and demeaning to Fry, Feuchtwanger, Miriam Davenport and others, despite the apparent desire to honor them."

== Reception ==
Varian's War was telecast on Showtime television network on April 21, 2001 to mainly negative reviews. Darryl Miller of the Los Angeles Times wrote: "Noble intentions aside, Varian's War ... is a mess of a movie that leaves viewers with more questions than answers about Varian Fry ... Clumsily constructed and hollowly acted, it's a project that its lead performers – William Hurt and Julia Ormond – along with Barbra Streisand's Barwood Films, should quickly try to bury in their resumes ... Writer-director Lionel Chetwynd fudges a lot of facts, beginning with the implication that Fry founded the Emergency Rescue Committee. Chetwynd also plays fast and loose with depictions of the supporting characters, including Fry's associate, Miriam Davenport (Ormond), and the writer Lion Feuchtwanger."

The Washington Post reported that Weekly Standard columnist Fred Barnes was so impressed with Varian's War that he sent a video copy to White House aide Karl Rove, and subsequently, with Rove raving about the film, a special screening was arranged for President George W. Bush. "... written and directed by Brit-turned-American Lionel Chetwynd and starring William Hurt as Varian Fry, a Harvard-educated American journalist who rescued 2,000 artists and intellectuals from Nazi-occupied France ..." Hurt's co-stars, Julia Ormond and Lynn Redgrave, Chetwynd and his wife, actress Gloria Carlin, were in attendance. (Note: Chetwynd was called the "dean of the Hollywood conservatives".)

After broadcast by the Showtime Networks/Showtime Entertainment, Varian's War was also released internationally as Varian’s War: A Forgotten Hero by Alliance Atlantis Communications.

== Awards ==
At the 2001 WorldFest Houston film festival, Lionel Chetwynd won the Gold Special Jury Award (Best Director), while at the 2002 Satellite Awards, Julie Ormand won for Best Performance by an Actress in a Supporting Role in a Miniseries or a Motion Picture Made for Television while Varian's War won as the Best Motion Picture Made for Television. William Hurt was also nominated for Best Performance by an Actor in a Miniseries or a Motion Picture Made for Television.

Other nominations included Nicoletta Massone for Best Achievement in Costume Design at the 2002 Genie Awards and Lionel Chetwynd was nominated for the WGA Award (TV) in Original Long Form for the 2002 Writers Guild of America Awards.

== See also ==
- Schindler's List (1993)
