= Mary Jayne Gold =

American heiress and humanitarian

- Born: August 12, 1909; Chicago, Illinois
- Died: October 5, 1997 (aged 88); Gassin, Var, France
- Partner: Raymond Couraud

Mary Jayne Gold (August 12, 1909 – October 5, 1997) was an American heiress who played an important role helping European Jews and intellectuals escape from Nazi-occupied France in 1940–41, during World War II. Many had fled there in preceding years from Germany, where oppression had mounted.

== Early years and education ==
Gold was born in the Chicago suburb of Evanston, Illinois to Margaret and Egbert H. Gold. Her father owned a business the Vapor Car Heating Company that manufactured radiators and heating systems. The family was very wealthy. Gold was educated at the Masters School at Dobbs Ferry, New York and a finishing school in Italy.

In the 1930s, her monied background enabled her to enjoy the vibrant social scene in London and Paris. Piloting her own airplane, she traveled around Europe, spending her time at luxury hotels, skiing at the best resorts in the Alps, and socializing with the elite of the day. By the time war broke out in 1939, she was living in Paris.

== During World War II ==
Gold was living in a Paris apartment in 1940 when France fell to the onslaught of the German army. She fled to the Mediterranean seaport of Marseille which, although not Nazi occupied, was under the control of the collaborationist Vichy regime. In Marseille she met Miriam Davenport, an American art student; and Varian Fry, an American journalist and intellectual. Acting as a representative of the Emergency Rescue Committee, formed in New York in 1940, Fry was to assist Jewish and anti-Nazi artists and intellectuals in leaving France. He had $3,000 and a short list of refugees, mostly Jews, under imminent threat of arrest by agents of the Gestapo. Other anti-Nazi writers, avant-garde artists, musicians and hundreds of others desperately seeking any chance to escape France came to his door. In the 1940 armistice agreement between Germany and defeated France, France had agreed to "surrender on demand" refugees to the Nazis.

Instead of returning to the United States, Gold chose to remain in France. She joined Fry and Davenport, along with other volunteers, in sheltering refugees and organizing their escape through the mountains to Spain and neutral Portugal, or by smuggling them aboard freighters sailing to either North Africa or ports in North or South America. She was helped in part by Raymond Couraud, a French Foreign Legionnaire who had become a local gangster after returning to France, and her lover. Gold helped subsidize the ERC operation, which is credited with participating in the rescue of some 2,000 refugees. Among the escapees were notables such as the sculptor Jacques Lipchitz, artist Marc Chagall, writer Hannah Arendt, and physician and biochemist Otto Meyerhof, a Nobel Prize winner.

The Vichy government had been monitoring Fry's activities and arrested him in the fall of 1941, forcing him to return to the United States. About then, Gold was also forced to leave France, and returned to the US. Couraud escaped through Spain and went to England, where he became a war hero in the Special Air Service.

== After the war ==
After the war, Gold maintained an apartment in New York City but lived primarily in a house she had built in the village of Gassin, Var, not far from Saint-Tropez. In 1980, she published a memoir about her wartime experiences, Crossroads Marseilles, 1940. The memoir was published by Doubleday and translated into French in 2001 by Alice Seelow. Mary Jayne Gold's literary estate was left to Pierre Sauvage.

Gold never married and had no children. She died of pancreatic cancer on October 5, 1997, at her villa in Gassin, France. She was interred at Pilgrim Home Cemetery in Michigan.

Her niece, Alison Leslie Gold, was a well-known author of books on the Holocaust, known for Anne Frank Remembered: The Story of the Woman Who Helped Hide the Frank Family (1987), which was co-written with Miep Gies.

== Representation in other media ==
- Julie Orringer's historical novel, The Flight Portfolio (2019), explores the figures and work of the Emergency Rescue Committee, including Gold's life and experiences in Marseilles. It integrates fictional elements with historic persons and events.
- This novel was adapted as a limited television series, Transatlantic (2023), produced and streamed by Netflix. It stars Gillian Jacobs as Gold, Cory Michael Smith as Varian Fry and Lucas Englander as Albert Hirschman. The series includes a short documentary about the making of the program, with comments by actors, producers and directors.
- Meg Waite Clayton's historical novel, The Postmistress of Paris (2021), is a fictionalized version of Gold's story, similar in plot (often scene-for-scene) with Transatlantic, but with "Mary Jayne" replaced by "Nanée" and some other characters also using fictionalized names.

== Published work ==
Crossroads Marseilles, 1940 (1980) OCLC 606049313
