= Fred Stein =

German photographer

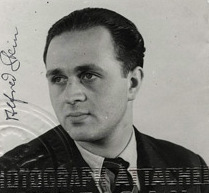
- Stein in 1941
- Born: July 3, 1909; Dresden, Germany
- Died: September 27, 1967 (aged 58); New York City, United States
- Education: University of Leipzig, University of Heidelberg
- Occupation: Photographer
- Children: Peter Stein, Ruth Marion Gutierrez (Mimi)
- Website: www.fredstein.com

Fred Stein (July 3, 1909 – September 27, 1967) was a street photographer in Paris and New York. He captured spontaneous scenes from life, but was also a portraitist, photographing many of the great personalities of the 20th century.

== Career ==
=== Early life and background ===
Stein was born on July 3, 1909, in Dresden, Germany. His father, Dr. Leopold Stein, was rabbi of the Dresden Conservative community. He died when Stein was six, and his mother, Eva Wollheim Stein, became a religion teacher. Though their circumstances were reduced, his mother encouraged his intellectual and artistic education by enrolling him in good schools and subscribing to the many museums in Dresden, which Stein "haunted as a youth" (as he later said). Stein was bright and twice skipped grades at the Gymnasium (secondary school), a rare occurrence in those days. He was also intellectually curious and read extensively. At sixteen he joined the Socialist Youth of Germany – The Falcons. He was active in the anti-Nazi movement.

He decided to become a public defender out of a concern for the plight of the poorest citizens, and attended law school at the University of Leipzig, from which he graduated after three years, in 1933. He worked in the State Prosecutors Office of Dresden as a prerequisite for obtaining his lawyer's certification. Three weeks before he was to receive the German equivalent of admission to the bar, he was dismissed by the Nazi government for "racial and political reasons", and was forbidden as a Jew to use the public library, halting the work on his PhD thesis.

In January 1933, when Hitler came to power, Stein's anti-Nazi activity became more committed. Dresden was a scene of a particularly strong Fascist crackdown, and arrests were increasingly common. Yet Stein continued to give lectures and to ride around on his bike, distributing Anti-Nazi literature in the streets.

=== Escape from Germany ===
In August 1933, Stein married Liselotte (Lilo) Salzburg, the daughter of an eminent Jewish physician. Guards at the Justice of the Peace greeted them with "Heil Hitler" salutes. Working as a law consultant in a factory, the only job available to him at this point, Stein received a clandestine warning one night from the son of the factory owner. The SS were asking questions about him, and one of the other workers in the factory had been arrested that day and put into prison. A close friend had written, urging them to come to Paris, and they left the next day under the pretext of a honeymoon trip.

=== Paris ===
Paris in the 1930s was a vital art scene. Emigres from all over Europe were drawn there, with new ideas influenced by the new Modernism. Artists drew upon the zeitgeist and upon each other's work, producing a wave of inspired vision. Stein and his wife Lilo lived among a circle of expatriate artists and socialists and philosophers, frequenting the cafes and engaging in long conversation. The Steins were some of the lucky few with an apartment, and there they sheltered refugees and cooked huge meals to feed their friends. Robert Capa's companion Gerda Taro, had a room in their apartment. And a frequent visitor was Willy Brandt, who later (in 1969) became Chancellor of Germany.

Unable to work as a lawyer, Stein took up photography using the first model Leica camera he and his wife had bought each other as a wedding present. He began to explore the streets of Paris, looking and learning. It quickly developed into a passion: shooting every day, and studying whatever photo books he could find at night.

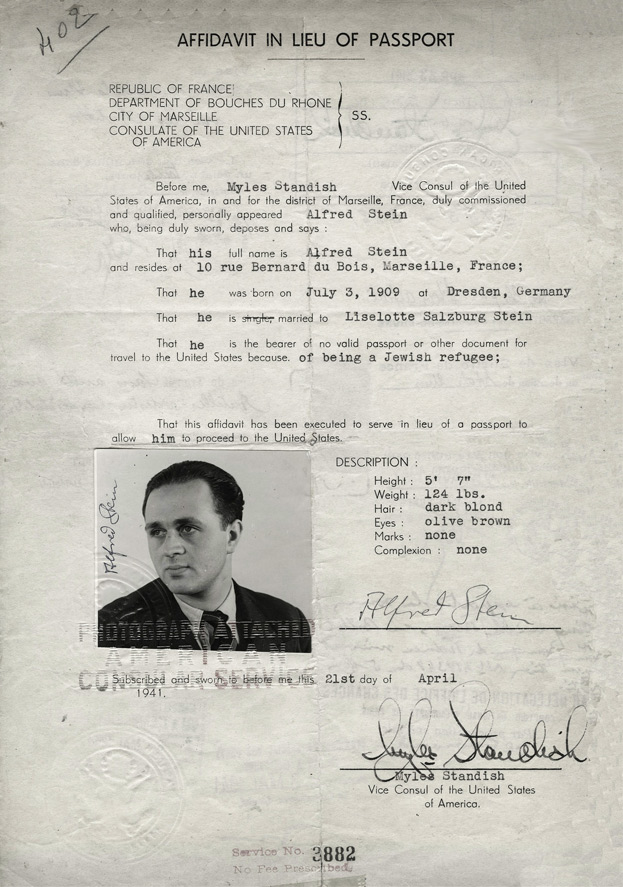
Stein's affidavit in lieu of an American passport, 1941

=== World War II ===
When France declared war on Germany in 1939, Stein was put in an internment camp for enemy aliens near Paris. Later, in the confusion of the Nazis’ approach to Paris, he escaped and made his way south, hiding in isolated farmhouses. He sent word through underground channels to his wife Lilo, alone in now-occupied Paris with their one-year-old girl, to meet him. Posing as a French national, she maneuvered her way through German controls, obtained a safe-conduct, and was reunited with Stein in a secret location. They made their way to Marseille by hiding in the bathrooms of trains. In Marseille they obtained danger visas through the Emergency Rescue Committee. On May 7, 1941, the three boarded the SS Winnipeg, one of the last boats to leave France. They carried only the Leica, some prints, and the negatives.

=== New York City ===
In the freedom of New York City, the energy of the city infused Stein's work. He added the medium-format Rolleiflex, which takes pictures in a square format.

The city's cultural mix fit with his talents and concerns. He took to the streets ranging from Harlem to Fifth Avenue, invigorated by the bustle and variety of the New World. He loved the American spirit; and as an outsider, he approached the various ethnic areas without preconceived ideas. He was able to see in the residents a fresh style, humor and dignity as evidenced in "Little Italy" 1943.

=== Portraits ===
Stein's mobility decreased in the 1950s, and he pursued his growing interest in portraiture. Though he had taken portraits for many years, he had been primarily a street photographer. But now he turned increasingly to the more intellectual aspect of his artistic exploration. He had befriended important writers, artists, scientists, and philosophers through the years. This wide circle of contacts let him to meet people he wished to photograph. When he did not have a personal introduction, he would photograph his subjects, documentary-style, at public appearances.

Part of his technique in portraiture was to thoroughly familiarize himself with his subject's work, so that he might be able to discuss – often to argue about – their oeuvre. This way he hoped to be able to capture a picture of the person with their mind engaged. As he described his approach: "One second is all you have. Like a hunter in search of a target, you look for the one sign that is more characteristic than all the others…the photographer has only one chance, and that one as brief as a split second."

He used natural or minimal lighting, and did not retouch or manipulate the negative. He never used props or dramatic effects to create an "artistic" portrait. His technique can be seen in his photographs of Albert Einstein and Georgia O'Keeffe. Some of his subjects commissioned portraits from him, as with Marc Chagall and Norman Mailer.

When he took his famous portrait of Einstein in 1946 at Princeton, he had been allotted ten minutes of Einstein's time. After the ten minutes were up, Einstein's secretary came in to usher him out. However, Einstein insisted that he stay, saying that their discussion was too interesting to cut short. The secretary came back repeatedly, but the visit extended to two hours. His portrait of Hannah Arendt has also become well known.

=== Death and legacy ===
Stein died in New York City on September 27, 1967, at 58. The archive of his work (Fred Stein Archive) is intact and preserved by his son, cinematographer Peter Stein.

== Collections ==
Stein's work is held in the following permanent public collections:

- Smithsonian American Art Museum, Washington, D.C.
- International Center of Photography, New York
- National Portrait Gallery, Washington, D.C.
- Center for Creative Photography, Tucson, AZ
- Musee Carnavalet, Paris
- Jewish Museum, New York
- Library of Congress, Washington, D.C.
- Museum of Modern Art, New York
- National Portrait Gallery, London
- J. Paul Getty Museum, Los Angeles, CA
- Jewish Museum, Berlin
- Los Angeles County Museum of Art, Los Angeles, CA

== Photography ==
Because of the unobtrusiveness of the 35 mm camera, it was possible to catch "candid" shots of people in a wide variety of settings. The speed of the new camera led to the use of gesture as an expressive element in a composition. This ability to arrest the fleeting moment revealed things that the unaided eye would not notice. It also made night photography practical for the first time. Stein worked extensively with these elements. A good example is Paris Evening, 1934. The couple poised on the streetcorner, surrounded by luminous fog, portend a frame of film noir. They cast a long shadow, echoing the shadow from the building next to which they stand—mysterious, expressing a precarious sense of the world.

The very 'modern' Paris of fashion and design found its way into Stein's artistic vision as a juxtaposition of old and new, such as in the photograph Chez, 1934—a flower vendor, pursuing her ancient trade from a wooden wagon, as her predecessors had for hundreds of years, oblivious to the very modern Chez painted on the wall above her. This juxtaposing of old and new was a theme he worked on consistently in both Paris and New York.

== Publications ==
- Paris. American Relief for France, 1944.
- Fifth Avenue. Pantheon, 1947.
- New York 1948, New York: Lumen, 1948.
- New York 1949. New York: Lumen, 1949.
- Deutsche Portraits. Stuttgart: Ernst Battenbeg, 1961.
- Mer Licht Munich: Ernst Battenberg, 1967.
- World Celebrities in 90 Photographic Portraits by Fred Stein. New York: Dover, 1989. ISBN 0486258432
- Portraits de l'exil: Paris – New York, Photographies de Fred Stein. Paris: Musée du Montparnasse, 2011.
- Fred Stein: Paris New York, Heidelberg: Kehrer, 2013. ISBN 386828429X
- Fred Stein: Dresden – Paris – New York, Dresden: Sandstein Verlag, 2018. ISBN 386828429X
