= Fritz Kahn =

German Jewish physician, writer, and science popularizer

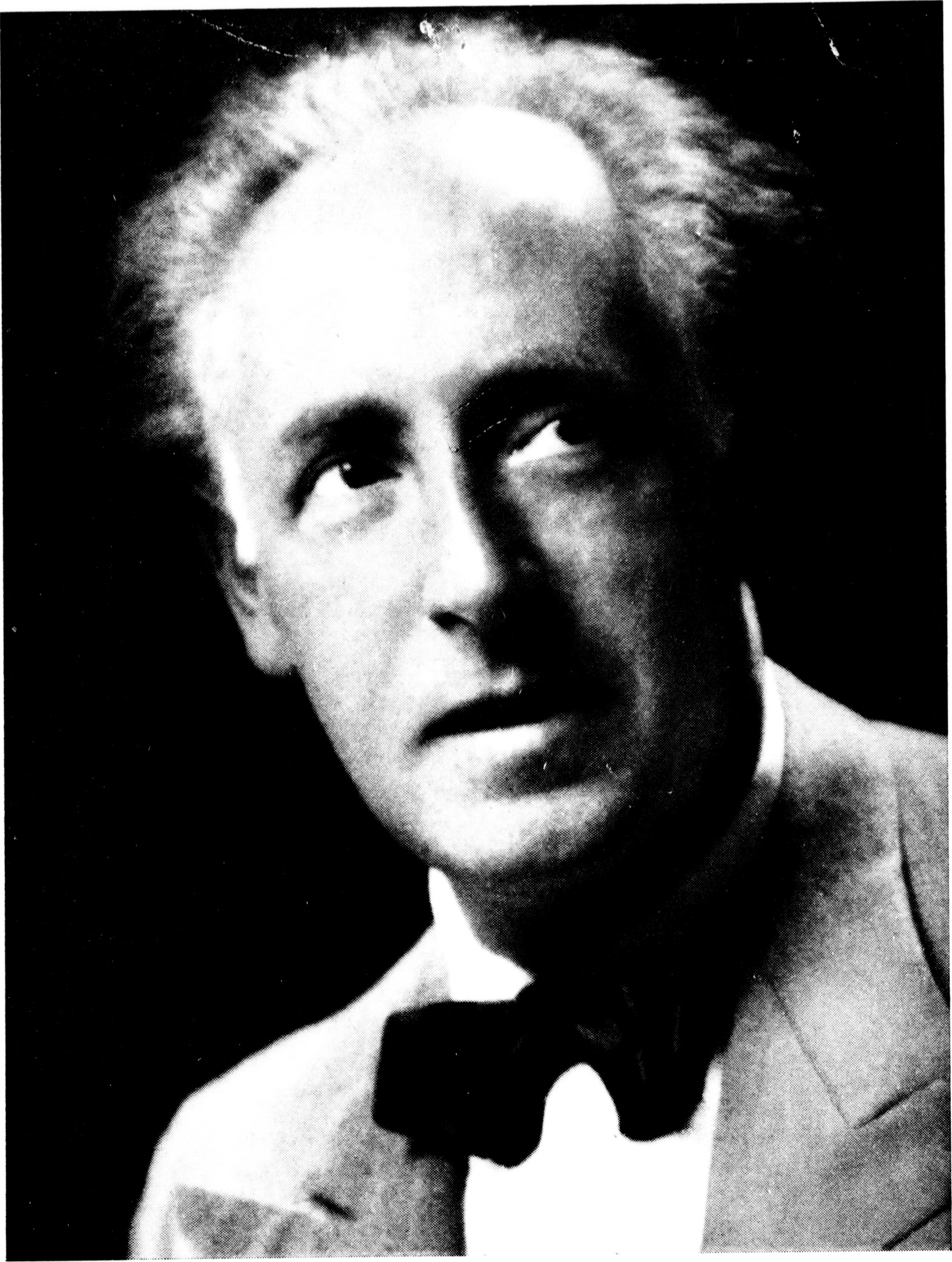
Fritz Kahn

Fritz Kahn (29 September 1888 – 14 January 1968) was a German-Jewish physician who published popular science books and is known for his illustrations, which pioneered infographics.

== Biography ==
Fritz Kahn was born in Halle an der Saale, Germany, the son of Arthur Kahn, a physician and author, and Hedwig Kahn, née Schmuhl. His father emigrated to the USA shortly after his birth, settling in Hoboken, New Jersey. Around 1893, after establishing his practise, he sent for his wife and son, and Fritz Kahn started school there. The family later moved to Manhattan, but in 1895 his mother returned to Germany with her three children. They spent time in Hamburg and again in Halle before moving to Bonn with Arthur Kahn after his return from the US, then finally in 1905 moved to Berlin, where Kahn took his Abitur at the Sophiengymnasium; he also served as an instructor in classes for workers.

Kahn studied medicine at the University of Berlin beginning in 1907, passing the state examination to become an M.D. in 1912/13. His studies focused on microbiology, but he also studied a variety of scientific and philosophical subjects, worked at an institute of meteorology, and wrote articles for the popular science magazine Kosmos. Around 1930 he went on geological expeditions to Palestine and the Polar circle. In 1932, after suffering from pneumonia for a month, he traveled to the Sahara to study the desert.

In 1933, antisemitic propaganda caused him to close his medical practice and his books were publicly burned. He immigrated to Palestine with his family, settling first in Haifa, then in Jerusalem. He wrote newspaper articles on contemporary issues and in 1934 exhibited in Jerusalem on The Hygiene of the School Child.

He divorced his wife and in 1937 married Erna Schnabel, cousin of pianist Artur Schnabel and a singer and music teacher, after which he moved to Paris. After the outbreak of World War II, he fled to Bordeaux. In 1940 he was interned by the French as an enemy alien. His wife secured his release and the couple fled to Spain and Portugal. He was one of the Jewish refugees assisted by the US agent Varian Fry; in early 1941, with the help of Albert Einstein, they were able to emigrate to the US, where they settled in Manhattan.

After the war, Kahn spent several long periods in Europe between 1948 and 1950, among other places in Ascona, but when it seemed unlikely he would soon be able to return there permanently, he once more settled in New York. He had a house in Atlantic Beach, Long Island and a studio in Manhattan. After his wife left him, he lived with Ellen Fussing, a Danish-American colleague, with whom he finally returned to Europe. Until 1960 they lived primarily in Switzerland, among other places in Lugano. In 1960, on vacation in Agadir, he survived a serious earthquake unharmed—in a sarcophagus. He was evacuated to Denmark with Fussing, settled in North Zealand, and in 1962 opened a studio in Copenhagen.Kahn traveled to Ascona in fall 1967 for health reasons; on 14 January 1968, he died in a clinic in Locarno.

== Medical career ==
From 1914 to 1922, he worked as a surgeon, gynecologist, and obstetrical aide at a clinic.

In World War I, he served as a medic, among other postings in Alsace, the Vosges, and Northern Italy. In 1918 he was invalided out on grounds of undernourishment and overwork and was cared for by an Italian farming family. After the war ended, he went to Algeria to recuperate.

After returning to Berlin and resuming practice as a physician, he married Irma Glogau in 1920. Around 1921 he traveled to Palestine, where he bought land on Mount Carmel and in Jerusalem. In 1922, he opened a private practise as a gynecologist.

In 1926, he advised on Jewish health for the GeSoLei exhibition on health, social welfare, and exercise in Düsseldorf and was one of the organizers of the Berlin exhibition on nutrition.

== Literary career ==
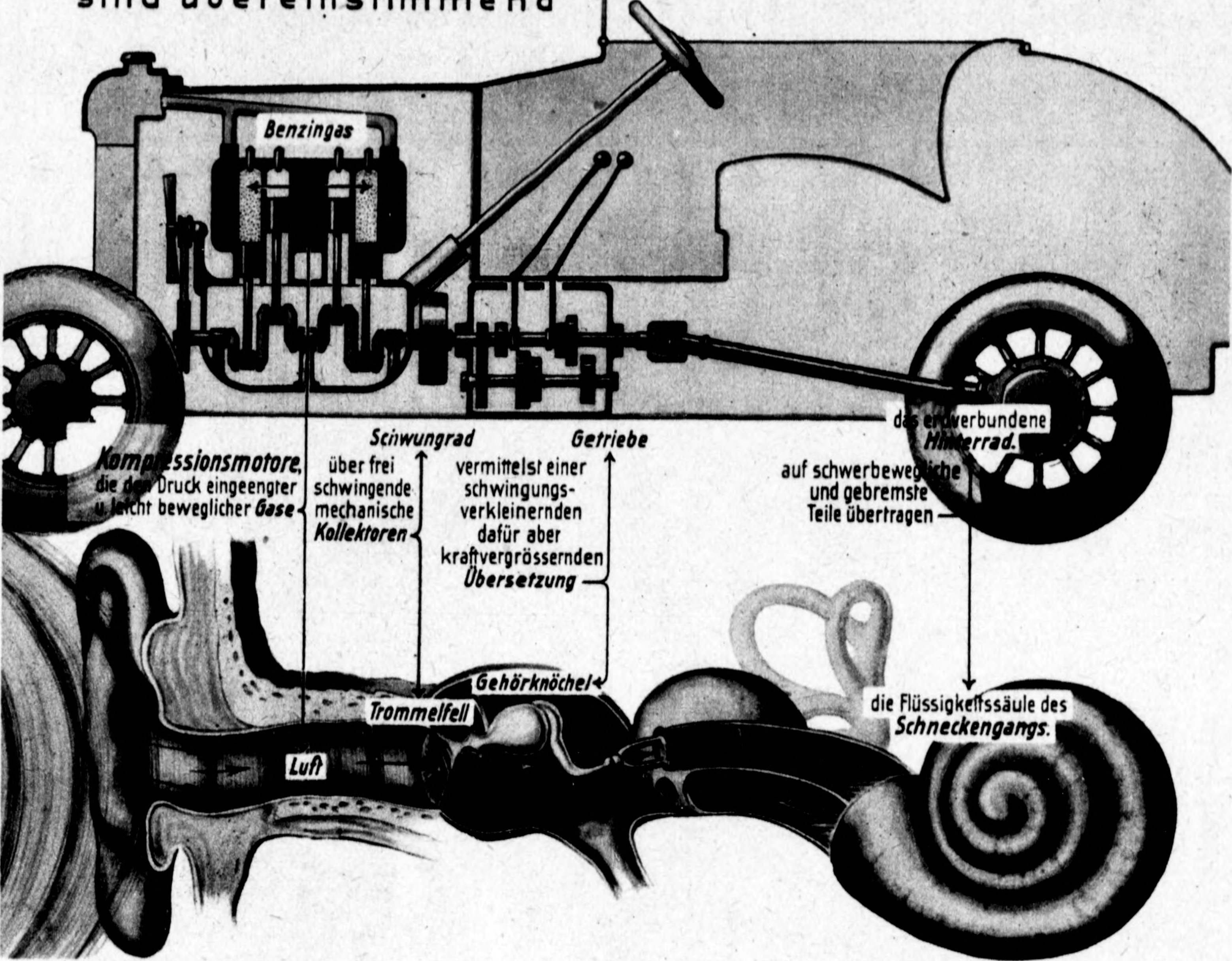
Comparison of force transmission in a car and the outer ear (from the Arthur and Fritz Kahn Collection)

In late 1938, shortly after Kristallnacht, Kahn's books were placed on the list of "damaging and undesirable writing" and in addition his book on sexuality, Unser Geschlechtsleben, was banned by the police and all available copies destroyed. Through the use of often startling metaphors, both verbal and visual, Kahn succeeded in making complex principles of nature and technology comprehensible to a person of average education. For example, he compared the ear to an automobile. Some of his images foretell the future: for example the "physician of the future" "remotely monitoring his patient's health from his desktop with the aid of various applets". Many are simply "arresting because [they are] drastically extreme visualizations": for example, "In 70 Jahren isst der Mensch 1400-mal sein Gewicht" (In 70 years a person will eat 1,400 times his weight) - which includes 40,000 cigars. Some of his drawings are inaccurate; when a friend pointed out one error, he responded: "Na ja, falsch ist es schon, aber verständlich!" ("Yup, it's wrong, but it's understandable!") His series Das Leben des Menschen (Human Life) was a best-seller. He continued to publish in exile and was included in Who's Who in the US in the mid-1950s, but in Germany he was largely forgotten after the banning of his books.

Kahn described the human body as "the most competent machine in the world", and his work reflects the technical and cultural state of development of Germany during the Weimar Republic. He himself did not draw well; the illustrations were made by others on his instructions. In Berlin, New York, and Copenhagen, he established studios for this purpose. His analogies between humans and machines have been interpreted by some artists, including Herbert Bayer and Eduardo Paolozzi. His graphics have also inspired some modern work, such as a trailer for the 2007 Sundance Film Festival and the ad for the music program Vamos Falar de Música on MTV Brasil. In 2009 the designer Henning Lederer animated Kahn's "Der Mensch als Industriepalast" (Man as Industrial Palace) as part of a final student project, attracting online attention. As pioneering work in infographics, Kahn's illustrations were returned to public attention in 2009 by Uta and Thilo von Debschitz's monograph Fritz Kahn – Man Machine / Maschine Mensch, and the first exhibition of his work was held in 2010 at the Berliner Medizinhistorisches Museum at the Charité.

Notes and drafts for Kahn's unfinished book The Natural History of Palestine are preserved in the Arthur and Fritz Kahn Collection at the Leo Baeck Institute, Center for Jewish History in New York.

== Published works ==
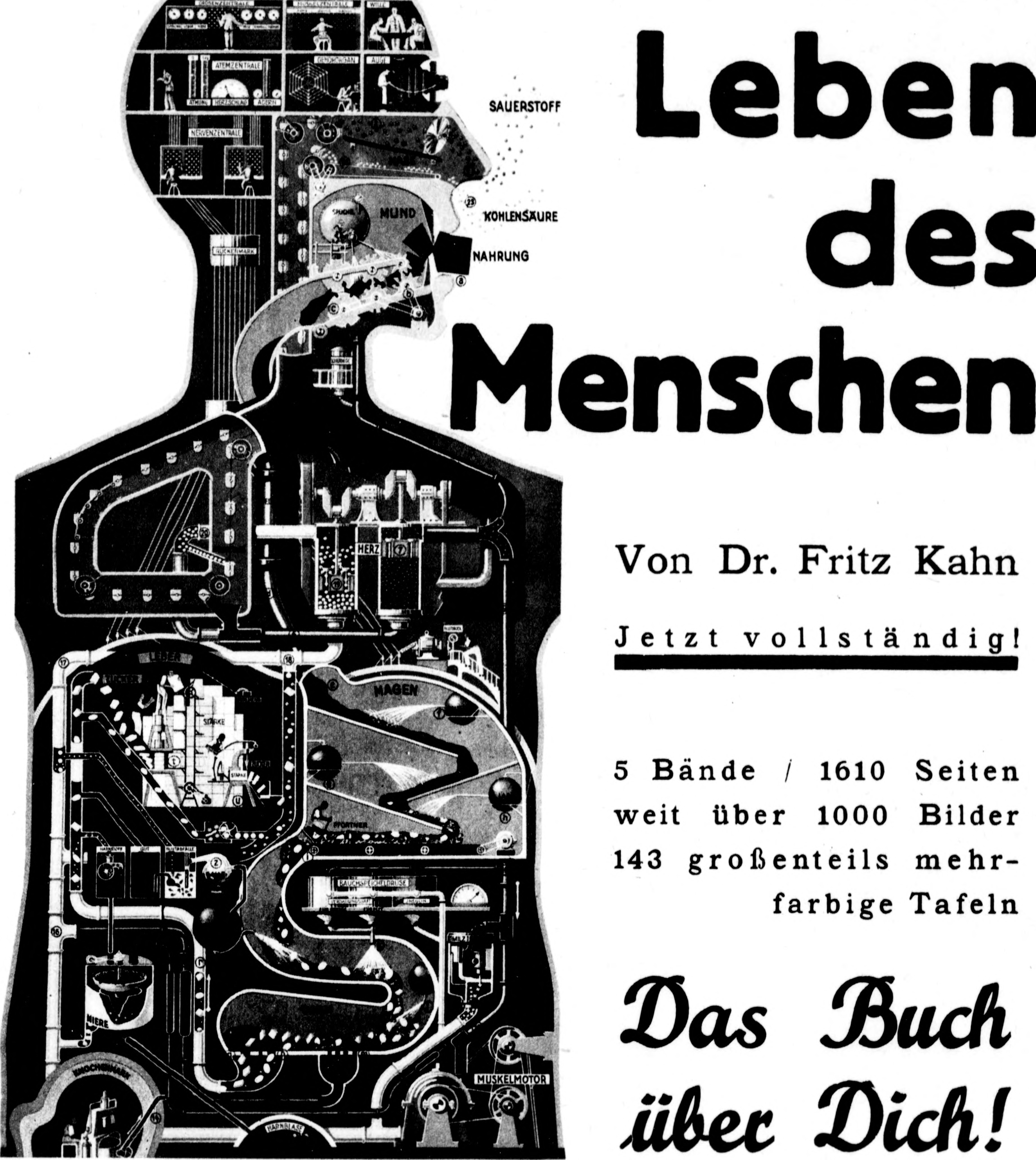
Das Leben des Menschen in the Arthur and Fritz Kahn Collection

- Das Versehen der Schwangeren in Volksglaube und Dichtung. Frankfurt: Sauerländer, 1912. Dissertation, University of Berlin.
- Die Milchstraße. Kosmos, 1914
- Die Zelle. Kosmos, 1919
- Die Juden als Rasse und Kulturvolk. Berlin: Welt, 1920
- Das Leben des Menschen. 5 vols. Stuttgart: Franckh’sche Verlagshandlung, 1922, 1924, 1926, 1929, 1931
- Unser Geschlechtsleben – ein Führer und Berater für jedermann. Rüschlikon/Zurich: Albert Müller, 1937
- Der Mensch gesund und krank. 2 vols. Zurich/Leipzig: Albert Müller, 1939
- Der Mensch, Bau und Funktionen unseres Körpers. Rüschlikon/Zurich: Albert Müller, 1940
- Man in Structure and Function. Tr. and ed. George Rosen. New York: Knopf, 1943.
- First Aid – Popular. New York: Krause, 1942
- Man in Structure and Function. 2 vols. New York: Knopf, 1943
- Das Atom – endlich verständlich. Zurich: Albert Müller, 1949
- Das Buch der Natur. 2 vols. Rüschlikon/Zurich: Albert Müller, 1952
- Design of the Universe: The Heavens and the Earth. New York: Crown, 1954
- Die Weltuhr – aus der Geschichte des Erdballs. Lux Lesebogen 209. Murnau: Lux, 1955
- Vogelvolk – vom Ur-Vogel bis zum Adler. Lux Lesebogen 219. Murnau: Lux, 1956
- Muss Liebe blind sein – Schule des Liebes- und Eheglücks, Albert Müller, Rüschlikon-Zürich 1957
- Sternenrätsel – von der Arbeit des Astronomen, Lux Lesebogen Nr. 237, Murnau 1957
- Die neun Planeten – Kinder der Sonne. Lux Lesebogen 247. Murnau: Lux, 1957
- Kräfte der Natur – Winde, Wolken, Wüsten. Lux Lesebogen 262. Murnau: Lux, 1958
- The Human Body. New York: Random House, 1965
