= Arboretum de La Roche-Guyon =

Arboretum in Île-de-France, France

Coordinates: 49°5′56″N 1°38′23″E

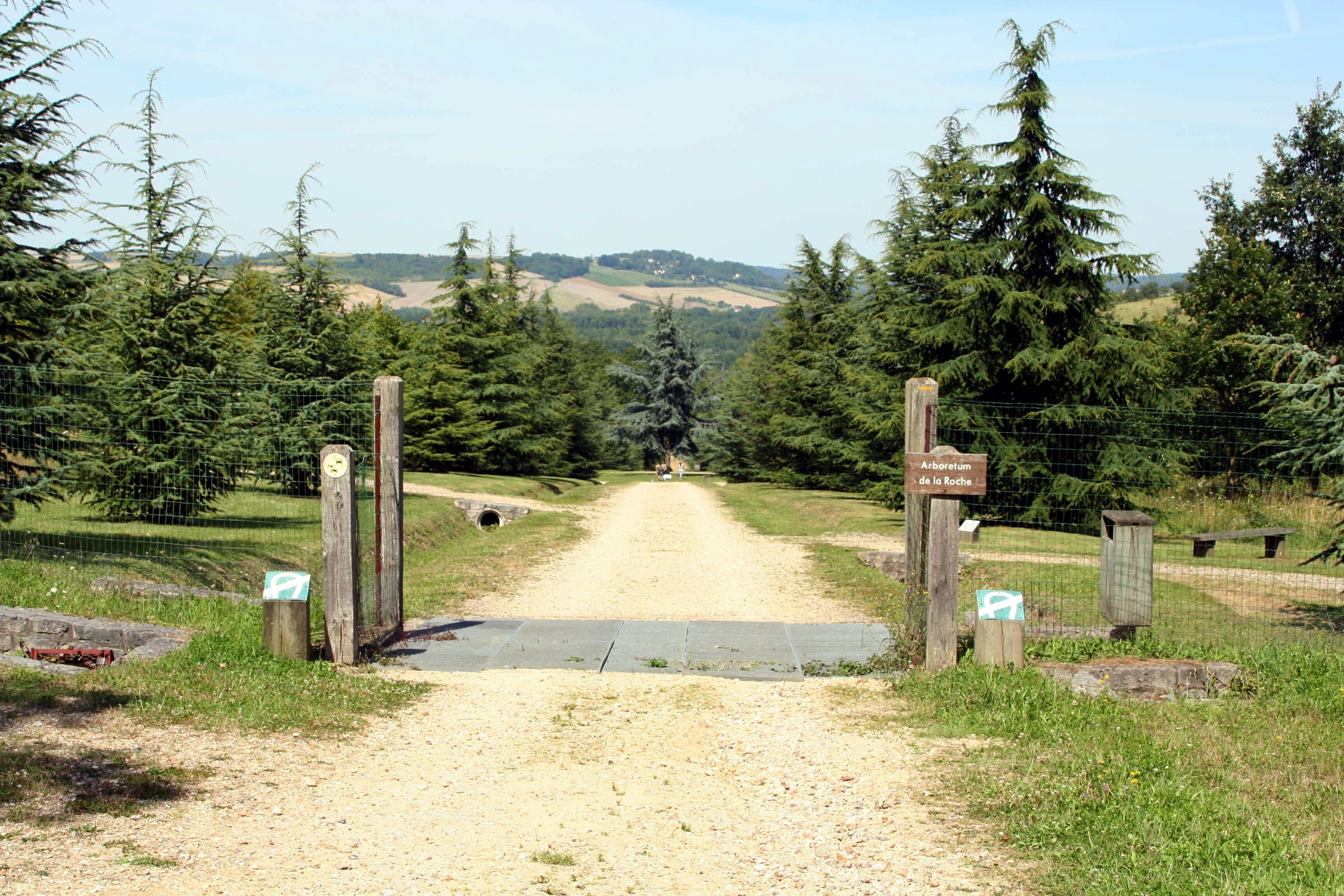
Arboretum de La Roche-Guyon

The Arboretum de La Roche-Guyon (12 hectares), also known as the Arboretum de La Roche, is an arboretum managed by the Office national des forêts (ONF). It is located in the regional forest (309 hectares) north of La Roche-Guyon, Val-d'Oise, Île-de-France, France, and open daily without charge.

The arboretum was created in 1990 by the ONF. It symbolizes the geography of Île-de-France, and contains 1821 trees reflecting the region's municipalities. Each of region's départements is represented by a mass of trees: maples for the Essonne; limes and laurels for the Hauts-de-Seine; oak, dogwood, eucalyptus, blackberry, holly, and buckthorn for the Seine-et-Marne; beech for Yvelines, and so forth. Rivers are represented by strips of lawn.

== See also ==
- List of botanical gardens in France
