= La Roche-Guyon =

- Commune
- Aerial view of La Roche-Guyon

- Coat of arms
- Location of La Roche-Guyon
- Location within France Location within Île-de-France (region)
- Coordinates: 49°04′56″N 1°37′49″E
- Country: France
- Region: Île-de-France
- Department: Val-d'Oise
- Arrondissement: Pontoise
- Canton: Vauréal
- Intercommunality: Vexin Val de Seine

Government
  - Mayor (2020–2026): Capucine Faivre
- Area^{1}: 4.61 km^{2} (1.78 sq mi)
- Highest elevation: 143 m (469 ft)
- Lowest elevation: 13 m (43 ft)
- Population (2023): 399
  - Density: 86.6/km^{2} (224/sq mi)
- Time zone: UTC+01:00 (CET)
  - Summer (DST): UTC+02:00 (CEST)
- INSEE/Postal code: 95523 /95780
- ^{1} French Land Register data, which excludes lakes, ponds, glaciers > 1 km^{2} (0.386 sq mi or 247 acres) and river estuaries.

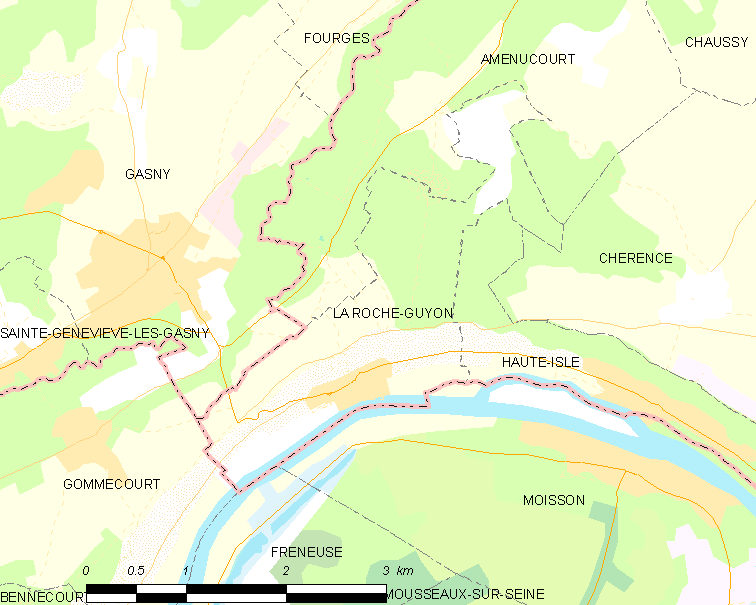
A map of the commune

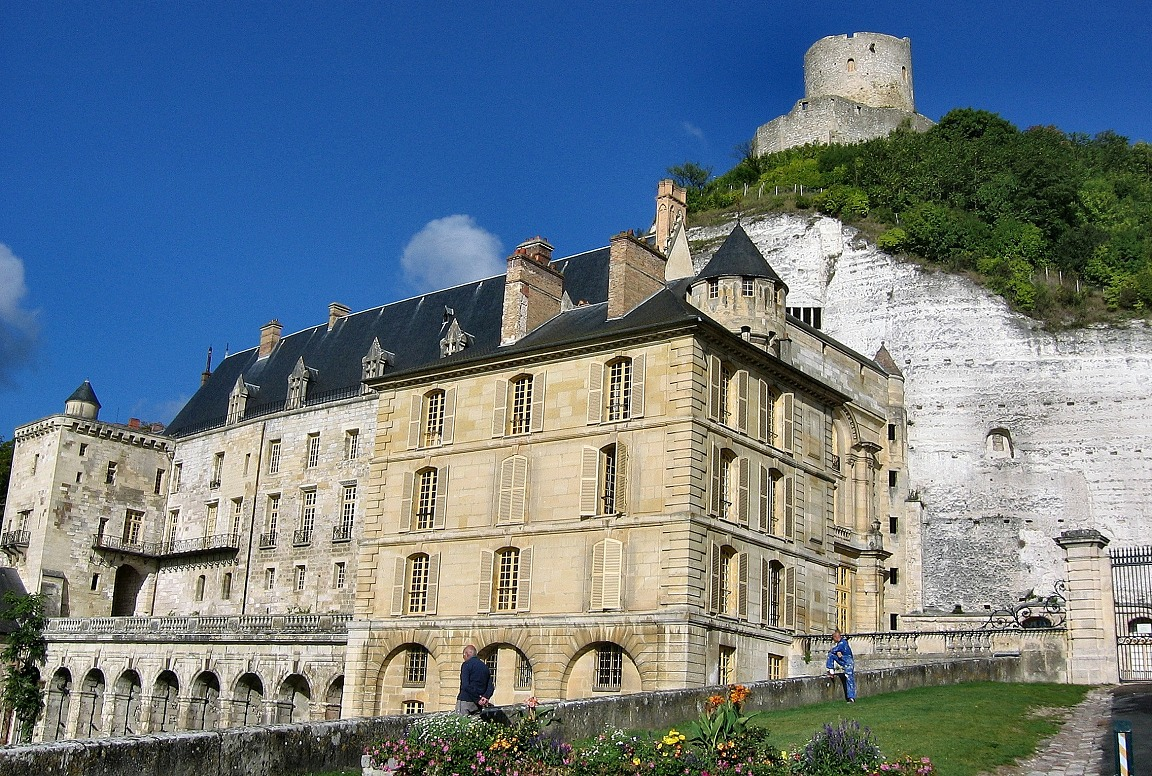
Château de La Roche-Guyon, with the donjon (keep) on the hill behind

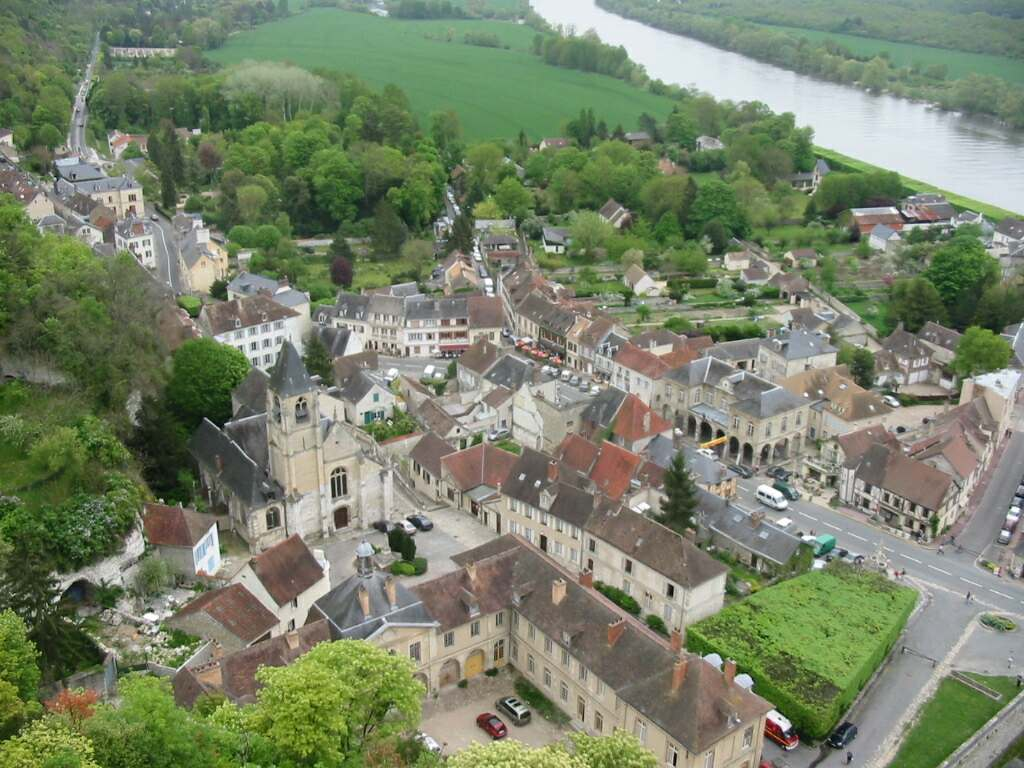
La Roche-Guyon seen from the top of the donjon

La Roche-Guyon (French pronunciation: [la ʁɔʃ ɡɥijɔ̃]) is a commune in the Val-d'Oise department in Île-de-France in northern France. It is located in the Vexin regional nature park, and is a member of Les Plus Beaux Villages de France (The Most Beautiful Villages of France) Association.

The commune grew around the Château de La Roche-Guyon, upon which historically it depended for its existence. The commune's population in 2019 was 479.

== Geography ==
It is located approximately 58 km from Paris and 9 km from Giverny.

== Château de La Roche-Guyon ==
The present Château de La Roche-Guyon was built in the 12th century, controlling a river crossing of the Seine, itself one of the routes to and from Normandy; The Abbé Suger described its grim aspect: "At the summit of a steep promontory, dominating the bank of the great river Seine, rises a frightful castle without title to nobility, called La Roche. Invisible on the surface, it is hollowed out of a high cliff. The able hand of the builder has established in the mountainside, digging into the rock, an ample dwelling provided with a few miserable openings". In the mid-13th century, a fortified manor house (the château-bas) was added below. Guy de La Roche fell at the Battle of Agincourt, and his widow was ousted from the Roche, after six months of siege, in 1419; she preferred to depart rather than accept Henry V of England as her overlord.

James V of Scotland and his bride Madeleine of Valois stayed for two nights in March 1537. The Château came to the Liancourt family with the marriage of Roger de Plessis-Liancourt to the heiress Marie de La Roche; he was a childhood companion of Louis XIII, first gentleman of the Chambre du Roi, and was made a duke in 1643. He and his wife made great changes to the château-bas, opening windows in its structure and laying out the terrace to the east, partly cut into the mountain's steep slope.

The domain of La Roche-Guyon came to the La Rochefoucauld family in 1669, with the marriage of Jeanne-Charlotte de Plessis-Liancourt with François VII de La Rochefoucauld. The Château retained its medieval aspect of a fortress, with its moat and towers and cramped, dark living apartments. The Château was largely extended in the 18th century.

When Turgot, the minister of Louis XVI, failed in his schemes for fundamental reforms in 1776, he retired to the Château briefly, as the guest of Louise Elisabeth Nicole de La Rochefoucauld, Duchesse d'Enville.

La Roche Guyon was the birthplace of François Alexandre Frédéric, duc de la Rochefoucauld-Liancourt (1747–1827).

In World War II, the château was a headquarters for German Field Marshal Erwin Rommel (1891–1944). After D-Day, he defended Normandy against the Allies in World War II from a bunker located here.

In 1962, the castle was used as a setting for the medieval segment of the Belgian comic on time travel: Le Piège Diabolique (The Time Trap) of the Blake and Mortimer series by Edgar Pierre Jacobs.

After 1990, restorations and archaeological surveys undertaken by the Conservatoire régional des Monuments historiques revealed new additions to the documentary history of La Roche-Guyon, undertaken in the 19th century by Hippolyte Alexandre and Emile Rousse.

In early 1960, French technocrats had the idea for a new administrative capital, to replace Paris as capital with a French "Brasília" built near La Roche-Guyon and to transform the commune into a "Monaco on the Seine". In early 1960, there was an architectural design competition for the Project, in which the architects Albert Laprade and Jean Brasilier participated.

The castle is opened to the public and several events take place there (Fête des Fleurs, Salon du Vin etc.).

The village is protected on its architecture (as La Roche-Guyon is locate in the Vexin Regional Park).

== Points of interest ==
- Arboretum de La Roche-Guyon
- Potager fruitier

== See also ==
- Operation Gaff
- Communes of the Val-d'Oise department
