= Varian Fry =

American journalist (1907–1967)

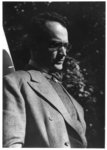
- Born: Varian Mackey Fry; October 15, 1907; New York City, New York, U.S.
- Died: September 13, 1967 (aged 59); Redding, Connecticut, U.S.
- Resting place: Green-Wood Cemetery, Brooklyn, New York; 40°39′23.35″N 73°59′41.67″W
- Education: Harvard University
- Occupation: Journalist
- Known for: Emergency Rescue Committee

Varian Mackey Fry (October 15, 1907 – September 13, 1967) was an American journalist. Fry ran a rescue network in Vichy France from August 1940 to September 1941 that helped 2,000 anti-Nazi and Jewish refugees, mostly artists and intellectuals, escape from persecution by Nazi Germany during World War II.

Fry spent "thirteen months directing a bold, high-risk, and much celebrated refugee-smuggling operation in the south of France that included an all-star cast of Kulturträger [culture carriers], among them artists Marc Chagall and Max Ernst, and writer André Breton and philosopher Hannah Arendt." His activities, illegal under the laws of Vichy France, contrary to the policies of the United States government, and opposed by many of the other refugee relief organizations in France resulted in his expulsion and the severing of ties with him by his organization, the Emergency Rescue Committee.

He was the first of five Americans to be recognized as "Righteous Among the Nations", an honorific given by the State of Israel to non-Jews who saved the lives of many Jews and anti-Nazi refugees during World War II.

== Early life ==
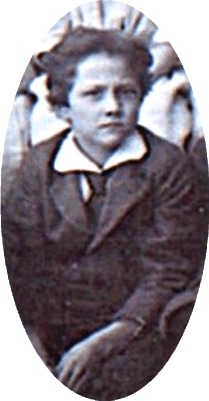
Fry as a child

Fry was born in New York City. His parents were Lillian (Mackey) and Arthur Fry, a manager of the Wall Street firm Carlysle and Mellick. The family moved to Ridgewood, New Jersey, in 1910. He grew up in Ridgewood and enjoyed bird-watching and reading. During World War I, at 9 years of age, Fry and friends conducted a fund-raising bazaar for the American Red Cross that included a vaudeville show, an ice cream stand and fish pond. He was educated at Hotchkiss School from 1922 to 1924, when he left the school due to hazing rituals. He then attended the Riverdale Country School, graduating in 1926.

An able and multilingual student, Fry scored in the top 10% of the Harvard University entrance exams. In 1927, as a Harvard undergraduate, he co-founded Hound & Horn, an influential literary quarterly, in collaboration with Lincoln Kirstein. He was suspended for a prank just before graduation and had to repeat his senior year. Through Kirstein's sister, Mina, he met his future wife, Eileen Avery Hughes, an editor of Atlantic Monthly, who was seven years his senior and had been educated at Roedean School and Oxford University. Although Fry was a closeted homosexual, according to his son James, they married on 2 June 1931.

== Journalist ==
While working as a foreign correspondent for the American journal The Living Age, Fry visited Berlin in 1935, and witnessed Nazi abuse against Jews on more than one occasion, which "turned him into an ardent anti-Nazi". He said in 1945, "I could not remain idle as long as I had any chances at all of saving even a few of its intended victims."

Following his visit to Berlin, in 1935 Fry wrote about the savage treatment of Jews by Hitler's regime in The New York Times. He wrote books about foreign affairs for Headline Books, owned by the Foreign Policy Association, including The Peace that Failed. It describes the troubled political climate following World War I, the break-up of Czechoslovakia and the events leading up to World War II.

== Emergency Rescue Committee ==
In June 1940, during World War II, the army of Nazi Germany invaded and quickly defeated France. The northern and western half of France was occupied by Germany; the southeastern half, called Vichy France, remained nominally independent, but with the obligation to "surrender upon demand" all German citizens if requested by the German government. Tens of thousands of refugees from Nazi Germany, and many others from elsewhere, had fled to Vichy France, mostly ending up in Marseille or in one of the squalid refugee camps scattered around Vichy.

The United States was still neutral in the war and maintained a diplomatic and commercial presence in Vichy France. Marseille was a beehive of refugees and British soldiers stranded after the Dunkirk evacuation. Humanitarian and relief organizations in the city, including the American Friends Service Committee (Quakers), Unitarians, YMCA, Red Cross, and seven Jewish organizations, especially HICEM whose funding came mostly from American Jews, were present to aid refugees. The Pat O'Leary Line in the city mostly helped stranded soldiers escape to Spain.

On June 25, 1940, two hundred prominent people met at the Hotel Commodore in New York City and founded the Emergency Rescue Committee (ERC). They raised $3,500 in contributions and in mid-July began looking for a representative to serve in Marseille. When none of the candidates seemed viable or willing, Fry volunteered and was accepted, albeit with reservations.

Fry was given three tasks for what was projected to be a three-week visit to France: (1) report on conditions impacting refugees; (2), help people identified as in danger from the Nazis escape to Portugal or Morocco; and (3) identify people who would work with the ERC. The emphasis would be on rescuing the elite intellectuals and artists trapped in Vichy France. Fry remained in France for thirteen months.

Fry was an unlikely choice as ERC's representative. One of the founders of the ERC, Karl Frank, said, "Send him to France, and he's dead." That being said, Fry was probably not in great danger in France. At that time, "an American passport gave most Americans abroad a reasonably justified sense of invulnerability." A biographer, Andy Marino, called Fry a "neurasthenic intellectual and expert on the ancient Greeks." His advantages were that he was an American and thus from a neutral country, spoke some French and German, would be unknown to the German Gestapo, and might be seen by them as just-another "high-minded dumb Yank."

American First Lady Eleanor Roosevelt supported the ERC; her husband, President Franklin, less so. He had an election to win in 1940 and refugees were not his priority. Moreover, the temper of the country was hostile to the admission of more refugees. A 1938 Roper Poll indicated that only 8.7 percent of the American populace wanted the United States to increase the number of refugees permitted to enter the U.S. beyond the number in the immigration quota. Another poll, taken after the anti-Jewish Kristallnacht riots in Germany, found that only 21 percent of Americans wanted more Jewish immigrants to be admitted to the U.S. Department of State officials in charge of approving entry visas to refugees were often accused of being antisemitic and anti-refugee, but they reflected the views of the U.S. government and its people.

In 1942, the Emergency Rescue Committee and the American branch of the European-based International Relief Association joined forces under the name the International Relief and Rescue Committee, which was later shortened to the International Rescue Committee (IRC). The IRC has continued into the 21st century as a nonsectarian, nongovernmental international relief and development organization.

== France ==
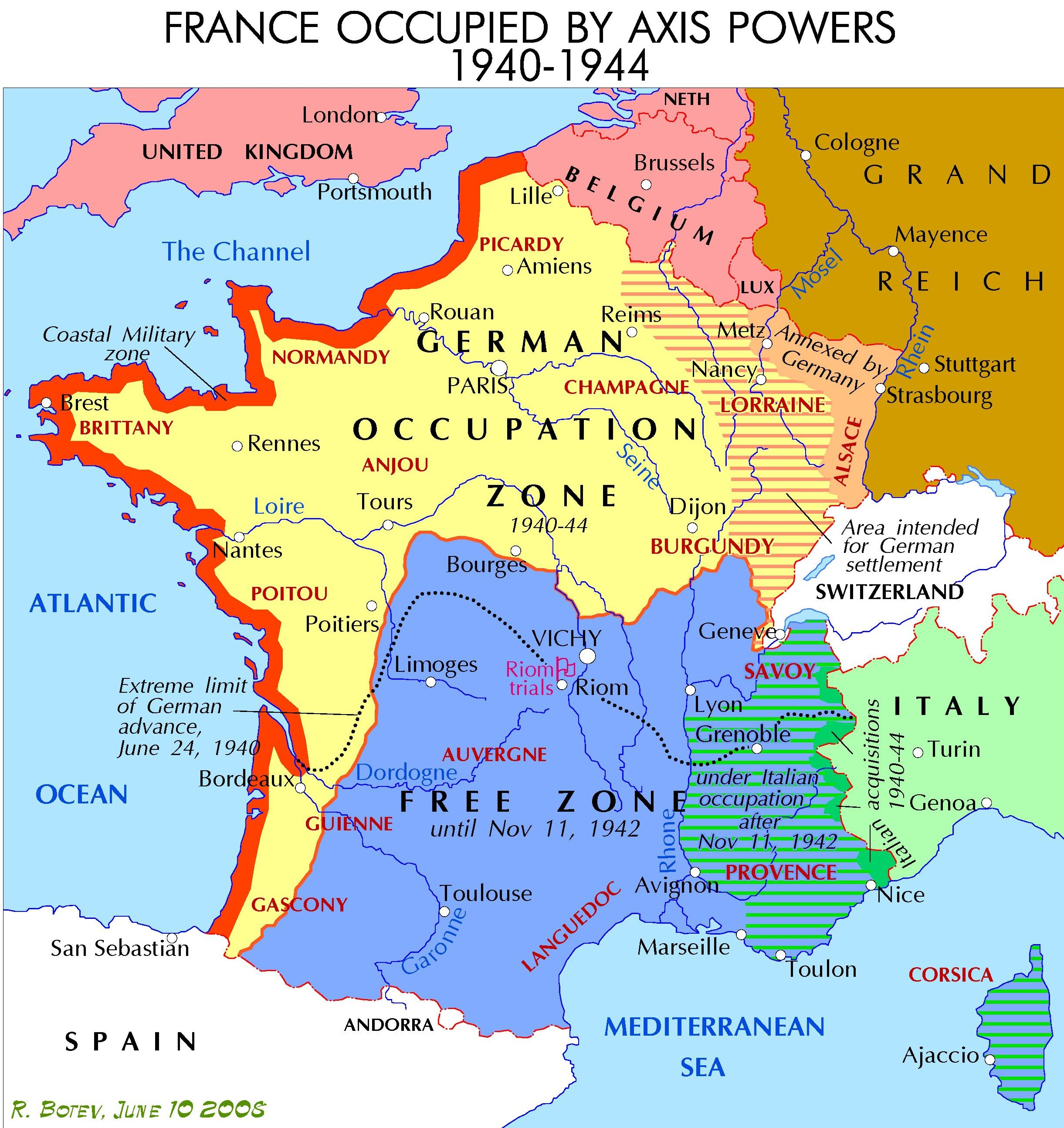
Tens of thousands of refugees from Nazi Germany took refuge in the Free Zone (Vichy France), especially in Marseille.

In August 1940, Fry arrived in Marseille representing the ERC in an effort to help persons seeking to flee the Nazis. Fry had $3,000 taped to his leg and a list of 200 artists and intellectuals, mostly German Jews, under imminent threat of arrest by agents of the Gestapo. He worked to circumvent bureaucratic processes set up by French authorities, who would not issue exit visas. Other anti-Nazi writers, avant-garde artists, musicians, and hundreds of others came to him, desperately seeking any chance to escape France. Fry's organization in Marseille was called the Centre Americain de Secours (American Center for Relief).

Initially, Fry relied on the experienced Waitstill Sharp of the Unitarian Service Committee to help him. Sharp said he spent three days orienting Fry on the techniques of semi-clandestine life. Fry's first major operation in September 1940 was in cooperation with Sharp. Four refugees in Marseille judged likely to be deported to Nazi Germany were novelists Lion Feuchtwanger and Heinrich Mann, Golo Mann, the son of novelist Thomas Mann, and writer Franz Werfel, plus their family members and a few others. Determined to take the refugees to Spain and from there to the United States, Fry and Sharp accompanied the group to the Spanish border, and Sharp continued on with them to Lisbon. An American named Leon "Dick" Ball guided them via smugglers' foot trails across the Pyrenees to an illegal entry into Spain. Sharp was less than complimentary about Alma Werfel who crossed the border in a white flowing dress that could be seen for miles. Her "legendary appeal" was lost on him. All the party of refugees made it to the United States.

Back in Marseille, despite the watchful eye of the collaborationist Vichy regime, Fry and a small group of volunteers hid people at the Villa Air-Bel until they could be smuggled out through neutral Spain and then to the relative safety of neutral Portugal where they took ships, mostly to the United States. Some of the exiles escaped on ships leaving Marseille for the French Caribbean colony of Martinique, from where they might also go to the United States.

Fry and Miriam Davenport, c. 1940

Fry's most important associate was a young French Protestant named Daniel Bénédite who functioned as his Chef de Cabinet and often his eyes and ears. Bénédite was briefly imprisoned by the French for his activities with ERC, but released through the intervention of one of the American diplomats in Marseille. American Charles Fernley Fawcett was the security guard, responsible for policing the long line of refugees waiting to be interviewed at Fry's headquarters. Fawcett also secured the release of several interned women by claiming to be married to them. Among Fry's closest associates were Americans Miriam Davenport, a former art student at the Sorbonne, and Chicago heiress Mary Jayne Gold, a lover of the arts and the "good life" who had come to Paris in the early 1930s. Gold was wealthy and financed many of the operations of the ERC.

Letter to his wife Eileen, February 1941

Among the people who have come into my office, or with whom I am in constant correspondence, are not only some of the greatest living authors, painters, sculptors of Europe . . . but also former cabinet ministers and even prime ministers of half a dozen countries. What a strange place Europe is when men like this are reduced to waiting patiently in the anteroom of a young American of no importance whatever.

— Varian Fry

Fry was among a group of people, mostly Americans, working in France, Spain, and Portugal to help refugees escape Nazi Germany and occupied Europe. Instrumental in getting Fry the U.S. visas he needed for the artists, intellectuals and political dissidents on his list was Hiram Bingham IV, an American Vice Consul in Marseille. Bingham was personally responsible for issuing thousands of visas, many not in accordance with U.S. immigration policies. Another diplomat in Marseille was Mexican Gilberto Bosques Saldívar who is credited with giving visas to 40,000 persons, mostly Jews, to emigrate to Mexico. The Unitarian office in Lisbon, under the direction of Charles R. Joy and, later, Robert Dexter, helped refugees to wait in safety for visas and other necessary papers, and to gain passage by sea from Lisbon. The YMCA representative in Marseille, Donald A. Lowrie was the leader of an advocacy group for refugees of 25 aid organizations in Vichy France. Lowrie obtained false passports from Czech diplomat Vladimir Vochoc for Czech refugees, including many Jews, and passed them on to Fry. In the United States, helping to secure visas for refugees, was Alfred Barr, Director of the Museum of Modern Art, and his wife Margaret Scolari Barr, an art historian also working at the MoMA.

The Centre Americain de Secours office in Marseille continued to function after Fry's departure in September 1941, getting an additional 300 people out of France. The Vichy government ordered the office closed in June 1942.

== Controversy ==
Fry was shunned by most of the refugee aid organizations in Vichy France, especially after a cable in September 1940 from U.S. Secretary of State Cordell Hull:

The Government can not repeat not countenance the activities of Mr. Bohn [American Federation of Labor] and Mr. Fry and other persons. However well meaning their activities may be, in carrying on activities evading the laws of the countries with which the United States maintains friendly relations.

The priority of the United States in Vichy France was not facilitating the emigration of refugees to the U.S. John Hurley, a diplomat at the U.S. Consulate in Marseille, advised Fry to return home and the ERC in New York called him back. He responded by justifying his program and saying that he needed to stay in Marseille until a replacement arrived. He stayed another year. To Fry, the other refugee organizations were too law abiding, while they regarded him as a threat to their refugee aid programs and their attempts to build a working relationship with the American diplomats and Vichy officials to obtain visas and exit permits. HICEM, the well-funded and large Jewish organization, was wary of Fry as he was of them. He considered HICEM too sectarian. Apparently referring to Fry and the atmosphere at the Villa Air-Bel, Unitarian Charles Joy, said caustically that "working with refugees was not a parlor game."

Fry was forced to leave France in September 1941 after officials of both the Vichy government and the State Department objected to his covert activities. He then spent more than a month in Lisbon before returning to the United States in October. In January 1942, the ERC fired him. "Unfortunately, your attitude since returning to this country have made it inadvisable for us to continue your connection with the Committee," read the dismissal letter.

== Refugees aided by Fry ==
Among the problems of Fry and his associates was the character of some of the refugees. Author Marino said the artistic and intellectual refugees handled by the ERC were like "herding cats...these were arrogant Germans who were used to having servants and ordering people around. And they'd suddenly been thrust into a position where it was the opposite, and they were the supplicants, and they were the people who depended on others for their lives, not just employment and food."

Charlie Fawcett, one of Fry's associates, commented similarly: "They wouldn’t listen to you. They thought, 'We were so famous, nobody will do anything to us.' Some of them said that! 'The French wouldn’t dare to do anything to us—there’s world opinion.' World opinion—can you imagine that? Let me tell you, world opinion wasn’t standing behind them much in those days."

The selection of those deemed eligible for ERC help among many tens of thousands of refugees was a brutal process, consisting of interviews and the personal knowledge of Fry and his associates. Fry later admitted that mistakes were made in deciding who received and who was denied help. The ERC staff was leery of anyone not known to them as he or she could be a police spy. Among those aided by Fry and the ERC, and also often aided by other refugee organizations, were:

- Hannah Arendt
- Jean Arp
- Hans Aufricht
- Hans Bellmer
- Georg Bernhard
- Victor Brauner
- André Breton
- Camille Bryen
- De Castro ("Secretary of the Faculty of Science at the University of Madrid")
- Marc Chagall and his wife Bella Rosenfeld
- Frédéric Delanglade
- Óscar Domínguez
- Marcel Duchamp
- Heinrich Ehrmann
- Max Ernst
- Edvard Fendler
- Lion Feuchtwanger
- Leonhard Frank
- Giuseppe Garetto
- Oscar Goldberg
- Emil Julius Gumbel
- Hans Habe
- Jacques-Salomon Hadamard
- Konrad Heiden
- Jacques Hérold
- Wilhelm Herzog
- Berthold Jacob
- Heinz Jolles
- Erich Itor Kahn
- Fritz Kahn
- Arthur Koestler
- Siegfried Kracauer
- Wifredo Lam
- Jacqueline Lamba
- Wanda Landowska
- Lotte Leonard
- Claude Lévi-Strauss
- Jacques Lipchitz
- Alberto Magnelli
- Alma Mahler
- Jean Malaquais
- Bohuslav Martinů
- Golo Mann
- Heinrich Mann
- Valeriu Marcu
- André Masson
- Roberto Matta
- Walter Mehring
- Alfredo Mendizábal
- Otto Fritz Meyerhof
- Boris Mirkine-Guetzevitch
- Hans Namuth
- Hans Natonek
- Ernst-Erich Noth
- Max Ophüls
- Hertha Pauli
- Benjamin Péret
- Alfred Polgar
- Poliakoff-Litovzeff
- Peter Pringsheim
- Denise Restout
- Hans Sahl
- Jacques Schiffrin
- Anna Seghers
- Victor Serge
- Ferdinand Springer
- Fred Stein
- Bruno Strauss
- Sophie Taeuber
- Remedios Varo
- Franz Werfel
- Kurt Wolff and Helen Wolff
- Wols (Alfred Otto Wolfgang Schulze)
- Ylla (Camilla Koffler)

== Back in the United States ==
There are some things so horrible that decent men and women find them impossible to believe, so monstrous that the civilized world recoils incredulous before them. The recent reports of the systematic extermination of the Jews in Nazi Europe are of this order... we can offer asylum now, without delay or red tape, to those few fortunate enough to escape from the Aryan paradise. There have been bureaucratic delays in visa procedure which have literally condemned to death many stalwart democrats... This is a challenge which we cannot, must not, ignore.

— Fry, Varian. "The Massacre of Jews in Europe." The New Republic, 1942.

Fry wrote and spoke critically against U.S. immigration policies particularly relating to the fate of Jews in Europe. In a December 1942 issue of The New Republic, he wrote a scathing article titled: "The Massacre of Jews in Europe".

Other American refugee workers with experience in Europe, acknowledging that Fry's program in France had been effective, recruited him in 1944 to provide guidance to the Roosevelt administration's late-breaking refugee rescue program, the War Refugee Board.

Fry published a book in 1945 about his time in France under the title Surrender on Demand, first published by Random House, 1945. (Its title refers to the 1940 French-German armistice clause requiring France to hand over to German authorities any refugee from "Greater Germany" the Gestapo might identify, a requirement Fry routinely violated.) A later edition was published by Johnson Books, in 1997, in conjunction with the U.S. Holocaust Museum. In 1968, the US publisher Scholastic (which markets mainly to children and adolescents) published a paperback edition under the title Assignment: Rescue.

After the war, Fry worked as a journalist, magazine editor and business writer. He also taught college and was in film production. Feeling as if he had lived the peak of his life in France, he developed ulcers. Fry went into psychoanalysis and said that "as time went on, he grew more and more troubled."

Fry and his wife Eileen divorced after he returned from France. She developed cancer and died on May 12, 1948. During her hospital convalescence, Fry visited her and read to her daily. At the end of 1948 or early 1949, Fry met Annette Riley, who was 16 years his junior. They married in 1950, had three children together, but were separated in 1966, possibly owing to his irrational behavior, believed to have been a result of manic depression.

Fry died of a cerebral hemorrhage and was found dead in his bed on September 13, 1967, by the Connecticut State Police. He was buried at Green-Wood Cemetery, Brooklyn, New York with his parents.

Fry's papers are held in Columbia University's Rare Book and Manuscript Library.

== Published works ==
Author

- A Bibliography of the Writings of Thomas Stearns Eliot, Hound & Horn, 1928
- Headline Books, New York: Foreign Policy Association, 1938.
- War in China: America's Role in the Far East, New York: Foreign Policy Association, 1938. LCCN 38-27205
- Bricks Without Mortar: The Story of International Cooperation, New York: Foreign Policy Association, 1938; 1939 LCCN 39-2481
- The Peace that Failed: How Europe Sowed the Seeds of War, New York: Foreign Policy Association, 1939. LCCN 40-3702
- Surrender on Demand, New York: Random House, 1945; Johnson Books, 1997 LCCN 45-3492 OCLC 1315136
- To Whom it May Concern, 1947.
- Assignment Rescue: An Autobiography, Scholastic Inc., 1968; 1970; 1993; Four Winds Press, 1969; Madison (Wisconsin): Demco, 1992 ISBN 978-0-439-14541-1

Co-author

- Popper, David H., Shepard Stone and Varian Fry, The puzzle of Palestine, New York: Foreign Policy Association, 1938
- Goetz, Delia and Varian Fry, The Good Neighbours: The Story of the Two Americas, The Foreign Policy Association, 1939 LCCN 39-7983
- Fry, Varian and Emil Herlin, War Atlas: A Handbook of Maps and Facts, New York: Foreign Policy Association, 1940 LCCN 42-11302
- Wolfe, Henry Cutler, James Frederick Green, Stoyan Pribichevich, Varian Fry, William V. Reed, Elizabeth Ogg and Emil Herlin, Spotlight on the Balkans, New York: Foreign Policy Association, 1940

== Legacy ==
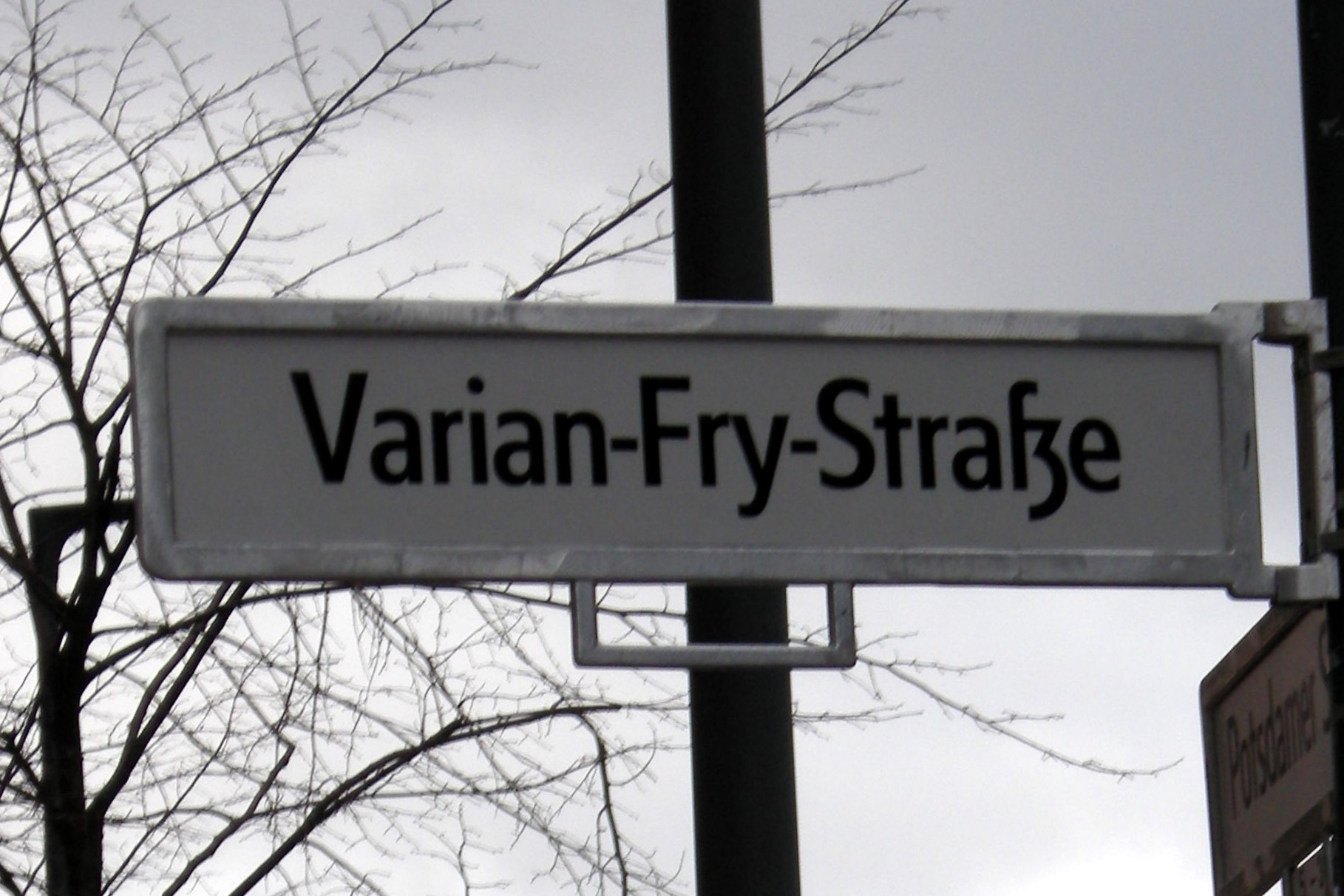
Varian Fry Street, Berlin

- 1967 - The government of France recognized Fry's contribution to freedom making him a Chevalier of the Légion d'honneur, the only honor in his lifetime, awarded at the French Consulate in New York
- 1980 - Mary Jayne Gold's book titled Crossroads Marseilles 1940 sparked an interest in Fry and his efforts.
- 1991 - The United States Holocaust Memorial Council awarded Fry the Eisenhower Liberation Medal.
- 1994 - Fry became the first United States citizen to be listed in the Righteous Among the Nations at Israel's national Holocaust Memorial, award by Yad Vashem.
- 1997 - Irish film director David Kerr made a documentary entitled Varian Fry: The America's Schindler that was narrated by actor Sean Barrett.
- 1998 - Fry was awarded the "Commemorative Citizenship of the State of Israel" on January 1, 1998.
- 2001 - Fry's story was also told in dramatic form in the Showtime made-for-television film Varian's War, written and directed by Lionel Chetwynd and starring William Hurt and Julia Ormond.
- 2002 - On the initiative of Samuel V. Brock, the U.S. Consul General in Marseille from 1999 to 2002, the square in front of the consulate was renamed Place Varian Fry.
- 2005 - A street in the newly reconstructed East/West Berlin Wall area in the Berlin borough of Mitte at Potsdamer Platz was named Varian-Fry-Straße in recognition of his work.
- 2005 - A street in his home town of Ridgewood, New Jersey, was renamed Varian Fry Way.
- 2007 - On October 15, 2007, the U.S. House of Representatives honored Varian Fry on the 100th anniversary of his birth.
- 2012 - Four musicians of the Berliner Philharmoniker founded the Varian Fry Quartet. In April 2013 it gave its first public concert at the Easter Festival in Baden-Baden.
- 2019 - Julie Orringer's historical novel The Flight Portfolio portrayed a fictionalized account of Fry's life and experiences in Marseille, merging real events and historical characters with invented elements (including a clandestine love affair and intrigue surrounding the plot to rescue a fictional young physics genius).
- 2021 - Dara Horn's People Love Dead Jews devoted a lengthy chapter, On rescuing Jews and others, to the life and legacy of Varian Fry.
- 2023 - Transatlantic, a streaming television series based on Orringer's The Flight Portfolio was released on Netflix, with Cory Michael Smith playing Varian Fry.

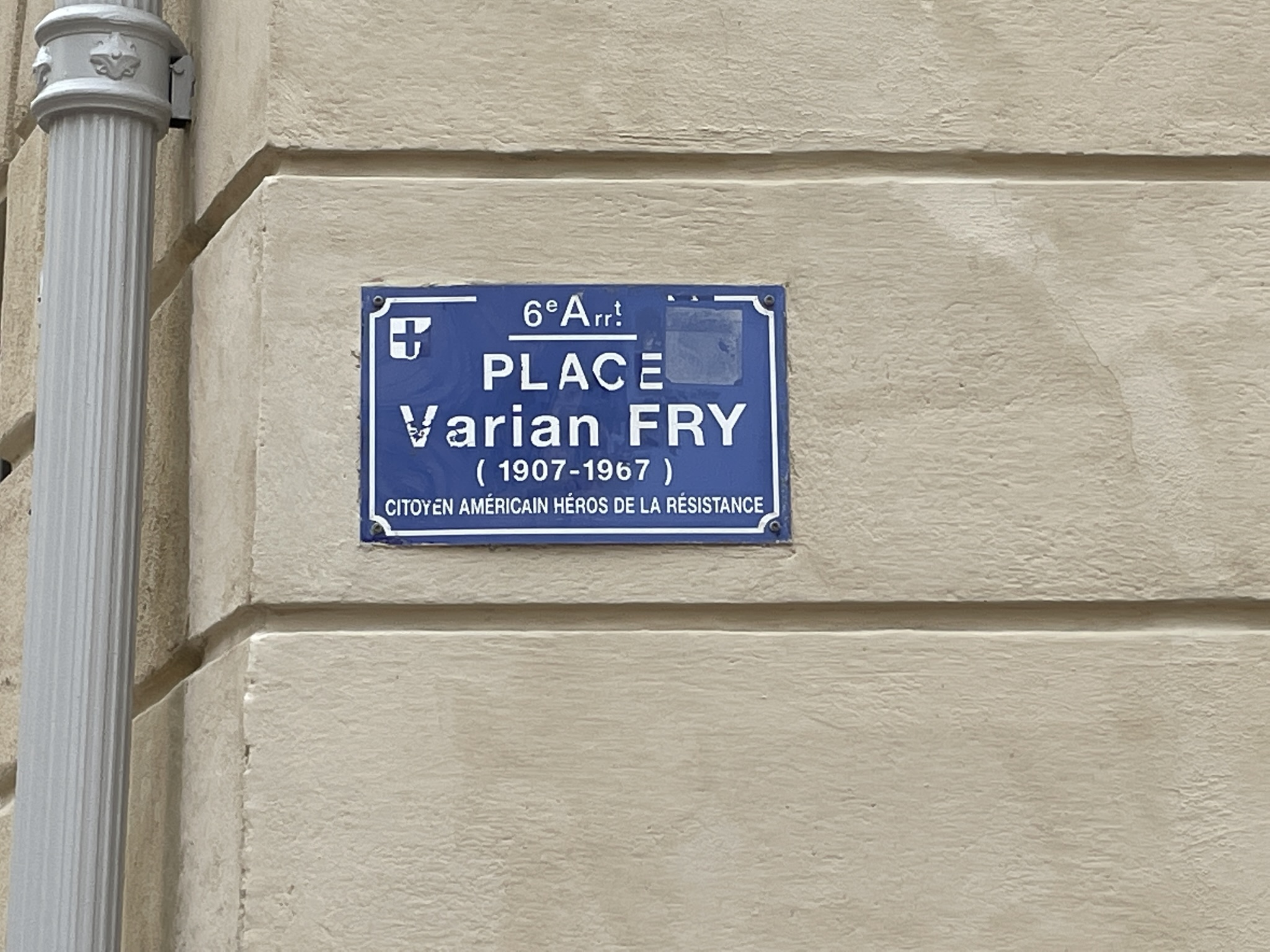
Place Varian Fry in Marseille

- 2025 - Following a petition from Philosopher David Pettigrew, the State of Connecticut formally recognized October 15 as 'Varian Fry Day'. with a commemoration held at Southern Connecticut State University

== See also ==
- Chiune Sugihara
- Refugee workers in Vichy France
- Sousa Mendes Foundation
