= Miriam Davenport =

American painter and sculptor

Miriam Davenport Ebel
- Miriam Davenport and Varian Fry
- Born: Miriam Davenport; June 6, 1915; Boston, Massachusetts
- Died: September 13, 1999 (aged 84); Mt. Pleasant, Michigan
- Resting place: Iowa
- Known for: Painter and sculptor
- Spouses: Rudolph Treo (c. 1940 – by 1946); William L.M. Burke (1946–1961); Charles Ebel

Miriam Davenport or Miriam Davenport Ebel (June 6, 1915 – September 13, 1999) was an American painter and sculptor, She worked with Varian Fry and the Emergency Rescue Committee in 1940 helping European Jewish and intellectuals refugees escape from German-occupied France during World War II.

After her return to the United States in late 1941, she worked on cultural issues in primarily academic settings. She also continued to support human rights organizations.

== Personal life and education ==
Miriam Davenport was born on June 6, 1915, in Boston, Massachusetts. Her parents were steam boat captain Howard Ernest Davenport and Florence L. (Sparrow) Davenport. In 1920 they lived in Delaware City, Delaware. They also had a son, Howard, who was born about 1926.

In 1930, the family of four lived in New Rochelle, New York. Her father died on 30 April 1936.

Her mother had also died while Davenport was attending Smith College, and the parents had debts. Davenport studied architecture and art history. She graduated in 1937 and studied at New York University's Graduate Institute of Fine Arts for one year.

Davenport went to France to attend the Institut d'Art et d'Archéologie at the Sorbonne in Paris on a Carnegie summer art scholarship. There she fell in love with fellow artist, Rudolph Treo, an exile from Yugoslavia.

== World War II ==
American consulate in Marseille at the beginning of World War II

A strong odor of xenophobia and antisemitism permeated the premises. I was learning fast. The business of my government was business; American interests overseas were economic interests. Americans with jobs or investments overseas had no passport problems; those with moral obligations or family ties were a nuisance, their pleas worthless irrelevancies.

— Miriam Davenport

With the June 1940 German occupation of France, Davenport fled Paris with Treo. As they traveled south, they split up. In Toulouse, Davenport met poet Walter Mehring and other German and European refugees who were seeking to escape France to go to the United States. The port city of Marseille, although under control of the Vichy Regime, was not yet occupied by the Nazis.

Seeking ways for refugees to leave from there, Davenport met American journalist Varian Fry, who invited her to join his staff at the Centre Américain de Secours, or American Relief Center on August 27, 1940. (It also became known as the Emergency Rescue Committee.) She persuaded him to bring on others, including fellow American, Mary Jayne Gold, a wealthy Chicago socialite. Davenport sought out artists and other refugees, interviewed them, and determined who was most in need of help.

With Gold and Theodora Bénédite, Davenport rented the Villa Air-Bel in Marseille. They used it as a place to house some of the people they were aiding to escape. She invited her clients Victor Serge and André Breton and their families to move into the immense house. It became a "famous last gathering place" of the Surrealists.

Refugee rescue mission

The entire drama was to involve a large number of ethically principled Americans in and around the Emergency Rescue Committee in New York, a number of other organizations, and some individuals working on their own account. Their frontman in Marseilles was the extraordinary Harvard preppie, Varian Fry, who was eventually to help some two thousand people to escape... canny and strategic Americans helping out under the very noses of the Nazis included Miriam Davenport.

— Clive Bush

The Gestapo had identified notable people whom they wanted to capture. At enormous risk to themselves, Davenport and the others ran a covert operation helping writers, artists, scientists, and academics, mostly Jews, to escape from France. They arranged for some of these refugees to escape over the mountains to the safety of Spain and neutral Portugal. Others they smuggled aboard freighters sailing to either North Africa or ports in North or South America.

Davenport worked on the effort until October 1940. Fry and Gold were involved for another year, but they had to leave after Fry was arrested by the French in the fall of 1941. In the less than two years that the American Relief Center was able to operate in Marseille, it evacuated more than 2,000 refugees, who came from all over Europe. These included such notable figures as the artist Marc Chagall, Hitler biographer Konrad Heiden, artist Max Ernst, Nobel Prize winner Otto Meyerhof, and writers Hannah Arendt and Franz Werfel. The consulate address was named "Place Varian Fry" in recognition of the lives he saved.

While Davenport was in France, her fiancé, Rudolph Treo, had returned home to Ljubljana, Yugoslavia, where he become seriously ill. Davenport went to Ljubljana in October 1940 to get him and bring him to Marseille. But her visa was not granted and she was unable to return to France. They lived with his parents in Ljubljana until it was annexed to Italy in April 1941. Davenport and Treo were married that month, and they traveled to Switzerland along an Italian-controlled road to obtain a passport for Treo.

They later reached Portugal. On December 12, 1941, just after the bombing of Pearl Harbor, Davenport and her husband, Professor Rudolph Treo, sailed for the United States from Lisbon on the SS Excambion. On her return to the United States, Davenport became involved with the American Council of Learned Societies Committee for the Protection of Cultural Treasures in War Areas. She helped prepare maps and documentation for use by the Allied Forces to help avoid bombing culturally important sites as well as to enable military units on the ground to secure these sites to prevent pillaging.

Over the decade from 1941 to 1951, she was also involved in a number of humanitarian efforts, including the International Rescue Committee, the Progressive Schools Committee for Refugee Children, and the NAACP Legal Defense and Educational Fund.

== Post-war life ==
Her first marriage didn't last and in 1946 Davenport married William L. M. ("Bill") Burke, a professor of ancient and medieval history at Princeton University. Burke was the Director of the Index of Christian Art there from 1942 to 1951. He had worked with the American Council of Learned Societies (ACLS) during the war. Davenport worked at Princeton University where she oversaw the office of the Emergency Committee of Atomic Scientists for Albert Einstein.

In 1951 she and her husband moved to Iowa, where he had been offered a professorship at the University of Iowa. After settling there, Davenport began studying and making art again. While working on her graduate degree, she made sculptures and paintings, which she began exhibiting and winning prizes by 1953. Her husband died very suddenly in 1961. To support herself, Davenport taught French and art to children in Riverside, Iowa.

She met archaeologist Charles Ebel who was an ancient history scholar. They married and Davenport pursued further post-graduate studies. In 1973 she earned her Ph.D. in French literature from the University of Iowa. She also worked as an art instructor and taught French language courses at the university.

Dr. Ebel was hired by Central Michigan University to teach history. Davenport did a thesis on Claude Prosper Jolyot de Crébillon, an 18th-century writer.

== Crossroads Marseilles, 1940 ==
Davenport's friend Mary Jayne Gold published her memoir titled Crossroads Marseilles, 1940 (1980), which recounted their efforts during World War II. Varian Fry had died in 1967, but Davenport visited Marseille and was reunited with Gold. After the war, the latter had returned to live permanently on the French Riviera in a villa she had built there.

== Death ==
On September 13, 1999, Davenport died in Mt. Pleasant, Michigan, of cancer. Her body was returned to Iowa for burial.
