= Otto Fritz Meyerhof =

German biochemist (1884–1951)

Otto Fritz Meyerhof ForMemRS
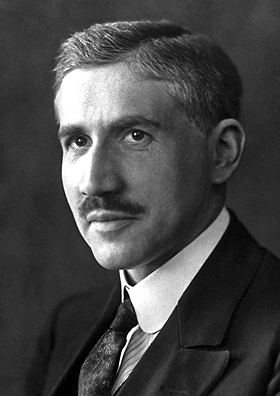
- Born: 12 April 1884; Hanover, Kingdom of Prussia, German Empire
- Died: 6 October 1951 (aged 67); Philadelphia, Pennsylvania, United States
- Education: University of Strasbourg; University of Heidelberg; University of Berlin
- Known for: Relationship between the consumption of oxygen and the metabolism of lactic acid in the muscle
- Awards: Nobel Prize in Physiology or Medicine, 1922
- Scientific career
- Fields: Physics and Biochemistry
- Workplaces: University of Kiel

Otto Fritz Meyerhof (German pronunciation: [ˈɔto ˈmaɪɐhoːf]; 12 April 1884 – 6 October 1951) was a German physician and biochemist who won the 1922 Nobel Prize in Physiology and Medicine.

== Biography ==
Otto Fritz Meyerhof was born in Hannover, at Theaterplatz 16A (now:Rathenaustrasse 16A), the son of wealthy Jewish parents. In 1888, his family moved to Berlin, where Otto spent most of his childhood, and where he started his study of medicine. He continued these studies in Strasbourg and Heidelberg, from which he graduated in 1909, with a work titled "Contributions to the Psychological Theory of Mental Illness".

In Heidelberg, he met Hedwig Schallenberg. They married in 1914 and had three children together: a daughter, Bettina, and two sons, Gottfried (who after emigration used the anglicized name Geoffrey) and Walter.

In 1912, Otto Meyerhof moved to the University of Kiel, where he received a professorship in 1918. In 1922, he was awarded the Nobel Prize in Medicine, with Archibald Vivian Hill, for his work on muscle metabolism, including glycolysis. In 1929, he became one of the directors of the Kaiser Wilhelm Institute for Medical Research in Heidelberg, a position he held until 1938, when Jews were expelled from university teaching positions.

To escape the increasing oppression of Jews by the Nazi regime, in 1938 Meyerhof emigrated with his family to Paris. After the fall of France in 1940, they fled to Marseille. Aided by the Emergency Rescue Committee, they left the country by ship to the United States that year. Meyerhof was appointed to a guest professorship at the University of Pennsylvania in Philadelphia.

Meyerhof died in Philadelphia at the age of 67. In addition to receiving the Nobel Prize, he was recognized for his contributions to the study of glycolysis, by the naming of the common series of reactions for the pathway in Eukaryotes as the Embden–Meyerhof–Parnas Pathway.

== See also ==
- List of Jewish Nobel laureates
