= Gerda Mayer =

English poet (1927–2021)

- Born: 9 June 1927; Karlovy Vary, Czechoslovakia
- Died: 15 July 2021 (aged 94); Chingford, London, England
- Occupations: Poet, writer
- Spouse: Adolf (Dolfi) Mayer (d. 2009)

Gerda Kamilla Mayer (9 June 1927 – 15 July 2021) was an English poet. Born to a Jewish family in Karlovy Vary, Czechoslovakia, she escaped to England from Prague in 1939, aged eleven, on a Kindertransport flight organised by Trevor Chadwick. Having composed her first poem, in German, at the age of four, she continued her education in Dorset and Surrey and began writing poetry in English. She has published several volumes of verse and her poems have appeared in many anthologies. She has been described by Carol Ann Duffy as a fine poet "who should be better known."

== Early life ==
Mayer was born in 1927 in Karlovy Vary, a spa city in the then mostly German-speaking Sudetenland area of Czechoslovakia. Her father, Arnold Stein, had a small shop in the town selling ladies' coats and dresses, and her mother Erna (née Eisenberger) owned a knitwear business there. Mayer had an elder half-sister Johanna from her mother's previous marriage to Hans Trávníček, a Roman Catholic.

The family fled east to Prague in September 1938, shortly before the Nazi annexation of the Sudetenland. The city was already home to many Jewish refugees from Germany and Austria, and Mayer's parents spent the next six months chasing between official offices and consulates in a vain attempt to emigrate. As a last resort, in February 1939 her father made a direct approach to Trevor Chadwick, an Englishman who was organising the Prague end of an operation to rescue children at risk from the Nazis.

This rescue operation was part of a wider project set up in October 1938 by Doreen Warriner, with later assistance from the British Committee for Refugees from Czechoslovakia (BCRC), aimed initially at helping exiled anti-Nazi Sudeten leaders to escape the country. As the scope of the project expanded to include these leaders' families, the responsibility for evacuating refugee children was taken on by Nicholas Winton who had come to Prague just before Christmas 1938 to help with the rescue. After weeks dealing with various agencies and interviewing candidate families, Winton returned to London to find guarantors for the children and deal with the sluggish British authorities. Before giving any child a permit for entry to Britain the Home Office needed a guarantor, in this case a person or organisation willing to keep and educate the child up to the age of seventeen and pay £50 to cover the cost of their eventual repatriation. This is equivalent to £2,826 in 2025. Trevor Chadwick had originally gone to Prague to select two boys to be looked after at his family's preparatory school in Swanage, Dorset. Soon after delivering them, however, he decided to return to the city to help with the evacuation of other children. He remained in Prague until June 1939 and organised a number of Kindertransport trains, working in partnership with Winton at the London end.

Chadwick found a place for Mayer on a flight to Britain which left Ruzyně Airport on 14 March 1939, one day before German troops marched into Prague. He also arranged for her to be sponsored by his widowed mother and to live, at first, with his own family in Swanage. The dedication in Mayer's 1988 collection A Heartache of Grass is "to the memory of Muriel Chadwick and her son Trevor Chadwick to whom I owe my preservation".

Mayer's father Arnold was sent to the Nisko concentration camp in Poland in 1939. He escaped and made his way to Soviet-occupied Lemberg/Lwów, joining Soviet forces fighting on the Eastern Front. His last letter to his daughter was written in June 1940. Interviewed in 2010 for a Channel 5 (UK) documentary, Mayer describes how her father and a few companions were initially welcomed by the Russians. But she learned after the war that he had subsequently been sent to a Soviet labour camp where she believes he perished. Her mother Erna was sent to the Theresienstadt concentration camp in October 1942, and then the following year to Auschwitz where she too died. Mayer's half-sister Johanna was half-Jewish and survived the war, working as a bank clerk in Prague. After the war she suffered from mental illness and was hospitalised in East Germany. Johanna died in 2007.

== England ==
Upon arrival at Croydon Airport to the south of London, Mayer and another girl, Hanna Stern, left the other refugee children and travelled down to Dorset by car with Hanna's guarantors. Mayer was taken to Chadwick's family home in Swanage where she was welcomed by his wife. Chadwick had remained with the main group and the following day set out again for Prague, which was now under Nazi occupation. A semi-fictionalized account of Mayer's rescue is used for the character Hugo in the children's book War Games by Jenny Koralek, Chadwick's niece.

Although Mayer generally had a good relationship with her guarantor, Muriel Chadwick, they were not particularly close and in 1940 she was enrolled at a boarding school in Swanage. Here her native language meant she was wrongly perceived to be German and she was then teased by the other pupils. By 1942 the school was in decline and Mayer left to become a boarder at the Stoatley Rough School in Haslemere, Surrey where she was much happier, describing it as "heavenly". This co-educational, non-denominational school had been founded in 1934 by German émigré Dr Hilde Lion and Quaker activist Bertha Bracey, to provide an education for mainly Jewish refugee children from Nazi Europe. Three of Mayer's favourite teachers there, Dr Lion (head teacher), Dr Emmy Wolff (German language and literature) and Dr. Luise Leven (music) are celebrated in her poem "A Lion, a Wolf and a Fox". Mayer finished her schooling at Stoatley Rough in 1944 aged seventeen and joined her guarantor, who by then was living at Stratford-upon-Avon.

At the beginning of 1945, Mayer left for hachsharah (preparation for kibbutz life in Palestine), working on farms in Worcestershire and Surrey. But after seventeen months she felt no vocation for life on the land and at the end of May 1946 moved to London to take up office work.

She became a naturalised British citizen in 1949 following her marriage to Adolf Mayer in September that year. He too had come to England in 1939 as a refugee, in his case from Vienna. He served in the British Army between 1940 and 1946 and then worked as an office manager. In 1960 he set up his own import business, where Mayer helped with clerical tasks whilst working on her poems.

In her thirties Mayer read for a degree at Bedford College, University of London, graduating in 1963 with a BA in English, German and History of Art. Her course included lectures at Birkbeck College given by Nikolaus Pevsner, author of the 46-volume series The Buildings of England. In late 1963 she was employed by him as a part-time research assistant on the Bedfordshire volume but the work (gathering building references from the Victoria County History) was unfulfilling, and to Pevsner's great annoyance she left after a few months to resume her writing.

Gerda Mayer died on 15 July 2021.

== Poetry ==
What he liked in her voice
was his name
called over & over
and the mirrorlike look
in the weeping eyes of his lover;
...

Changed to a flower
he stood by the river
a sad case
of rooted vanity;
he never forgave
the reflecting water
for rippling his face.

— From "Narcissus",
Monkey on the Analyst's Couch, Ceolfrith, 1980

Much of Gerda Mayer's poetry draws on the trauma of her uprooting and loss of family in 1939, but her creativity was apparent many years before that. In fact her first poem was composed when she was just four years old and was recorded by her father in a Babys Tagebuch (German equivalent of "Baby Diary"), a journal he had kept from her birth until her departure from Prague that year. At school in England her reading was soon on a par with that of her classmates but the poetry took much longer to catch up, as she recalled in 2009: "My first English poem, written at the age of twelve was no better than one I had composed (in my pre-literacy days) at the age of four ... and a poem I wrote at the age of sixteen was on a level with one I had written at the age of eleven, just before leaving home."

During the 1950s and 1960s Mayer's output increased and in 1975 her first major collection appeared in Treble Poets 2. She continued to have poems published in magazines and anthologies and appeared regularly at poetry readings, on one occasion speaking at the Aldeburgh Festival. Further collections were published including two for children, with many poems written specifically for that audience, and 2013 saw a selection of her poems translated into Norwegian. In 2005 her Prague Winter was published, a short account in prose and poetry of the events leading to Mayer's departure from Prague, and the people she left behind. On BBC radio she has featured in episodes of Poetry Now (1987) and Time for Verse (1990), when Carol Ann Duffy presented poems written and read by Mayer.

Mayer's most powerful poems speak of loss and longing, and express a deep sadness. The poet Elaine Feinstein for example observed in a 1996 review that "most readers ... will have paused over that poignant poem, 'Make Believe'", in which Mayer imagines her father alive again. There is a wistfulness, too, when she writes about the countryside (of both her native and adoptive lands). These poems rarely fall into the trap of self-pity, though Mayer can veer in that direction when writing about the minor disappointments of life. In the poems "My Aunt Selfpity" and "Selfpity Again" she first identifies, then renounces, her dependence on that negative emotion to inspire her, though she also fears that without it her poems would be "bland and blank". The majority of Mayer's poems however are sharp and entertaining observations of familiar human foibles, domestic life and growing old grudgingly. Her wry sense of humour is never far away, and in poems such as "The Poetry Reading" and "Drip Drip or Not Bloody Likely" she is quite happy to take aim at the poetry scene and fellow poets.

=== Style and reception ===
In some poems, such as "Poetry Doesn't Move", Mayer doubts her talent, and she is sometimes inclined to agree with her father who once told her despairingly: "Nothing will ever become of you." Critical reaction, however, has been far more positive:

One of the most tactful namers of the Holocaust ... but her poems of everyday disenchantment are deepened by a powerful bitterness. She is funny but never a stand-up comedian. Like Stevie Smith she writes children's rhymes for grown-ups.

— Peter Porter

These poems are fun to read and evoke memories of the bedtime stories of childhood, deliciously balanced between cosiness and fear. ... Some poems are bawdy, some bizzare; all seize their meaning confidently, without inhibition. ... She has the gift of debunking seriousness and poetic preciousness. There is sadness too ...

— Maureen Watson

Reading Mayer frequently feels like reading William Blake's Songs of Experience (1794). Take, for example, "Children with Candles" (Bernini's Cat, p.90): ... Here, as in Blake's poems, the vulnerability of innocence is juxtaposed with brutal experience. Blake's romantic faith in social amelioration has, however, been superseded by Mayer's post-Holocaust apprehension that innocence is likely to be repaid with destruction.

— Peter Lawson

The sadness of her European uprooting haunts all her poems; yet ... she speaks of a bitterness and loneliness that has bodied itself in very local forms. The tradition she works best in is altogether English, that is to say, often whimsical or playing with fairytale metaphor, sometimes using nursery rhyme and rhythms, sometimes, as in "The Lumpy and Oafish Girl", declaring her debt to Stevie Smith, a poet with whom she has more than once been appropriately compared.

— Elaine Feinstein

Gerda Mayer's poems of return, like all her writings, seem simple and plainly done. There are no great flourishes or turns of style, and her poems may look lightly or casually written. But they have a powerful, ironic, pouncing effect, which is hard to describe but easy to feel. ... This seems to me poetry of unmistakable high quality; measured and sustained.

— A. C. Jacobs

== Works ==
=== Collections ===
- 1970: Oddments, (self-published)
- 1972: Gerda Mayer's Library Folder (illustrated by Deirdre Farrell), All In (Nina Steane)
- 1973: Poet Tree Centaur: A Walthamstow Group Anthology (edited by Gerda Mayer), Oddments
- 1975: Treble Poets 2 (Florence Elon, Daniel Halpern, Gerda Mayer), Chatto & Windus
- 1980: Monkey on the Analyst's Couch, Ceolfrith Press (a Poetry Book Society recommendation)
- 1985: March Postman, Priapus Press
- 1988: A Heartache of Grass, Peterloo Poets
- 1995: Time Watching, Hearing Eye
- 1999: Bernini's Cat: New and Selected Poems, IRON Press
- 2003: Hop Pickers' Holiday, The Happy Dragons Press
- 2013: Alle Blad Har Mist Sitt Tre (All the Leaves have Lost their Trees), Nordsjoforlaget (Norwegian translation by Odveig Klyve)

=== Collections for children ===
- 1978: The Knockabout Show, Chatto & Windus
- 1984: The Candy-Floss Tree (Norman Nicholson, Gerda Mayer, Frank Flynn), Oxford University Press

=== Autobiography ===
- 2005: Prague Winter, Hearing Eye
