= Nicholas Winton =

British banker and humanitarian (1909–2015)

Sir Nicholas Winton MBE
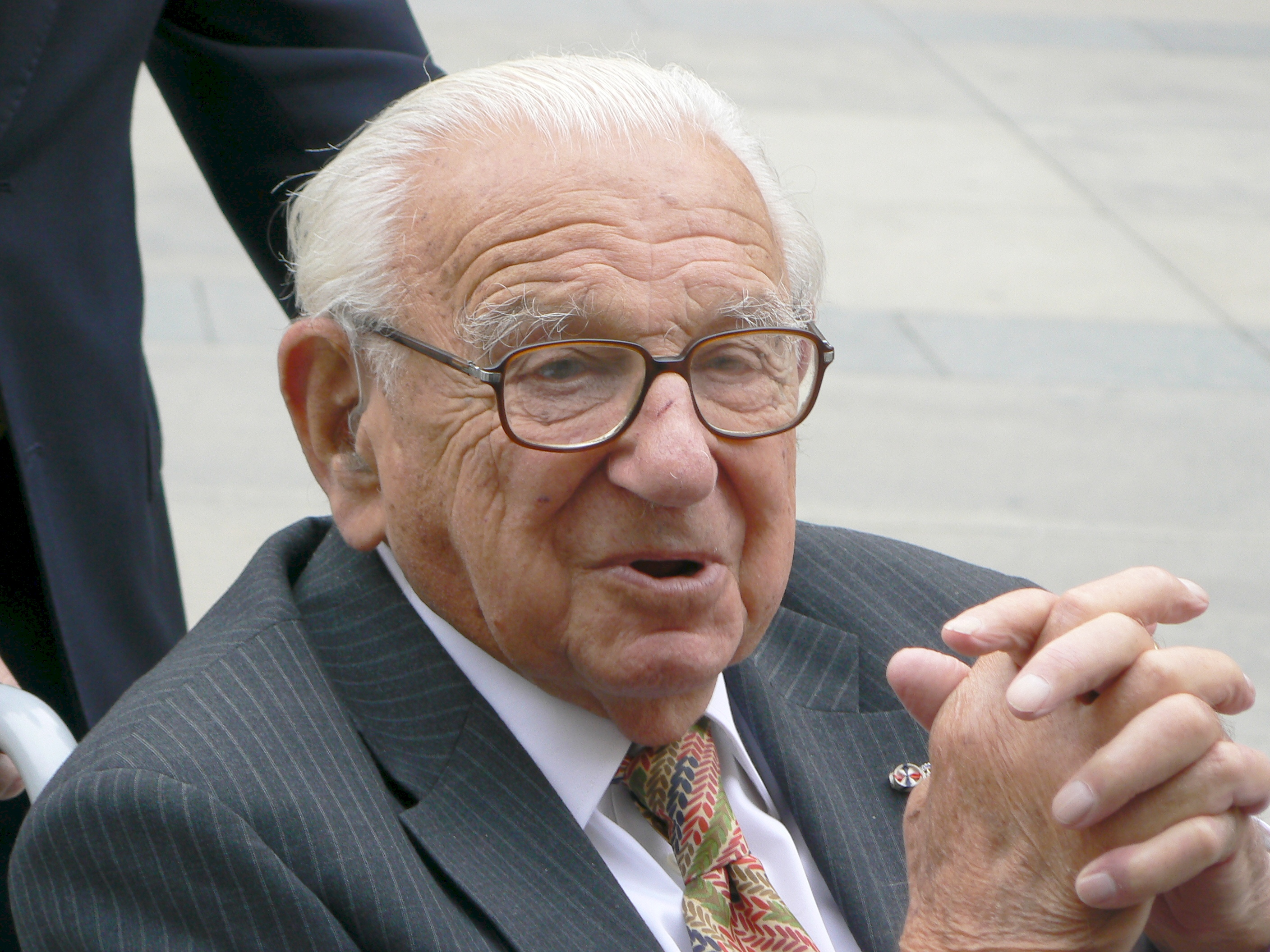
- Winton in Prague on 10 October 2007
- Born: Nicholas George Wertheim; 19 May 1909; Hampstead, London, England
- Died: 1 July 2015 (aged 106); Slough, Berkshire, England
- Resting place: Braywick Cemetery, Maidenhead, Berkshire, England
- Occupations: Stockbroker and banker
- Spouse: Grete Gjelstrup (m. 1948; died 1999)
- Children: 3
- Military career
- Allegiance: United Kingdom
- Branch: Royal Air Force
- Service years: 1940–1954
- Rank: Flight lieutenant
- Awards: British Hero of the Holocaust; Order of the White Lion
- Website: nicholaswinton.com

Sir Nicholas George Winton (né Wertheim; 19 May 1909 – 1 July 2015) was a British stockbroker and humanitarian who helped to rescue refugee children, mostly Jewish, whose families had fled persecution by Nazi Germany. Born to German-Jewish parents who had immigrated to Britain at the beginning of the 20th century, Winton assisted in the rescue of 669 children from Czechoslovakia on the eve of the Second World War. On a brief visit to Czechoslovakia, he helped compile a list of children in danger and, upon returning to Britain, he worked to fulfill the legal requirements of bringing the children to Britain and finding homes and sponsors for them. This operation was later known as the Czech Kindertransport (German for 'children's transport').

His humanitarian accomplishments remained unknown and unnoticed by the world for nearly 50 years until 1988 when he was invited to the BBC television programme That's Life!, where he was reunited with dozens of the children he had helped come to Britain and was introduced to many of their children and grandchildren. The British press celebrated him and dubbed him the "British Schindler". In 2003, Winton was knighted by Queen Elizabeth II for "services to humanity, in saving Jewish children from Nazi-occupied Czechoslovakia". In 2014, he was awarded the highest honour of the Czech Republic, the Order of the White Lion (1st class), by Czech President Miloš Zeman. Winton died in 2015, aged 106.

== Early life ==
Winton was born on 19 May 1909 in Hampstead, London, to Ashkenazi Jewish parents Rudolph Wertheim, a bank manager, and Barbara (née Wertheimer), as the middle of three children. His elder sister was Charlotte and his younger brother was Robert. His parents were German Jews who had moved to London two years earlier. The family name was Wertheim, but they changed it to Winton in an effort at integration. They also converted to Christianity, and Winton was baptised. His mother was the sister of the psychiatrists Fredric Wertham and Ida Macalpine.

In 1923, Winton entered Stowe School, which had just opened. He left without qualifications, attending night school while volunteering at the Midland Bank. He then went to Hamburg, where he worked at Behrens Bank, followed by Wassermann Bank in Berlin. In 1931, he moved to France and worked for the Banque Nationale de Crédit in Paris. He also earned a banking qualification in France. Returning to London, he became a broker at the London Stock Exchange. Though a stockbroker, Winton was also "an ardent socialist who became close to Labour Party luminaries Aneurin Bevan, Jennie Lee and Tom Driberg". Through another socialist friend, Martin Blake, Winton became part of a left-wing circle opposed to appeasement and concerned about the dangers posed by the Nazis.

At school, he had become a successful fencer, fencing both foil and épée, and was selected for the British team in 1938. He had hoped to compete in the 1940 Olympics, but the games were cancelled because of the Second World War.

== Rescue work ==
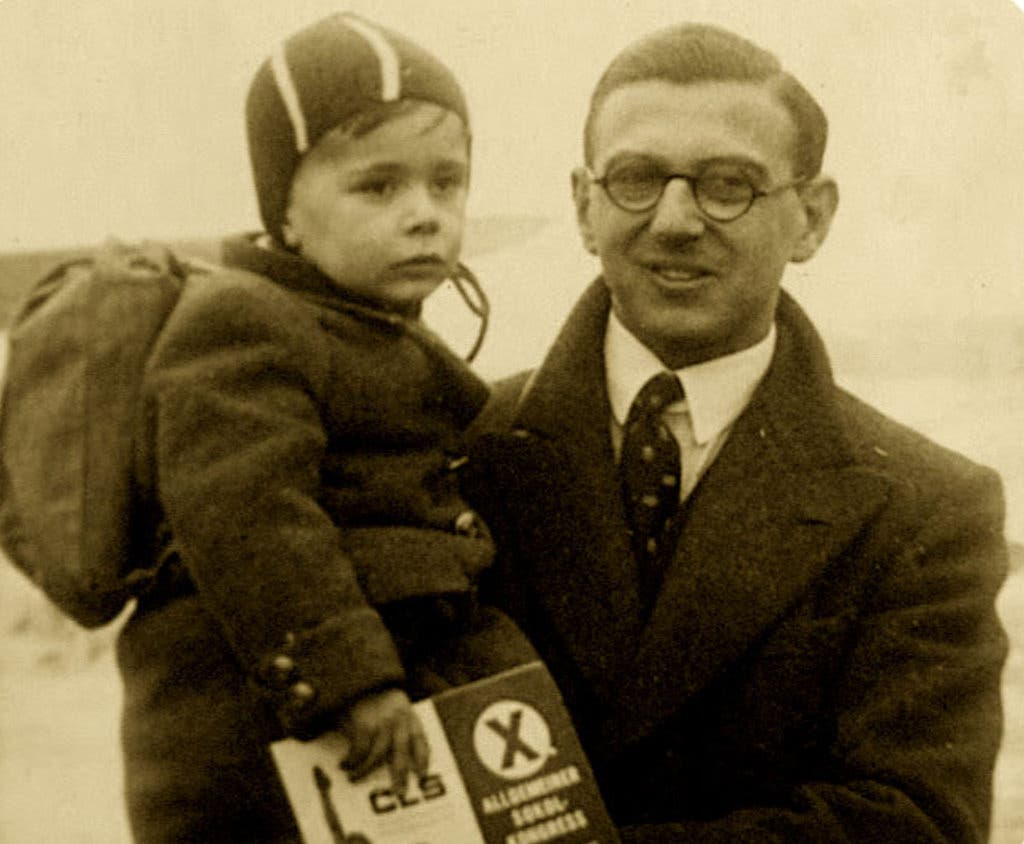
Nicholas Winton in 1938 with Hansi

Jewish children leave Prague for Croydon Airport, Britain, on a DC-2. Winton appears towards the end of the video, wearing glasses.

Shortly before Christmas 1938, Winton was planning to travel to Switzerland for a skiing holiday. Following a call for help from Marie Schmolka and Doreen Warriner, he decided instead to visit Prague and help Martin Blake, who was in Prague as an associate of the British Committee for Refugees from Czechoslovakia, then in the process of being occupied by Germany, and had called Winton to ask him to assist in Jewish welfare work. Alongside the Czechoslovak Refugee Committee, the British and Canadian volunteers such as Winton, Trevor Chadwick, and Beatrice Wellington worked in organising to aid children from families at risk from the Nazis. Many of them set up their office at a dining room table in a hotel in Wenceslas Square. Americans Waitstill and Martha Sharp and British Quaker Tessa Rowntree were important members of the team that evacuated children and other refugees from Czechoslovakia.

Altogether, Winton spent three weeks in Prague and left in January 1939, two months before the German occupation of Czechoslovakia. Other foreign volunteers remained, such as Chadwick, Warriner, Wellington, the Sharps, and Rowntree. In November 1938, following Kristallnacht in Nazi-ruled Germany, the House of Commons approved a measure to allow the entry into Britain of refugees younger than 17, provided they had a place to stay and a warranty of £50 (equivalent to £2,910 in 2025) was deposited per person for their eventual return to their own country.

=== Netherlands ===
An important obstacle was getting official permission to cross into the Netherlands, as the children were to embark on the ferry at The Hook of Holland. Following Kristallnacht in November 1938, the Dutch government officially closed its borders to any Jewish refugees. The Royal Netherlands Marechaussee searched for them and returned any found to Germany, despite the horrors of Kristallnacht being well known.

Winton succeeded, thanks to the guarantees he had obtained from Britain. Following the first train-full of refugees to the Netherlands, escorted by Quaker Tessa Rowntree, the process of crossing went smoothly. Winton ultimately found homes in Britain for 669 children, many of whose parents perished in the Auschwitz concentration camp. His mother worked with him to place the children in homes and later hostels. Throughout the summer of 1939, he placed photographs of the children in Picture Post seeking families to accept them. By coincidence, the names of the London and North Eastern Railway steamers which operated the Harwich to The Hook of Holland route included the Prague and the Vienna; the former can be seen in a 1938 Pathé Newsreel.

He also wrote to U.S. politicians such as President Franklin D. Roosevelt, asking them to take more children. He said that two thousand more might have been saved if they had helped, but only Sweden took any besides those sent to Britain. The last group of children, scheduled to leave Prague on 1 September 1939, was unable to depart. With Hitler's invasion of Poland on the same day, the Second World War had begun. Of the 250 children due to leave on that train, only two survived the war.

Winton acknowledged the vital roles in Prague of Doreen Warriner, Trevor Chadwick, Nicholas Stopford, Beatrice Wellington, Josephine Pike and Bill Barazetti (1914–2000), who were the people who organized the evacuation of refugees, including the children, from Czechoslovakia. Winton stayed in Prague only about three weeks and left before the Nazis occupied the country. He never set foot in the Prague main railway station, although a statue of him is erected there. He later wrote that Chadwick "then went to work and dealt with all the considerable problems at the Prague end and this work he continued to carry on even when it became difficult and dangerous when the Germans arrived. He deserves all praise".

=== Notable people saved ===
- Alf Dubs, Baron Dubs (born 1932), British Labour Party politician and former Member of Parliament
- Heini Halberstam (1926–2014), mathematician
- Renata Laxova (1931–2020), paediatric geneticist
- Gerda Mayer (1927–2021), poet
- Karel Reisz (1926–2002), filmmaker
- Joe Schlesinger (1928–2019), Canadian television journalist and author
- Yitzchok Tuvia Weiss (1926–2022), Chief Rabbi of the Edah HaChareidis in Jerusalem
- Vera Gissing (1928–2022), writer and translator

Of the 669 children saved from the Holocaust through Winton's efforts, more than 370 have never been traced. BBC News suggested in 2015 that they may not know the full story of how they survived the war.

== Second World War ==
Following the outbreak of the Second World War, Winton initially declined to be conscripted into the British Army, applying successfully for registration as a conscientious objector. He served with an Air Raid Precautions section and a British Red Cross ambulance unit.

In 1940, he rescinded his objections and joined the Royal Air Force, Administrative and Special Duties Branch. Initially he was an aircraftman, rising to sergeant and on 22 June 1944 he was commissioned as an acting pilot officer on probation. On 17 August 1944, he was promoted to pilot officer on probation.

He was promoted to the war substantive rank of flying officer on 17 February 1945, staying in the Air Force after the war. He relinquished his commission on 19 May 1954, retaining the honorary rank of flight lieutenant.

== Postwar ==
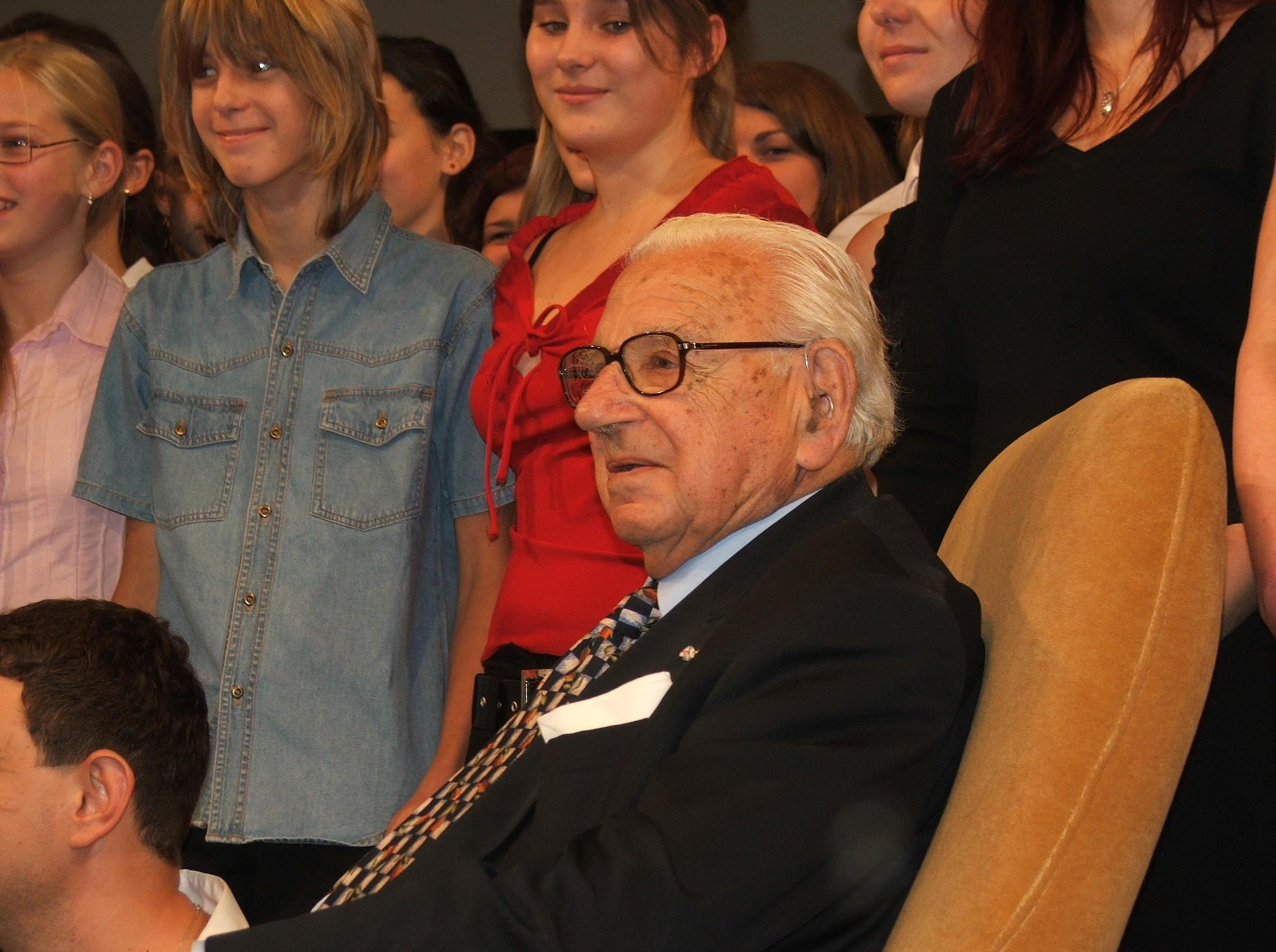
Winton visiting Prague in October 2007.

=== Family life ===
Following the war, Winton worked for the International Refugee Organization and then the International Bank for Reconstruction and Development in Paris, where he met Grete Gjelstrup, a Danish secretary and accountant's daughter. They married in her hometown of Vejle, Denmark, on 31 October 1948.

They had three children: two sons, named Nicholas Jr. and Robin, and a daughter named Barbara. Their younger son Robin had Down's syndrome. The family insisted that Robin would stay with them rather than go to a residential home as was the norm at the time. Robin's death from meningitis on the day before his sixth birthday affected Winton greatly and he founded a local support organisation which became Maidenhead Mencap. Winton stood, unsuccessfully, for the town council in 1954; he later found work in the finance departments of various companies.

=== Recognition ===
Winton mentioned his humanitarian accomplishments in his election material while unsuccessfully standing for election to Maidenhead Town Council in 1954. Otherwise, he went unnoticed for half a century until in 1988 his wife found a detailed scrapbook in their attic, containing lists of the children, including their parents' names and the names and addresses of the families that took them in. He gave the scrapbook to Elisabeth Maxwell, a Holocaust researcher and wife of media magnate Robert Maxwell. Letters were sent to each of these known addresses and 80 of "Winton's children" were found in Britain. In a 2017 interview on the BBC Radio 4 programme The Life Scientific, Simon Wessely described how his father Rudi, one of the rescued children, had a chance encounter with Winton.

The wider world found out about his work in February 1988 during an episode of the BBC television programme That's Life! when he was invited as a member of the audience. At one point, Winton's scrapbook was shown and his achievements were explained. The host of the programme, Esther Rantzen, introduced Winton to children he had helped to rescue, including Vera Gissen.

In a later, follow-up That's Life! programme at which Winton was also in the audience, Rantzen asked whether anybody in the audience was among the children who owed their lives to Winton, and if so, to stand: more than two dozen people surrounding Winton rose and applauded. Rantzen then asked if anyone present was the child or grandchild of one of the children Winton saved, and the rest of the audience stood.

Winton was the subject of This Is Your Life in 2003 when he was surprised by Michael Aspel at Winton House, an Abbeyfield Society care home in Windsor, Berkshire, named in his honour.

By the time Winton's work became known in 1988, most of the people who worked for the kindertransport in Czechoslovakia had died unrecognised. Despite widespread praise for his work, two scholars have attempted to highlight that his accomplishments were a group effort, writing about the situation "... We should not reduce the account to just one saint."

Winton and his brother Robert started an inter-regional fencing competition in 1950. The Winton Cup continued and celebrated its belated 70th anniversary in 2022 due to postponements during the COVID-19 pandemic. His children and grandchildren make regular guest appearances each year.

The Israeli Airforce Special Rescue Unit 669 is named as a tribute to the 669 lives saved by Winton.

=== 100th birthday ===
To celebrate his 100th birthday, Winton flew over the White Waltham Airfield in a microlight piloted by Judy Leden, the daughter of one of the boys he saved. His birthday was also marked by the publication of a profile in The Jewish Chronicle.

In 2014, a book entitled If it's Not Impossible... The Life of Sir Nicholas Winton, written by his daughter Barbara Winton, was published.

== Death ==
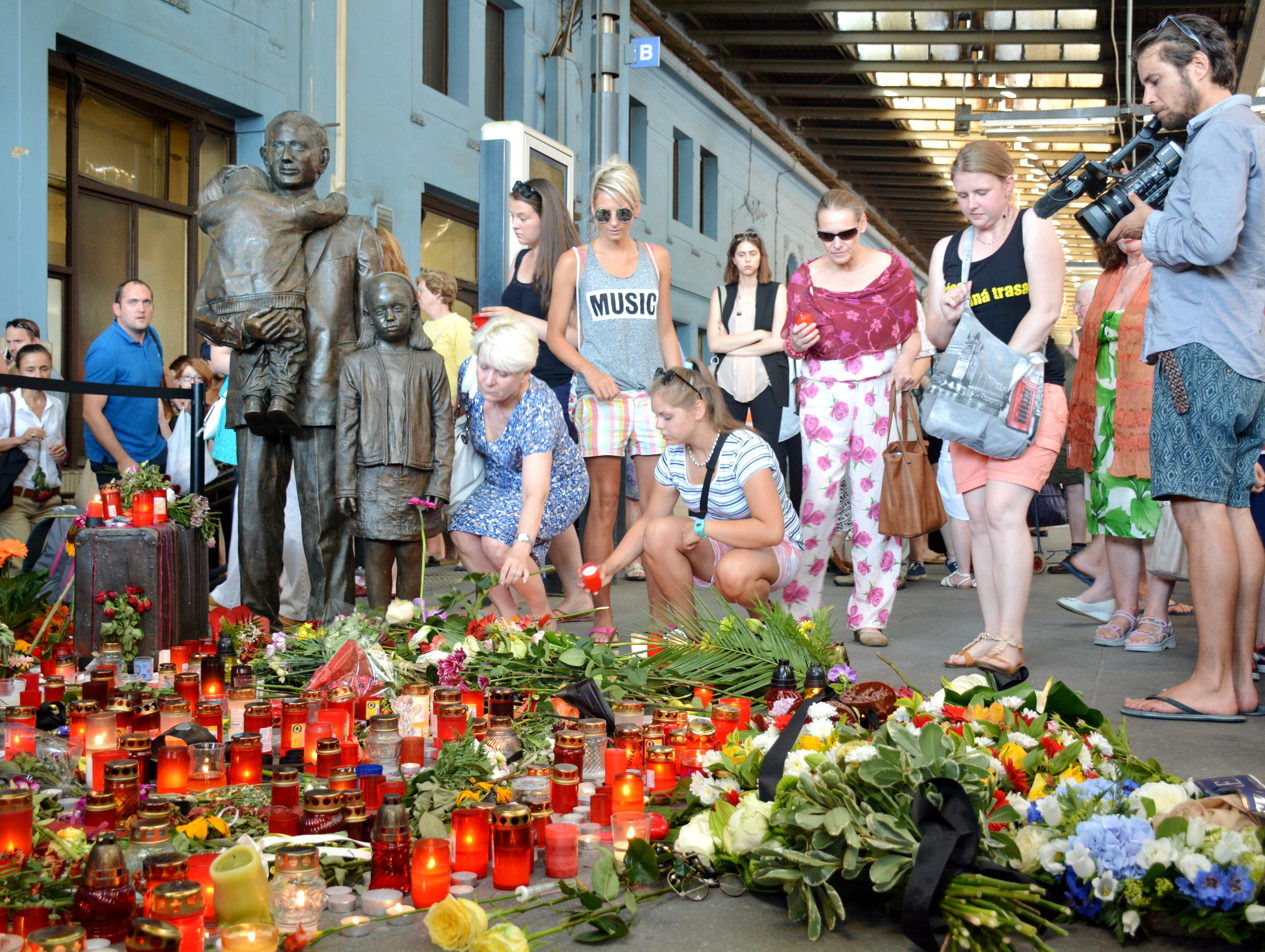
Commemorative event, in July 2015, at the Prague Main Railway Station sculpture

Winton died in his sleep from cardiac arrest on the morning of 1 July 2015 at Wexham Park Hospital in Slough, having been admitted a week earlier following a deterioration in his health. He was 106 years old. Winton was cremated and his ashes were buried at Braywick Cemetery in Maidenhead, Berkshire, alongside his wife Grete and son Robin.

Winton's death came 76 years to the day after 241 of the children he saved left Prague on a train. A special report from the BBC News on several of the children whom Winton rescued during the war had been published earlier that day.

== Honours ==
In the 1983 Birthday Honours, Winton was appointed a Member of the Order of the British Empire (MBE) for "services to the community in Maidenhead, Berkshire". In the 2003 New Year Honours, he was knighted for "services to humanity, in saving Jewish Children from Nazi-occupied Czechoslovakia, 1938–39". He met the Queen again during her state visit to Bratislava, Slovakia, in October 2008. In 2003, Winton received the Pride of Britain Award for Lifetime Achievement. In 2010, Winton was named a British Hero of the Holocaust by the British Government.

Winton was awarded the Order of Tomáš Garrigue Masaryk, Fourth Class, by the Czech President Václav Havel in 1998. In 2008, he was honoured by the Czech government in several ways. An elementary school in Kunžak is named after him, and he was awarded the Cross of Merit of the Minister of Defence, Grade I. The Czech government nominated him for the 2008 Nobel Peace Prize.

The minor planet 19384 Winton was named in his honour by Czech astronomers Jana Tichá and Miloš Tichý.

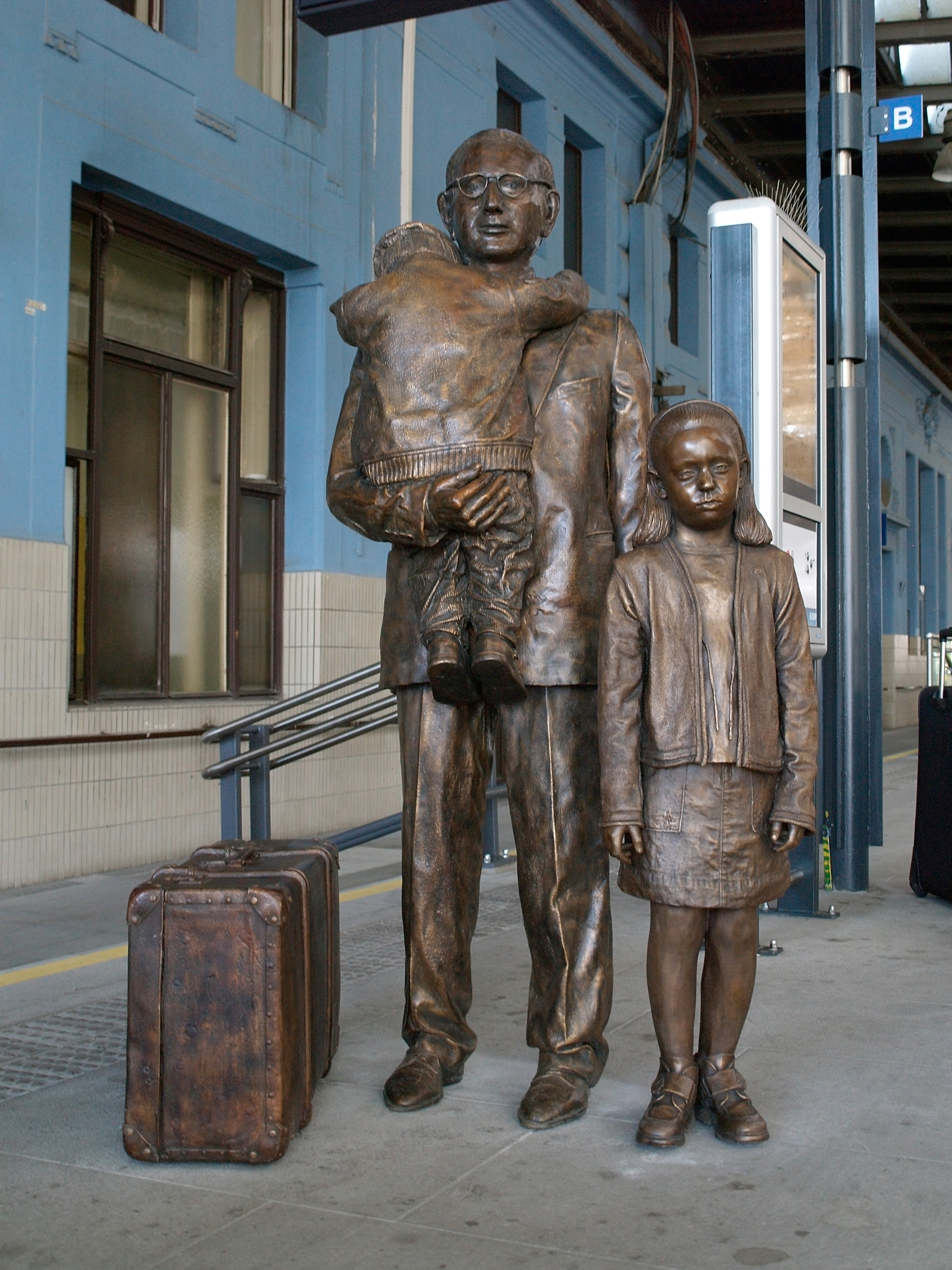
Statue at Prague main railway station, by Flor Kent, unveiled on 1 September 2009

A statue of Winton stands on Platform 1 of the Praha hlavní nádraží railway station. Created by Flor Kent, it was unveiled on 1 September 2009 as part of a larger commemoration of the 70th anniversary of the last Kindertransport train (see also Winton train, below).

There are also three memorials at Liverpool Street station in London, where the Kindertransport children arrived. In September 2010, another statue of Winton was unveiled, this time at Maidenhead railway station by Home Secretary Theresa May, MP for Maidenhead. Created by Lydia Karpinska, it depicts Winton sitting on a bench and reading a book.

Winton was a humanist and an active member of Humanists UK who described religion as a "facade", advocating for human ethics based on "goodness, kindness, love, honesty." In a 2015 interview, Winton told Stephen Sackur he had become disillusioned with religion during the war as he could not reconcile religious movements "praying for victory on both sides of the same war". Winton went on to describe his personal beliefs: "I believe in ethics, and if everybody believed in ethics we'd have no problems at all. That's the only way out; forget the religious side."

Winton received the Wallenberg Medal on 27 June 2013 in London. The following year, the International Raoul Wallenberg Foundation established a literary competition named after Winton. The contest is for essays by high school students about Winton's legacy.

Winton was awarded the Freedom of the City of London on 23 February 2015.

In 2019, his old school, Stowe, opened a new boys' day house, named Winton.

=== Winton Train ===
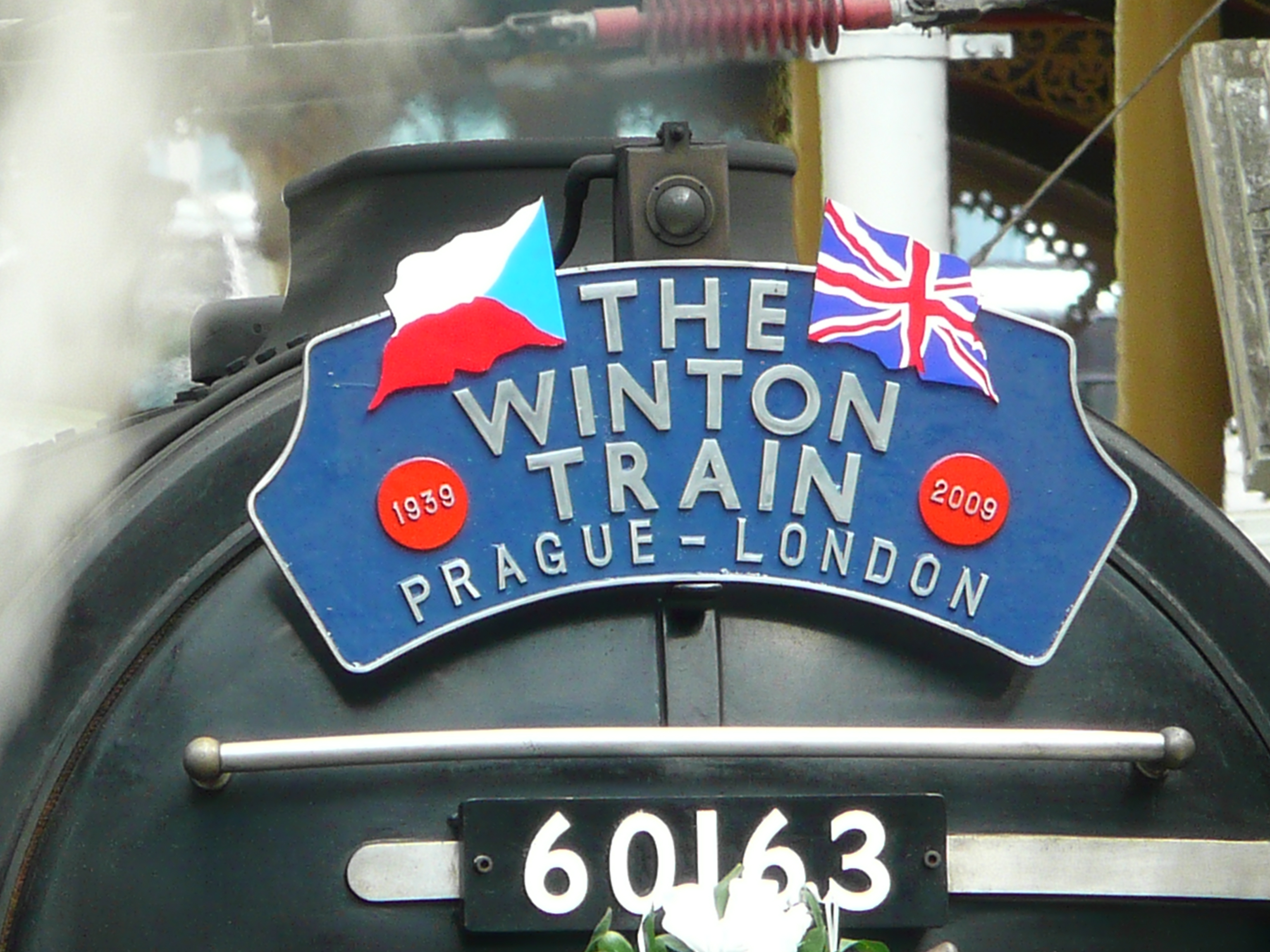
The headboard worn by No. 60163 Tornado from Harwich to Liverpool Street station, the final leg of the Winton Train from Prague

On 1 September 2009, a special "Winton Train" composed of one or two steam locomotives (out of a set of six) and carriages used in the 1930s set off from the Prague Main railway station for London via the original Kindertransport route. On board were several surviving "Winton children" and their descendants, who were welcomed by Winton in London.

The occasion marked the 70th anniversary of the final intended Kindertransport arranged by Winton, due to set off on 1 September 1939 but prevented by the outbreak of the Second World War that very day. At the train's departure, a memorial statue for Winton, designed by Flor Kent, was unveiled at the railway station.

=== Order of the White Lion ===
On 19 May 2014, Winton's 105th birthday, it was announced he was to receive the Czech Republic's highest honour, for giving Czech children "the greatest possible gift: the chance to live and to be free". On 28 October 2014, Winton was awarded the Order of the White Lion (Class I) by Czech President Miloš Zeman, the Czech Defence Ministry having sent a special aircraft to bring him to Prague. The award was made alongside one to Sir Winston Churchill, which was accepted by his grandson Nicholas Soames. Zeman said he regretted the highest Czech award having been awarded to the two personalities so belatedly, but added "better late than never". Winton was also able to meet some of the people he rescued 75 years earlier, themselves then in their 80s. He said, "I want to thank you all for this enormous expression of thanks for something which happened to me nearly 100 years ago— and 100 years is a heck of a long time. I am delighted that so many of the children are still about and are here to thank me."

=== List of national honours ===
Country	Date	Appointment	Ribbon	Post-nominal letters	Notes
United Kingdom	10 June 1983	Member of the Order of the British Empire		MBE	
Czech Republic	1998	Order of Tomáš Garrigue Masaryk, Fourth Class			
United Kingdom	31 December 2002	Knight Bachelor			
Czech Republic	2014	Order of the White Lion 1st Class			
Czech Republic	2008	Cross of Merit of the Minister of Defence, Grade I.			

== Memorials ==
On 22 April 2016, a remembrance quarter peal was rung and a new method named Sir Nicholas Winton Delight by bellringers of the Whiting Society of Ringers.

On 19 May 2016, a memorial service for Winton was held at London's Guildhall, attended by some 400 people, including 28 of those he saved, and Czech, Slovak and UK government representatives. On 20 May, military charity Glen Art presented a memorial concert celebrating Winton's life with Jason Isaacs, Rupert Graves and Alexander Baillie, at St John's, Smith Square. All funds donated were given to charities supporting Syrian refugee children.

On 14 July 2017, a memorial garden for Winton was opened in Maidenhead Oaken Grove park by Prime Minister and local Maidenhead MP Theresa May.

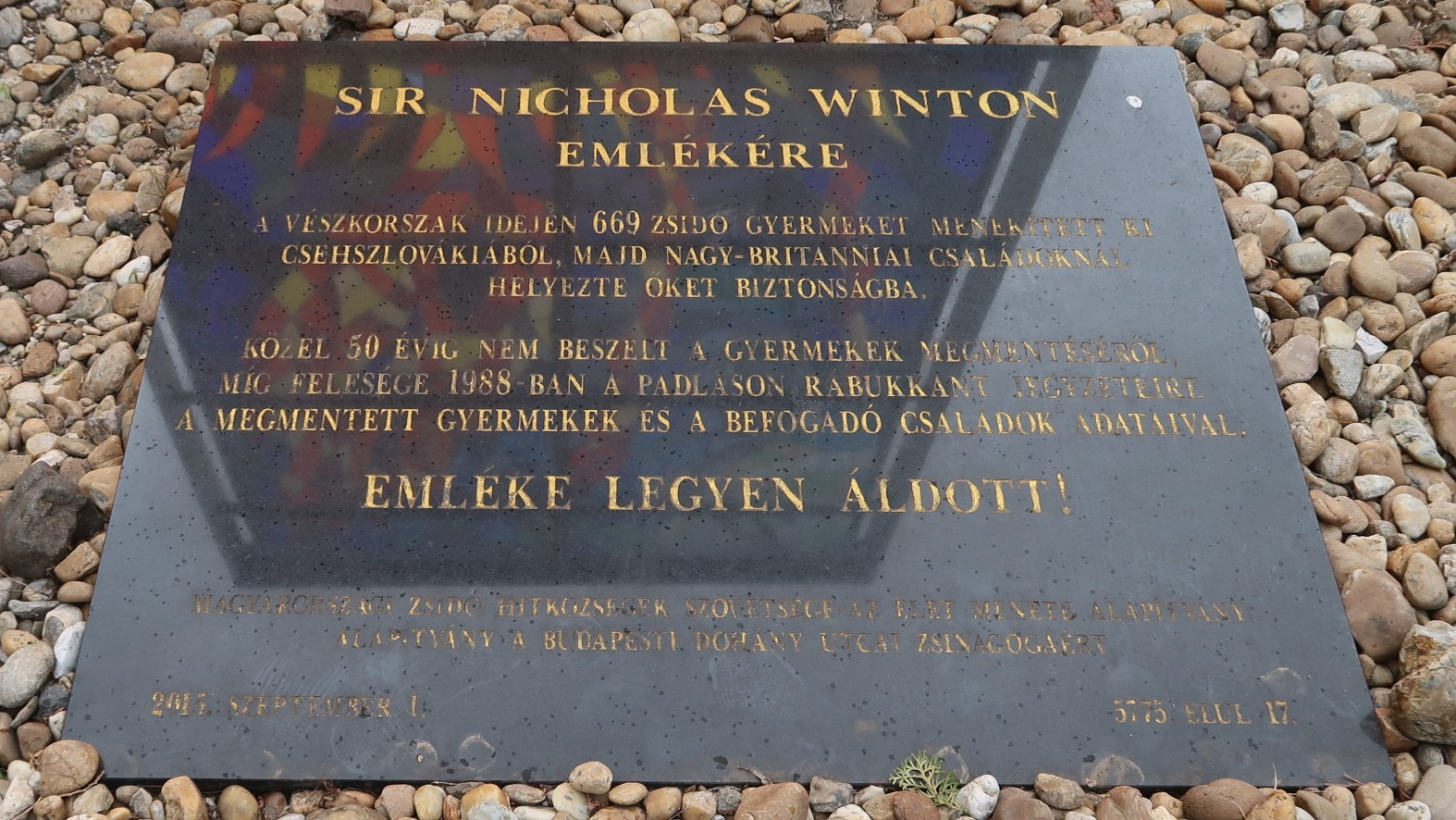
Memorial stone in the grounds of the Great Synagogue in Budapest, Hungary (2023)

== In popular culture ==
A play about Winton, Numbers from Prague, was performed in Cambridge in January 2011.

In 2019, a one-act play titled The Father of 669 was performed in the Firodiya Karandak in Pune.

Speaking on BBC Radio 4's Today programme on 28 October 2014, Winton said he thought he had "made a difference to a lot of people" and went on to say, "I don't think we've learned anything… the world today is in a more dangerous situation than it has ever been."

On 19 May 2020, Google honoured Winton's legacy on the 111th anniversary of his birth with a Google Doodle.

Winton's story was told by David Suchet as part of the 2022 Mormon Tabernacle Choir Christmas Concert, which aired on PBS in December 2023.

In November 2026, Canadian playwright and writer Noam Tomaschoff mentioned that his grandfather was one of 669 children saved in 1939 during the debut of his new musical, "Our Little Secret," at the Mirvish theatre in Toronto, Canada.

=== Films ===
Winton's work is the subject of three films by Slovak filmmaker Matej Mináč: the drama All My Loved Ones (1999), in which Winton was played by Rupert Graves; the documentary The Power of Good: Nicholas Winton (Síla lidskosti—Nicholas Winton, 2002), which won an Emmy Award; and the documentary drama Nicky's Family.

He features in Into the Arms of Strangers: Stories of the Kindertransport (2000), winner of the 2001 Academy Award for best feature documentary. It was produced by Deborah Oppenheimer and written and directed by three-time Academy Award–winning filmmaker Mark Jonathan Harris.

Anthony Hopkins and Johnny Flynn respectively play elderly and young Winton respectively in One Life. The film had its world premiere at the 2023 Toronto International Film Festival and was released in the UK on 1 January 2024 by Warner Bros. Pictures.

== See also ==
- Rescue of Jews during the Holocaust

Awards and achievements
Preceded by Maria Gunnoe	Wallenberg Medalist; 2013	Succeeded by Ágnes Heller
