= Karl Bömelburg =

German SS and Gestapo official

- Born: 28 October 1885; Elberfeld, Kingdom of Prussia, German Empire
- Died: 26 December 1947 (aged 62); Bad Tölz, Bavaria, Allied-occupied Germany
- Conviction: War crimes
- Penalty: Death (1950) (in absentia)
- SS service
- Allegiance: Nazi Germany
- Branch: Schutzstaffel
- Service years: 1931–1945
- Rank: SS-Sturmbannführer

Karl Bömelburg (28 October 1885 – 26 December 1947) was an SS-Sturmbannführer (major) and head of the Gestapo in France during the Second World War. He notably had authority over section IV J, charged with the deportation of the Jews, for which Alois Brunner (sent in 1943 by Heinrich Müller) was responsible. His aliases included Charles Bois, Mollemburg, and Bennelburger.

== Life ==
=== Before the war ===
During his youth, he spent five years in Paris, in which he learned to speak nearly perfect French. He returned to Germany, was married and began working in his parents' bakery in Berlin. In 1931, Bömelburg became a member of the National Socialist German Workers' Party (Nazi Party), joining the SA then the SS. In 1933 he joined the Gestapo, in which he became a commissary directing the Kripo in Berlin.

In 1938 he joined the staff of Joachim von Ribbentrop in Paris. At the start of November, he was put in charge of enquiries into the murder of Ernst vom Rath. When this affair was quickly resolved, he became attached to the German ambassador in Paris, setting up an unofficial Gestapo centre in Paris. He worked in Lyon and Saint-Étienne, making use of his French language ability.

In January 1939, he was expelled by Antoine Mondanel, the inspector general of the judicial police, for helping extreme-right French organisations and fifth-columnists. He moved to Prague, becoming police counsellor to the Gestapo and the head of its anti-Maquis section. After the Germans' uncontested invasion of Czechoslovakia on 15 March 1939, for a time they encouraged Jews to leave the country while opposing the emigration of "political" refugees. Bömelburg provided documents that enabled Trevor Chadwick and Beatrice Wellington of the British Committee for Refugees from Czechoslovakia to evacuate hundreds of both political and Jewish refugees, including 669 mostly Jewish children, from Nazi-occupied Czechoslovakia just prior to the beginning of World War II.

=== Paris ===
On 14 June 1940, during the German invasion of France, Bömelburg returned to France in colonel Helmut Knochen's Kommando SD and acted as Kommandeur der Sicherheitspolizei (KdS, Commander of Security Police). In August he was promoted to lieutenant colonel in the SS and had Heinrich Müller name him his personal representative and the head of the Gestapo (section IV of the BdS covering France), with the title of criminal director. His activities during the time he spent in Paris passed from repression and interrogations to the frequent use of torture in the courts by his subordinates such as Ernst Misselwitz, but also fashionable soirées and little gifts offered by Henri Lafont, derived from the black market or from war loot. One of Bömelburg's wishes was to have a poultry farm, and Henri Lafont obliged by giving him a farm near Giverny staffed by his own men. His offices were situated at 11 rue des Saussaies (1940–1942), then 84 Avenue Foch, and his adjutants included Sturmbannführer Josef Kieffer.

In 1941 he succeeded Rudy de Mérode at 43, avenue Victor-Hugo in Neuilly, in a Gasthaus (a house reserved for "forced" guests), which came to be called villa Boemelburg. He personally recruited agents, with the initial B or Boe. In summer 1941 he made a trip to the unoccupied zone to reactivate pre-war agents, and in the autumn he supervised the inquiry into Paul Collette, who had tried to assassinate Pierre Laval and Marcel Déat. During that year, he also headed up the Red Orchestra Kommando and enacted Operation Funkspiel against the workers' Soviets.

In autumn 1942 he put Aktion Donar into effect, and in June 1943 he was the last German senior officer to see Jean Moulin alive. Moulin had been arrested on 21 June at Caluire, and then spent two weeks (25 June to 8 July) at villa Boemelburg, before dying on his train journey to Berlin. In November 1943, Bömelburg reached the age limit and was replaced by an officer surnamed Stindt.

Bömelburg was transferred to Vichy, where he represented Carl Oberg, and then in June 1944 replaced SS captain Hugo Geissler (killed in an ambush near Murat) as head of the Gestapo in the southern zone of France. On 28 August that year he ensured Marshal Philippe Pétain's safe journey to Sigmaringen, as security-chief, and then on 29 April 1945 authorised Pétain's departure for Switzerland.

=== Postwar ===
In May 1945, after the German surrender, Bömelburg and his Gestapo chief in Berlin, Heinrich Müller, disappeared and were never recaptured. Bömelburg doctored the papers of a sergeant Bergman, killed in the bombardment, and adopted his identity. He was hired as a gardener near Munich, then promoted to librarian, and also directed a group of active Nazis fleeing to Francoist Spain. At Saint-Sylvestre, in 1947, he slipped on ice, broke his skull and died. Later his son, Ralf, engraved his name on the family tombstone. He was condemned to death in absentia on 2 March 1950 by a military tribunal meeting in Lyon, and the Czechoslovak authorities were also seeking him for trial for war crimes.

== See also ==
- Stille Hilfe
- Helmut Knochen

== Bibliography ==
- Jacques Delarue, Histoire de la Gestapo Ed. Fayard, 1962.
- Jean Paul Cointet, Sigmaringen Ed. Perrin, 2003, ISBN 2-262-01823-5.
- Cyril Eder, Les Comtesses de la Gestapo Ed. Grasset, 2007, ISBN 978-2-246-67401-6.
- Patrice Miannay, Dictionnaire des agents doubles dans la Résistance, le cherche midi, 2005, ISBN 2-7491-0456-4.
- Jean Lartéguy and Bob Maloubier, Triple jeu, l'espion Déricourt, Robert Laffont, 1992.
- Monika Siedentopf, Parachutées en terre ennemie, Perrin, 2008. See p. 97.
