= Recreation Ground, Swanage =

Public park in Swanage, Dorset, England

Coordinates: 50.610965°N 1.9585812°W

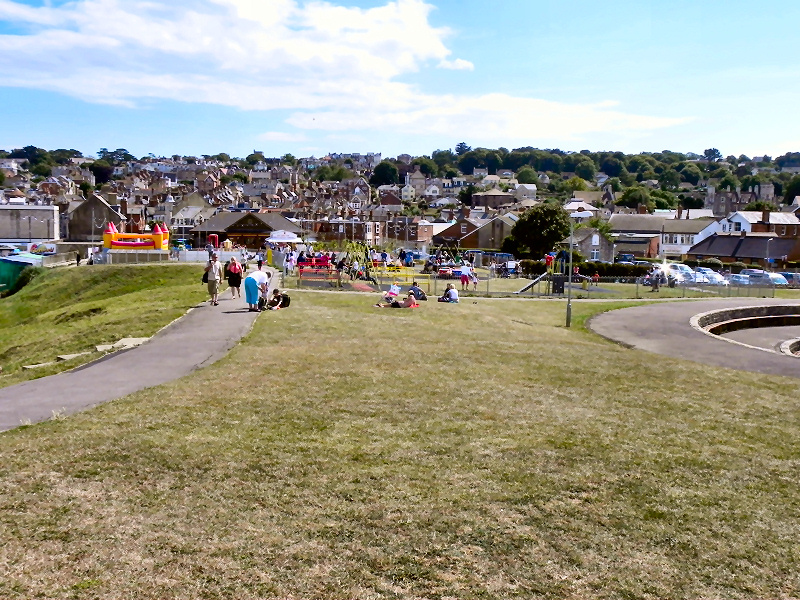
The Recreation Ground in 2010

The Recreation Ground is a public park in Swanage, Dorset. It was acquired prior to WWI, but only properly established in the 1920s.

== History ==
The land which is now the recreation ground was previously occupied by Eastbrook Farm. Although acquired before WWI, it was only after the War that it was turned into the recreation ground, with the war memorial being unveiled in 1920 and the bandstand installed in 1923. As originally laid out, the recreation ground also included tennis courts and a bowling green.

== Bandstand ==
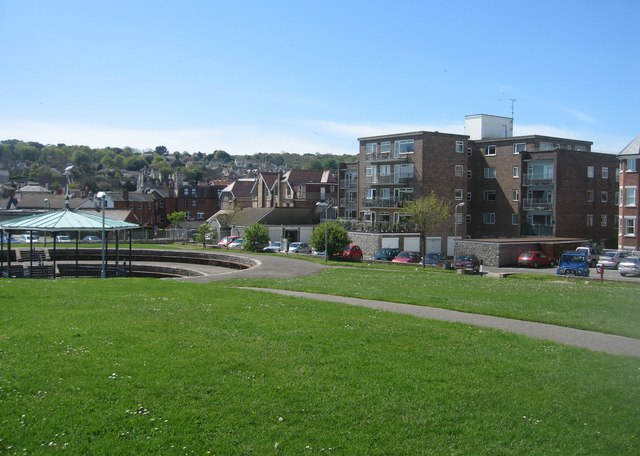
The bandstand in 2009, before storm damage in 2012

The bandstand was installed in 1923, in a sunken location to assist with acoustics in the open air. It was made by Scottish cast iron manufacturers, Walter Macfarlane & Co, to a design known as a MacFarlane 224. It is one of only four surviving MacFarlane 224s, the other three being in the Royal Pump Room Gardens in Leamington Spa, Fassnidge Park in Uxbridge and the Vine Cricket Ground in Sevenoaks. Following storm damage in 2012, the roof was removed. It was restored in 2019 by Lost Art Limited, and the original finial was reinstated.

The Swanage Town Band perform concerts at the bandstand. There is a Friends of Swanage Bandstand group.

== War memorial ==
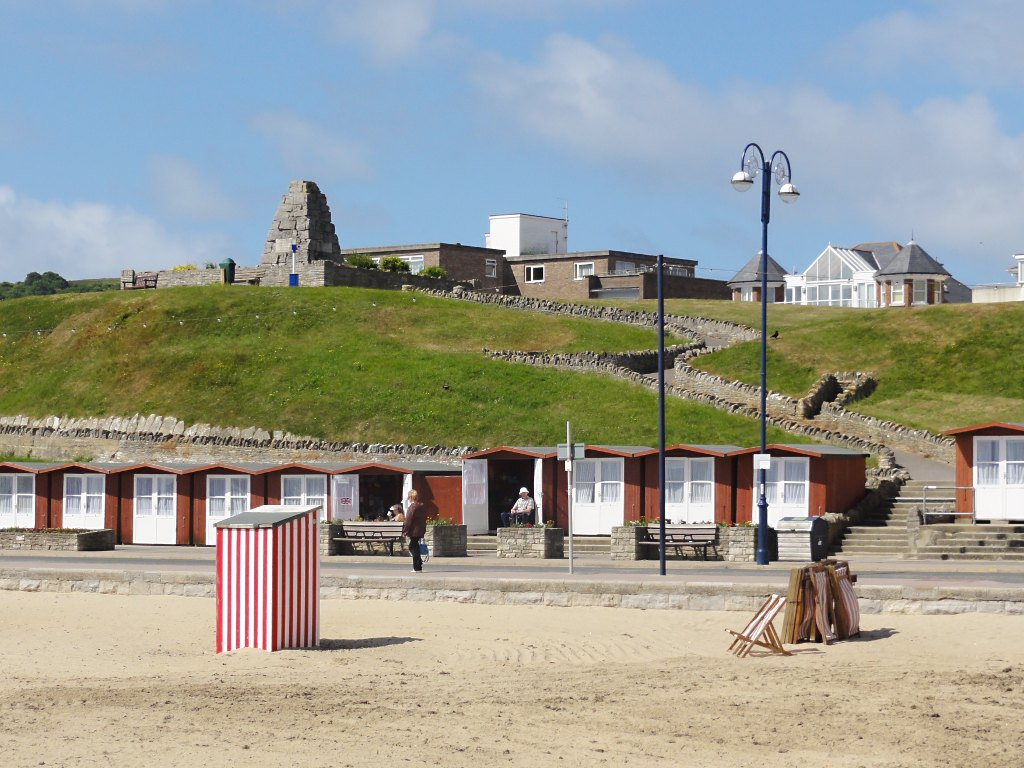
The war memorial from the beach in 2011, prior to its relocation within the Recreation Ground

The war memorial was erected in 1920, and relocated within the recreation ground in 2014 in order to reduce the risk of it collapsing in a landslip. It is constructed from Purbeck stone and is Grade II listed. It is in the form of a tapering cairn. In addition to listing the war dead, the war memorial also lists civilians killed by enemy bombs in the town in WWII.

== Trevor Chadwick ==
Trevor Chadwick was a schoolteacher in Swanage who, working with Sir Nicholas Winton, was responsible for rescuing 669 children from Prague on the kindertransport. As part of the objective of the Trevor Chadwick Memorial Trust to perpetuate the memory of Chadwick's work, the children's playground in the recreation ground has been renamed the Chadwick children's playground. A bronze sculpture of Chadwick with two children by local sculptor Moira Purver has been designed and will shortly (2021) be cast and then installed in the recreation ground.
