= Trevor Chadwick =

British humanitarian (1907–1979)

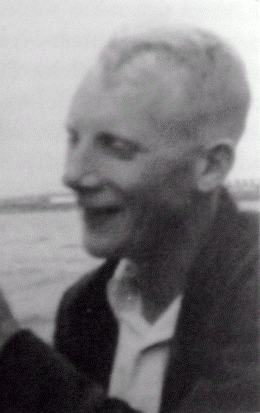
- Trevor Chadwick in c 1935
- Born: 22 April 1907
- Died: 23 December 1979 (aged 72)
- Relatives: Charles Chadwick (son)

Trevor Chadwick (22 April 1907 – 23 December 1979) was a British humanitarian who was involved in the Kindertransport to rescue Jews and other refugee children in Czechoslovakia in 1938–1939 before World War II. After the Munich Agreement, in 1938 Nazi Germany annexed Sudetenland from Czechoslovakia and occupied the whole Czech part of Czechoslovakia in 1939. The children were mostly resettled with families in the United Kingdom.

In 2018, Chadwick was posthumously named a British Hero of the Holocaust.

== Early life ==
He attended Oxford University where he was the captain of a rugby team and graduated in 1928 with a third in jurisprudence. His family and friends believed he should have done better. He was a troublesome youth and had a fondness for alcohol. After graduation, he joined the Colonial Service and worked in Nigeria for 18 months. He became a Latin teacher at his family's school in Swanage, Dorset and married in 1931. He was regarded as kind and considerate of others, but unruly and unconventional personally. Chadwick was described by the poet Gerda Mayer, one of the Jewish children he escorted to Britain, as tall and handsome, casual and self-assured.

== Chadwick and the kindertransport ==
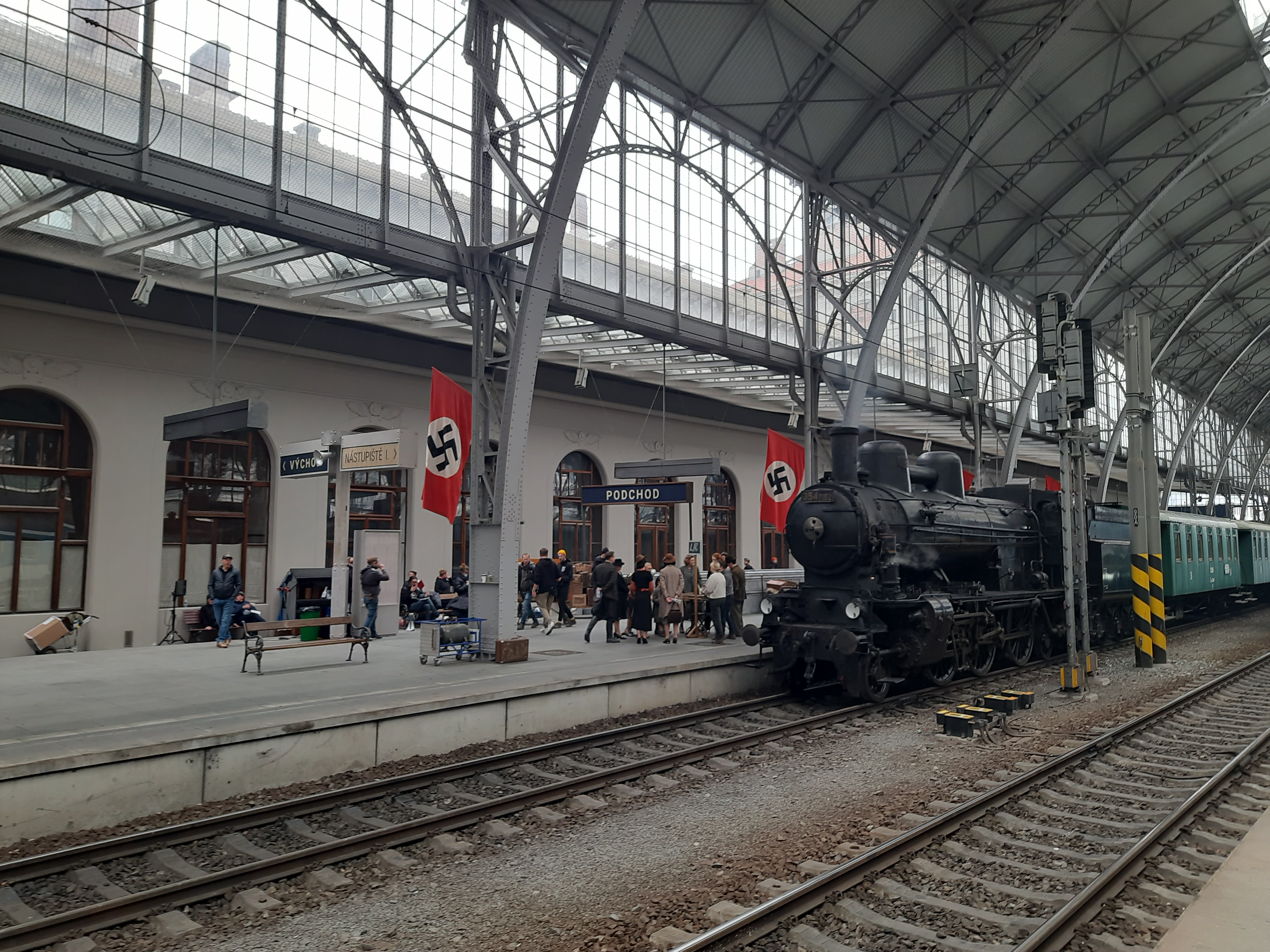
The Prague train station as portrayed in the movie One Life

In January 1939, Chadwick journeyed to Czechoslovakia to accompany two refugee children back to Britain where they had been admitted to his school. He met another refugee child, Gerda Mayer, in Prague, interviewed her and her family, and took her along with the other two children. Chadwick's mother sponsored Mayer, putting up the guarantee of 50 pounds which the British government required to admit refugee children to Britain. Chadwick described his initial reaction to the situation in Prague: "We got a clear impression of the enormity of the task. We so often saw halls of confused refugees and batches of lost children, mostly Jewish, and we saw only the fringe of it all."

After delivering the first three children to Britain, Chadwick returned to Czechoslovakia to help rescue more children by sending them to Britain. Thousands were on a list for possible rescue, but he could only save hundreds. In Britain, Nicholas Winton worked to get visas for children to be granted entry. Working with the British Committee for Refugees from Czechoslovakia headed by Doreen Warriner, Chadwick had the task of selecting children for the kindertransport and organizing their departure. His first operation, 14 March 1939, was a 20-seat airplane evacuation from Prague which he accompanied. Later, the evacuation of children was by train. Chadwick accompanied the children to the Prague Railroad Station, from where the children, with adult escorts, notably Quaker Tessa Rowntree and Unitarian Martha Sharp, journeyed by rail through Poland or Nazi Germany to seaports on the Baltic Sea or in the Netherlands from where they sailed to Britain.

On 15 March 1939, the situation in Czechoslovakia became more dangerous. German troops occupied the whole Czech part of the country. The German crackdown stimulated a large market in forged passports and exit documents in which Chadwick was probably involved. Warriner and many other refugee workers found it prudent to leave the country to avoid arrest. On 2 June 1939, Chadwick saw off a trainload of 123 children and left Czechoslovakia shortly thereafter, possibly fearing arrest by the German Gestapo for forging documents. With his departure, Beatrice Wellington became the sole representative of the British Committee in Czechoslovakia. The evacuation of children continued. All together, until it was shut down with the declaration of war on 1 September 1939, the kindertransports escorted 669 children out of Czechoslovakia.

Winton, who was honoured many years later for his participation in the kindertransport, acknowledged the vital roles in Prague of Chadwick, along with Doreen Warriner, diplomat Robert J. Stopford, Beatrice Wellington, Josephine Pike, and Bill Barazetti. Of Chadwick, Winton later wrote, "Chadwick did the more difficult and dangerous work after the Nazis invaded… he deserves all praise".

== Later life ==
Chadwick's life took a downward trajectory after his return from Czechoslovakia. He joined first the Royal Naval Reserve and later the Royal Air Force but after several incidents, probably caused by his excessive drinking, was sent back to Britain from North Africa in 1942. He divorced his first wife and married again briefly. He worked at many jobs but was diagnosed with tuberculosis and sent by his family to a sanatorium in Oslo, Norway. He married for a third time there and achieved some happiness and stability, but suffered a stroke and died on 23 December 1979. At the time of his death the work of the Czechoslovak refugee workers was largely forgotten, but the public recognition of Nicholas Winton, beginning in 1988, brought some recognition to other members of the group.

== Legacy ==
Chadwick has been commemorated in his hometown of Swanage, Dorset, with a children's playground named after him in the Recreation Ground. A bronze sculpture of Chadwick with two children by local sculptor Moira Purver has been installed in the recreation ground; the statue was erected on 29 August 2022. Swanage Town Council approved in 2020 the installation of a blue plaque commemorating Chadwick at Swanage railway station.

Chadwick's son was the British novelist Charles Chadwick (1932–2025).

Chadwick was a recipient of the British Hero of the Holocaust award in January 2018 for saving Jewish lives.

Alex Sharp played Chadwick in the 2023 film One Life.
