= Mary Sheepshanks =

British pacifist and feminist

Mary Ryott Sheepshanks (25 October 1872 – 21 January 1960) was a pacifist, feminist, journalist and social worker. She is not to be confused with the author of the same name born in 1931.

== Childhood and education ==
Sheepshanks was born on 25 October 1872 in Liverpool, England. Her father was John Sheepshanks, an Anglican bishop, her mother was Margaret Ryott. The couple had thirteen children who survived infancy, of which Mary was the eldest daughter. Sheepshanks' mother did not have much time for her because of her many children, and Mary's relationship with her father was bad as well. Sheepshanks attended the Liverpool High School for Girls and lived in Kassel to learn German when she was seventeen. In 1891, Sheepshanks enrolled at Newnham College, Cambridge to study medieval and modern languages.

== Career ==
=== Social work ===
During her university years, Sheepshanks started teaching literacy classes to adults in Barnwell, Cambridgeshire. Sheepshanks met Bertrand Russell during this time, whose progressive ideas influenced her to the extent that her father didn't want her to come home during holidays. Sheepshanks had also, at some point, become an atheist. In 1895, Sheepshanks joined the Women's University Settlement in Southwark, where young adults with a university degree would help impoverished people. In 1897, she became vice-president of Morley College for Working Men and Women, where Sheepshanks asked, among others, Virginia Woolf to give lectures.

=== Women's suffrage ===
Sheepshanks had also invited Christabel Pankhurst to give a lecture at Morley College in 1907, where she spoke at a debate on women's suffrage. Sheepshanks' closing remarks to the debate were that women should be granted the vote because it would be good for them and for the state. Sheepshanks was a more moderate suffragist opposed to the suffragettes violent actions, but she did appreciate the suffragettes' courage. Sheepshanks joined the National Union of Women's Suffrage Societies and, in 1913, went on a European tour to talk about suffrage and other subjects that concerned women. That same year, she visited the International Congress of Women in Budapest, as part of the British delegation along with Agnes Harben, one of the founders of the United Suffragists. Sheepshanks was appointed secretary of the International Alliance of Women and editor of its magazine, Jus Suffragii. Sheepshanks was encouraged to take on these functions by another British delegate, Jane Addams.

=== Pacifism and Jus Suffragii ===
Mary Sheepshanks was a pacifist and opposed World War I. Sheepshanks advocated her point of view in Jus Suffragii and called for disarmament. In November 1914, she wrote:

"Armaments must be drastically reduced and abolished, and their place taken by an international police force. Instead of two great Alliances pitted against each other, we must have a true Concert of Europe. Peace must be on generous, unvindictive lines, satisfying legitimate national needs, and leaving no cause for resentment such as to lead to another war. Only so can it be permanent."

Sheepshanks wanted the magazine to remain neutral in its rapports of voting rights, so she asked women in non-belligerent states to send her news about women in the Central Powers. Sheepshanks also advocated for Britain to take in Belgian refugees and the International Women's Relief Committee was housed in the Jus offices. Many suffragists did not agree with Sheepshanks' neutral approach and she received many verbal attacks from both them and the press for giving attention to 'enemy states'. This lead Sheepshanks to open a file for 'anonymous abuse'. There were also people who defended Sheepshanks' neutrality, and after the war she received various letters thanking her for keeping the women's movement united.

=== After the war ===
In 1918, Sheepshanks was appointed secretary of the Fight the Famine Council, an organisation that occupied itself with the need for a new economical order in Europe. In 1920, she lobbied the League of Nations to admit Germany and revise the reparations demanded by the Treaty of Versailles. Sheepshanks became international secretary of the Women's International League for Peace and Freedom and resigned her position in 1931 because she disagreed with the position of other members of the board. Sheepshanks kept on organising conferences, campaigning for peace and helping victims of war. Between 1939 and 1940, Sheepshanks welcomed her old friend, the Czech Jewish social worker Marie Schmolka, who stayed with her in Gospel Oak. The Second World War had made Sheepshanks pessimistic, writing to her niece:

"[...] I admit that this war has made me deeply pessimistic, the incredible savagery and beastliness of the Germans and the immeasurable suffering they caused make me despair of human nature [...]"

Sheepshanks was opposed to blanket bombings and feared the consequences of nuclear weapons.

During her later years, Sheepshanks suffered from various health issues, including arthritis. In 1955, Sheepshanks wrote her memoirs. Because of her increasingly bad health and her carer help resigning, Sheepshanks decided to commit suicide rather than being placed in a care home.

Mary Sheepshanks died in her house in Hampstead on 21 January 1960, aged 87.
