= Doreen Warriner =

English humanitarian and development economist

Doreen Warriner OBE
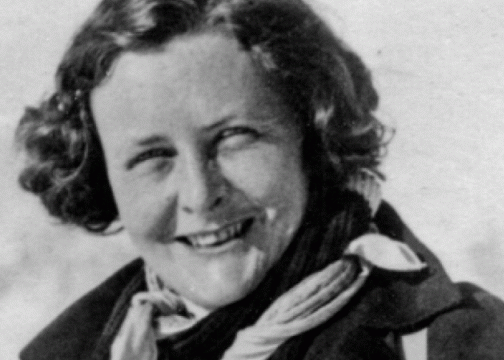
- Doreen Warriner (1940s)
- Born: Doreen Agnes Rosemary Julia Warriner; 16 March 1904; Long Compton, Warwickshire
- Died: 17 December 1972 (aged 68)
- Occupations: Economist, scholar
- Known for: Rescuing anti-Nazi Czech refugees

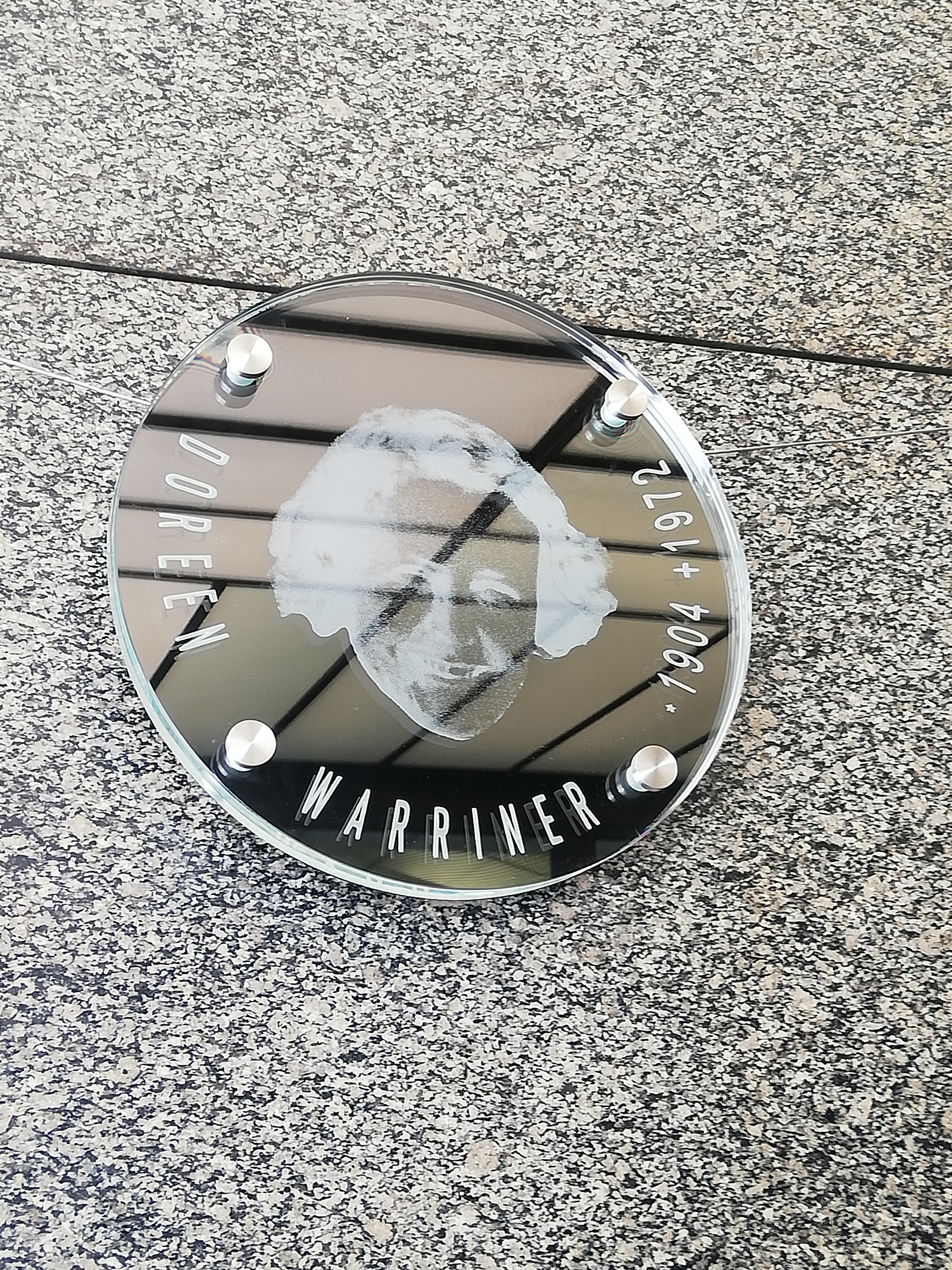
Memorial plaque to Warriner in Prague (unveiled in April 2019)

Doreen Agnes Rosemary Julia Warriner OBE (16 March 1904 – 17 December 1972) was an English development economist and humanitarian. In October 1938, she journeyed to Czechoslovakia to assist anti-Nazi refugees fleeing the Sudetenland, recently occupied by Germany. She became the head of the British Committee for Refugees from Czechoslovakia in Prague which helped 15,000 German, Czech, and Jewish refugees escape Czechoslovakia while the country was being occupied and annexed by Nazi Germany in 1938 and 1939. Told that she would be arrested by the Germans Warriner departed Czechoslovakia on 23 April 1939. She was appointed an Officer of the Most Excellent Order of the British Empire (OBE) in 1941. After the War, she returned to academia and taught at the School of Slavonic and East European Studies.

She was a posthumous recipient of the British Hero of the Holocaust award.

== Early life ==
Warriner was born in Long Compton, Warwickshire, England. Her parents were Henry Arthur Warriner (1859–1927), a land agent for Weston Park, Long Compton, and his wife Henrietta Beatrice (1876–1953), daughter of Thomas McNulty, a Church of England clergyman of a slum parish in the Staffordshire Black Country, who had left Ireland. Her younger brother was the Olympic sportsman Michael Warriner.

Warriner was educated at Malvern Girls' College, then at St Hugh's College, Oxford, where she obtained a first in PPE. While holding a research studentship at the London School of Economics and then the Mary Somerville Research Fellowship at Somerville College, Oxford she researched combines and rationalisation in Germany for which she was awarded a doctorate from London in 1931. In 1933 she became assistant lecturer in political economy at University College London. Although German industry was the subject of her doctoral research, most of her published work was about small-scale peasant farming and land reform in central and Eastern Europe. Warriner was described as a "staunch feminist and internationalist with an interest in communism." She was investigated by the British security agency, MI5, between 1938 and 1952 for her suspected communist contacts, but apparently no adverse information was recorded.

== Rescuing Czech refugees ==
In the Munich Agreement of 30 September 1938 Czechoslovakia ceded the Sudetenland region of the country to Nazi Germany. Fearing Nazi oppression, anti-Nazi socialists, communists, and social democrats fled the Sudetenland for the still-independent parts of Czechoslovakia along with anti-Nazis from Germany itself. The anti-Jewish pogrom of Kristallnacht in Germany on 9–10 November 1938 stimulated many Jews to flee Germany and Czechoslovakia was one destination. In late 1938 there were about 200,000 German, Sudeten, and Jewish refugees in Czechoslovakia.

Warriner arrived in Prague by air on 13 October 1938 with £450 donated to her to assist the refugees. She found a chaotic situation in Prague and an anticipation that the Nazis would take over the whole country. She made contact with the Society of Friends and a number of other humanitarian organisations, but quickly realised that her first priority was not relief, but getting people vulnerable to Nazi oppression out of Czechoslovakia. Together with Welsh politician David Grenfell and Sudetenland leader Siegfried Taub, she made a list of the 250 most vulnerable refugees from Sudetenland, all men, in Czechoslovakia and Grenfell returned to England to attempt to gain permission for them to take refuge in Britain. Grenfell quickly obtained permission for the refugees to be admitted into Britain, but with no provision for taking their families with them. Warriner supervised the departure of the men from Czechoslovakia by train to Poland from where they continued onward to Britain. Warriner's main focus was on rescuing anti-Nazi political refugees for resettlement.

In November, Warriner turned some of her attention to the squalid refugee camps scattered in the countryside around Prague. In late November, journalist Walter Layton visited Czechoslovakia and appointed her as the representative of the British Committee for Refugees from Czechoslovakia (BCRC) with a budget of £7,000 and a staff consisting of a small band of women. On 12 December, the Daily Telegraph published a letter by her which criticised British relief efforts and the ineffectual response of British people to the Czech crisis. She was reprimanded for the letter by a BCRC official who estimated that the letter cost the BCRC £10,000 in potential donations. In January 1939, the governments of France and the United Kingdom acknowledged the refugee crisis by pledging £12,000,000 for the cost of resettling Czech refugees. Canada agreed to finance and resettle 1,000 Sudetens.

Warriner, several key colleagues, and a large number of foreign and Czech humanitarian organisations were then in a race to get as many Czech refugees as possible out of the country before the anticipated German takeover. British authorisations of visas for Czechs only trickled in, however, and she flew to Britain in late January and got permission to evacuate immediately 600 families and to speed up the bureaucratic procedures for Czech refugees to go to Britain. On 15 March, German troops marched into Czechoslovakia and occupied the whole country. By the end of March, German authorities began refusing exit visas for Czechs, especially communists, although not hindering the departure of Jewish children. The German crackdown stimulated a large market in forged passports and exit documents in which Warriner was probably involved. Warriner's close associate at the UK Legation in Prague, diplomat Robert J. Stopford, continued to seek legal authorisation from the Germans for refugees to leave Czechoslovakia while Warriner and her associates smuggled out refugees with forged documents mostly by train through Poland, while hiding hundreds of threatened people, mostly women, in shabby hotels.

On 14 April, the German Gestapo raided Warriner's office. She was not there but a Canadian Quaker worker, Beatrice Wellington, was detained and questioned. Stopford told Warriner that the Germans planned to arrest her and advised her to leave Czechoslovakia immediately and on 23 April Warriner departed. Wellington was appointed to replace her as the representative of the BCRC in Prague. Stopford estimated that Warriner and her colleagues in the BCRC, including those who remained in the country after her departure, facilitated the departure of 15,000 refugees from Czechoslovakia in 1938 and 1939, most of whom were resettled in Britain.

== Later life ==
During World War II, Warriner worked for the Minister of Economic Warfare in Britain and Egypt and in 1944–1946 headed the food-supply division of the United Nations Relief and Rehabilitation Administration's Yugoslavian mission. She returned to academic life in 1947–1966 at the University of London's School of Slavonic and East European Studies; she was made a reader in 1960 and a professor in 1964. She wrote favourably of the communist revolutions in Eastern Europe after the war. Land reform was a major focus of her academic work but by 1969 she had changed her views to endorse the need for individual land ownership and credit and criticised communism for ignoring economics in favour of getting "peasants under control."

Doreen Warriner died on 17 December 1972 after suffering a stroke. The memoir of her work in Czechoslovakia, Winter in Prague, was published posthumously in 1984.

== Recognition ==
Warriner was appointed an Officer of the Most Excellent Order of the British Empire (OBE) in the 1941 New Year Honours "for services in 1938 and 1939 in connection with refugees leaving Czechoslovakia".

She was a recipient of the British Hero of the Holocaust award for saving Jewish lives in January 2018.

Warriner figures prominently in the 2023 biopic of Nicholas Winton, One Life. She is played by Romola Garai.

== Selected publications ==
- Combines and Rationalisation in Germany, 1924-1928 (1931)
- Economic Problems of Peasant Farming (1939)
- Food and Farming in Postwar Europe (1943)
- Land and Poverty in the Middle East (1948)
- First report on progress in land reform compiled for the United Nations (1954)
- Land Reform in Principle and Practice (1969)
- Winter in Prague (1984)

== See also ==
- Trevor Chadwick
- Gerda Mayer
- Tessa Rowntree
- Marie Schmolka
- Kindertransport
- Hansi Neumann flight

Non-profit organization positions
Preceded by New position	Secretary of the Fabian Society International Bureau; 1940–1942	Succeeded by Mildred Bamford
