= Charles Chadwick (novelist) =

English novelist (1932–2025)

Charles McKenzie Chadwick CBE (31 July 1932 – 16 June 2025) was an English novelist.

Chadwick's father was Trevor Chadwick. Chadwick was born in Swanage. He worked as a civil servant from the early 1970s. He held a position as a British Council officer in Nigeria in 1972 and worked in Kenya, Brazil, Canada, and Poland, where he was the Council's Director.

Chadwick retired from the civil service in 1992. He wrote several novels, all of which were originally rejected by publishers.

In 2004, Chadwick was offered a major Faber and Faber publishing deal for his novel It's All Right Now, which was written over a period of thirty years. In its initial edition, the book was 679 pages and covered the life of an ordinary middle-aged English man from his thirties into his sixties (tagline: "A written life, an unwritten life", as quoted from last page). The book was published in May 2005 by Faber & Faber in the UK and HarperCollins in the U.S.

Chadwick was appointed Officer of the Order of the British Empire (OBE) in the 1984 Birthday Honours, and Commander of the Order of the British Empire (CBE) in the 1992 New Year Honours, for services to the British Council whilst he was a British Council officer.

Chadwick died on 16 June 2025 aged 92; his death being announced on 2 July.
