= Michael Rowntree =

British journalist and social campaigner

Michael Hotham Rowntree (16 February 1919 – 23 September 2007) was a British journalist and social campaigner. He was involved with Oxfam for 60 years, serving as chairman between 1971 and 1977 and Chair Emeritus from 1991.

== Early life ==
Rowntree was the son of Arnold Rowntree and a nephew of the chocolatier and social-reformer Joseph Rowntree. He was educated at Earnseat School in Arnside, and then at Bootham School. York, where he became head boy. He won a scholarship to Queen's College, Oxford where he read PPE for two years until the Second World War intervened.

A conscientious objector, he helped Paul Cadbury and Michael Barratt Brown to re-establish the Friends Ambulance Unit ("FAU") holding many leadership positions. He worked in Finland in 1940, then in Cairo, and became his FAU unit's leader in North Africa and then into Italy. Later he co-ordinated the work of all FAU units in Germany. Rowntree's older sister, Tessa, helped refugees from Nazi Germany leave Czechoslovakia for Britain before World War II began.

At the end of the war, he married Anna Crosfield, a textiles' artist. They went on to have three children.

== Professional life ==
Rowntree's first post-war job was as a journalist at the Northern Echo in Darlington. He moved to Oxford in 1950 to become assistant general manager at the Oxford Mail and the Oxford Times where he was promoted one year later to general manager. During his tenure he increased circulation and guided the newspapers through one of their most challenging and successful periods. He resigned in 1967 to concentrate on his other responsibilities, although he remained a director. He also served as director of the Friends Provident and Century Life insurance company from 1956 to 1973, and of the Friends Provident Life Office from 1973 to 1975.

Rowntree was involved in many other organisations, including chairing for a time the Joseph Rowntree Reform Trust, and the Joseph Rowntree Charitable Trust. He was vice chair of the Oxford Area Health Authority, and a trustee of the Quaker magazine, The Friend.

== Oxfam ==
Rowntree worked with Oxfam for 60 years, beginning in 1947. He became a committee member in 1951, a trustee in 1952, and was chairman from 1971 to 1977. He became Chair Emeritus in 1991, one of only two honoured with that position.

== Personal life ==
He enjoyed walking in the North York Moors, and was a keen birdwatcher. He retired to Yorkshire in 1981. He was survived by his wife, two daughters and a son.
