= One Life (2023 film) =

British biographical film directed by James Hawes

- UK theatrical release poster
- Directed by: James Hawes
- Screenplay by: Lucinda Coxon; Nick Drake
- Based on: If It's Not Impossible…The Life of Sir Nicholas Winton by Barbara Winton
- Produced by: Joanna Laurie; Iain Canning; Emile Sherman; Guy Heeley
- Starring: Anthony Hopkins; Helena Bonham Carter; Johnny Flynn; Lena Olin; Romola Garai; Alex Sharp; Jonathan Pryce
- Cinematography: Zac Nicholson
- Edited by: Lucia Zucchetti
- Music by: Volker Bertelmann
- Production companies: BBC Film; MBK Productions; See-Saw Films; Cross City Films; FilmNation Entertainment; LipSync
- Distributed by: Warner Bros. Pictures (United Kingdom); Vertical Entertainment (Czech Republic); Transmission Films (Australia); Bleecker Street (United States)
- Release dates: 9 September 2023 (TIFF); 1 January 2024 (United Kingdom); 1 February 2024 (Czech Republic); 15 March 2024 (United States)
- Running time: 110 minutes
- Countries: United Kingdom; Czech Republic; Australia; United States
- Language: English
- Box office: $56.4 million

One Life is a 2023 biographical drama film directed by James Hawes. Based on the true story of British humanitarian Nicholas Winton, the film alternates between following Anthony Hopkins as a 79-year old Winton reminiscing on his past, and Johnny Flynn as a 29-year old Winton who successfully helps 669 predominantly Jewish children in German-occupied Czechoslovakia to hide and flee in 1938–39, just before the beginning of World War II. Helena Bonham Carter, Lena Olin, Romola Garai, Alex Sharp and Jonathan Pryce co-star in supporting roles.

One Life had its world première at the Toronto International Film Festival on 9 September 2023, and its European première at the 2023 London Film Festival. It was released in the United Kingdom on 1 January 2024 by Warner Bros. Pictures, and later in the United States on 15 March 2024 by Bleecker Street. The film received mostly positive reviews, with praise for the performances of the cast, particularly Hopkins and Bonham Carter.

== Plot ==
When 29-year-old London stockbroker Nicholas Winton visits Czechoslovakia in 1938, just weeks after the Munich Agreement was signed, he encounters families in Prague who had fled the rise of the Nazis in Germany and Austria. They are living in poor conditions, with little or no shelter or food and in fear of the invasion of the Nazis. Winton is introduced to Doreen Warriner, head of the Prague office of the British Committee for Refugees from Czechoslovakia (BCRC).

Horrified by the conditions in the refugee camps, Winton decides to save as many of the children as he can. Actively supported by his mother Babette, herself a German-Jewish migrant who has since converted to the Church of England, he overcomes bureaucratic hurdles, collects donations and looks for foster families for the children brought to England. Many of them are Jews who are at imminent risk of deportation. A race against time begins as it is unclear how long the borders will remain open before a probable Nazi invasion.

Fifty years later, in 1988, Winton, now 79 years old, cleans up some of the clutter in his office, which his wife Grete asked him to do. He finds his old documents in which he recorded his work for the BCRC, with photos and lists of both the children they wanted to bring to safety and those they successfully saved. Winton still blames himself for not being able to rescue more.

At lunch with his old friend Martin, Winton thinks about what he should do with his main scrapbook, full of documents. He is considering donating them to a Holocaust museum, but at the same time he wants to draw some attention to the current plight of refugees as he continues working for the underprivileged, so he decides against it.

The documents end up in the hands of the That's Life! production team, a TV show produced by the BBC with presenter Esther Rantzen. Winton is invited onto the show and asked to sit in the audience. That's Life surprises Winton when the woman sitting beside him is revealed to be one of the children he helped save.

Reaction to the show causes them to invite Winton back the following week. Again, Rantzen reveals that a woman and a man, sitting on either side of Winton and Grete, are two others of the rescued children, then reveals that the entire studio audience, directly owe their lives to his humanitarian effort.

Closing narration reveals that, after the broadcast, hundreds more of the rescued contacted Winton, and that he kept in touch with them – and their children and grandchildren – for the next 27 years, until his death at 106-years-old. It is also stated that, as of the 2023 release of the film, over 6,000 people were alive thanks to Winton, with the entire audience of the film's 1988 That's Life! recreation drawn from that group.

== Cast ==
- Anthony Hopkins and Johnny Flynn as Nicholas Winton, a British stockbroker and the son of two German-born parents who takes on an important role in the Kindertransport, an organised effort to rescue children from Nazi-occupied territory, in the lead-up to World War II. Hopkins portrays Winton as a 79-year old reminiscing on his past, while Flynn portrays him as a 29-year old on the eve of the war.
- Helena Bonham Carter as Babi Winton, Nicholas's British, German-born mother who actively assists in his humanitarian efforts.
- Lena Olin as Grete Winton, Nicholas' wife
- Jonathan Pryce as Martin Blake, another Kindertransport humanitarian who remains friends with an elderly Winton. The film marks the third time Hopkins and Pryce worked together, after a one-night theatre performance of Under Milk Wood in 1992 and the 2019 film The Two Popes.
  - Ziggy Heath portrays a young Martin Blake
- Romola Garai as Doreen Warriner, an English Kindertransport humanitarian helping on-site in Czechoslovakia
- Alex Sharp as Trevor Chadwick, a British Kindertransport humanitarian who accompanied some of the children during their escapes by train
- Samantha Spiro as Esther Rantzen, the British presenter of the BBC TV show That's Life!, which runs a story on Winton
- Juliana Moska as Hana Hejdukova
- Ella Novakova as Lenka
- Samuel Finzi as Rabbi Hertz
- Henrietta Garden as Vera Gissing
  - Frantiska Polakova as young Vera Diamontova
- Alzbeta Cerna as Eva Diamontova
- Jolana Jirotkova as gap-toothed girl
- Anna Darvas as Lady Milena Grenfell-Baines
- Marthe Keller as Elisabeth Maxwell
- Michael Gould as Leadbetter
- Adrian Rawlins as Geoff
- Antonie Formanová as Marta
- Tom Glenister as William Hughes, Baron Hughes

== Production ==
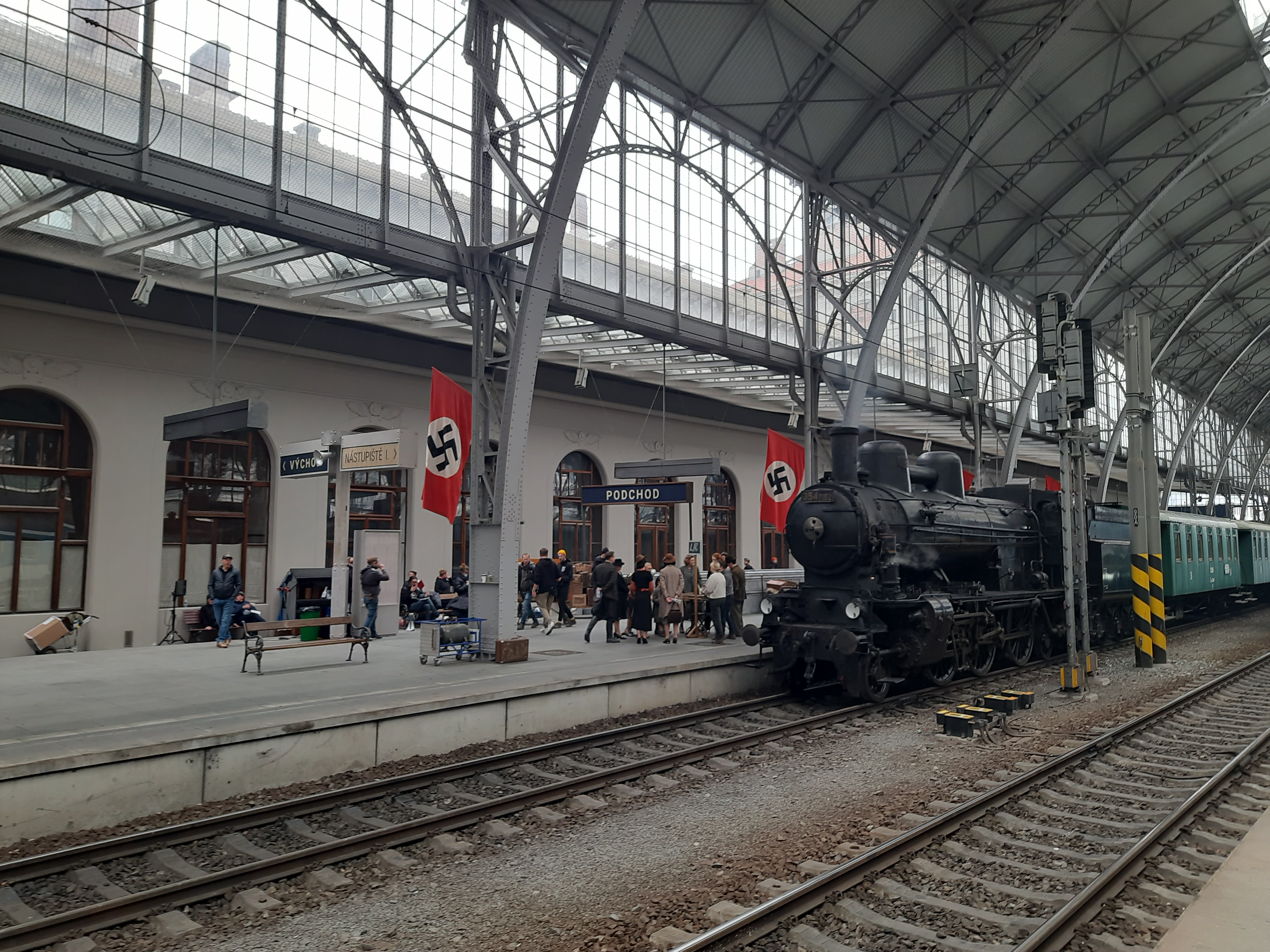
The film set of One Life at Prague Main Railway Station

In September 2020 Anthony Hopkins and Johnny Flynn were announced as being attached to a biopic about Sir Nicholas Winton called ‘’One Life’’. From a Lucinda Coxon and Nick Drake screenplay, Aisling Walsh was set to direct with See-Saw Films and BBC Film producing through executive producers Rose Garnett and Simon Gillis, and producers Iain Canning, Emile Sherman, and Joanna Laurie. FilmNation Entertainment and Cross City Films were to be managing international sales.

In September 2022 it was revealed that James Hawes was attached to direct his feature film debut while Helena Bonham Carter had joined the cast as Winton’s mother, Babi Winton. It was also revealed that Guy Heeley was on board as producer and that the screenplay was based on the book If It’s Not Impossible…The Life of Sir Nicholas Winton, written by his daughter Barbara Winton. Also announced as joining the cast were Jonathan Pryce, Romola Garai and Alex Sharp. Filming took place in London in September 2022, with principal photography also taking place in Prague.

Winton’s daughter requested that Hopkins should play her father. Hopkins read the script and accepted the part. Winton’s son praised Hopkins’s portrayal of his father. One survivor called the film a “fitting tribute”. The extras making up the recreation of the show's audience are the actual children of those Winton had saved.

Helena Bonham Carter bore a personal connection to the subject material, as her own maternal grandfather, Spanish diplomat Eduardo Propper de Callejón, saved thousands of Jews from the Holocaust during the Second World War, for which he was recognised as Righteous Among the Nations.

== Reception ==
=== Critical response ===
On the review aggregator website Rotten Tomatoes, 91% of 149 critics' reviews are positive, with an average rating of 7.3/10. The website's consensus reads: "Held aloft by outstanding work from a tremendous cast, One Life pays heartwarming tribute to a remarkable humanitarian effort." Metacritic, which uses a weighted average, assigned the film a score of 69 out of 100, based on 30 critics, indicating "generally favorable" reviews.

Ian Freer in Time Out described it as a "remarkable World War II story told conventionally but elevated by a superb Anthony Hopkins". In The Guardian, Peter Bradshaw wrote "You'd need a heart of stone not to be touched by this extraordinary true story". Reviewing the film for The Observer, Wendy Ide gave the film three out of five. Robbie Collin of The Daily Telegraph gave the film four out of five. The Spectator's Deborah Ross praised the themes, performances and the film's message. Clarisse Loughrey of The Independent offered a more mixed review, though praised Hopkins's performance. Writing for The Guardian, Matthew Reisz, whose father was one of the children Winton had saved, felt the film betrayed Winton. Nicola Gissing, another descendant of a saved child, wrote a letter to the paper in response, defending the film.

=== Controversy ===
Despite rescuing predominantly Jewish children, on the BBC Film website this fact was omitted. Cinema operators in the UK therefore mentioned in their advertising for One Life that Nicholas Winton had saved "children from Central Europe". Following protests, BBC Film changed the film's description, writing instead that Winton had saved "predominantly Jewish" children.

=== Accolades ===
One Life won Cinema for Peace Dove for The Most Valuable Film of the Year 2024 in Berlin.
