= Marie Schmolka =

Czech-Jewish humanitarian (1893–1940)

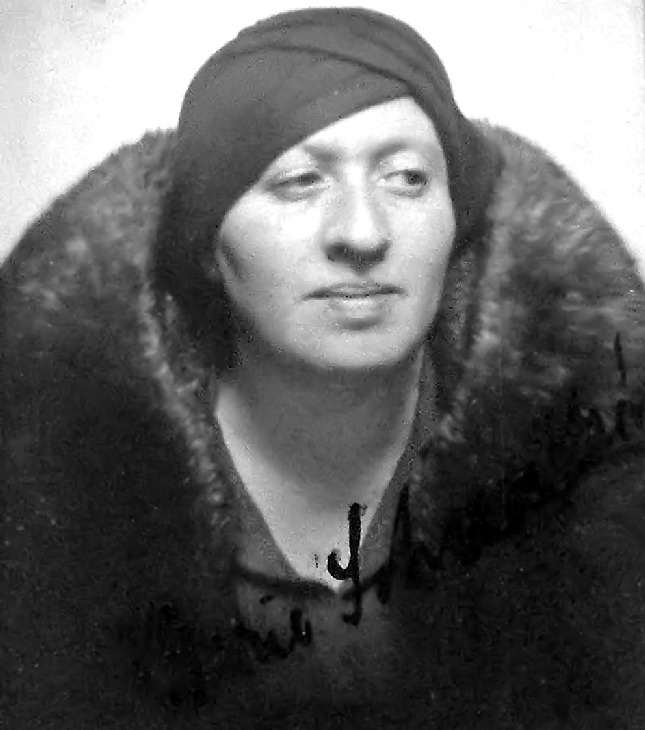
- Marie Schmolka in the 1930s
- Born: 23 June 1893; Prague, Austria-Hungary
- Died: 27 March 1940 (aged 46)
- Occupation: Social worker
- Known for: Helping Jewish and political refugees escape the Nazis from Protectorate of Bohemia and Moravia and Germany
- Notable work: O sociální práci

Marie Schmolka (née Eisner; 23 June 1893 – 27 March 1940) was a Czechoslovak Jewish activist and social worker who helped political refugees and Jewish adults and children escape the Protectorate of Bohemia and Moravia in the lead-up to World War II. She was a member of WIZO and WILPF. She had previously helped refugees from Germany who fled to Czechoslovakia after the Nazi rise to power. Schmolka headed the newly founded Czechoslovak Refugee Committee, and also chaired local HICEM. In July 1938, she represented Czechoslovakia at the Évian conference.

Together with Doreen Warriner from the British Committee for Refugees from Czechoslovakia and Martin Blake, she invited Nicholas Winton to Prague, where Winton helped with their Kindertransport scheme. In August 1939, she was sent by Adolf Eichmann to negotiate Jewish emigration from Central Europe to Paris on a JOINT conference. Caught up by the outbreak of the Second World War, she relocated to London and continued her work for refugees as part of Bloomsbury House. She moved in with her old friend, suffragist and pacifist Mary Sheepshanks in Gospel Oak, Lissenden Gardens. She died on 27 March 1940 following a heart attack. Her funeral in Golders Green Jewish Cemetery was attended by Jan Masaryk, Rebecca Sieff, Hana Benešová (wife of the Czechoslovak president), Wenzel Jaksch, as well as many leading personalities of British Jewry and Czechoslovak emigration.

== Marie Schmolka historical marker ==
A historical marker, donated by the Jewish American Society for Historic Preservation, was placed on the Holocaust Rescuer's Wall outside the Golders Green Jewish Cemetery in Barnet, England.

The text reads:

"Marie Schmolka was the only Czechoslovak representative at the Evian conference of July 1938, which focused on the Jewish refugee crisis. After the Munich agreement of September 1938, together with Doreen Warriner, she organised the Kindertransporte scheme that brought in Sir Nicholas Winton.

Schmolka was arrested by the Gestapo and gruelingly interrogated, her life at extreme risk. The Nazis exiled her to Paris, conditional upon her removing as many Jews as possible from Czechoslovakia. With the fall of France, she escaped to London, where she lived with the noted British Pacifist and Humanitarian, Mary Sheepshanks, in Gospel Oak, London. By now, her health had been broken by her extreme efforts to save Jews and others from the Nazis. She died, age 47.

Marie Schmolka saved thousands upon thousands of lives."

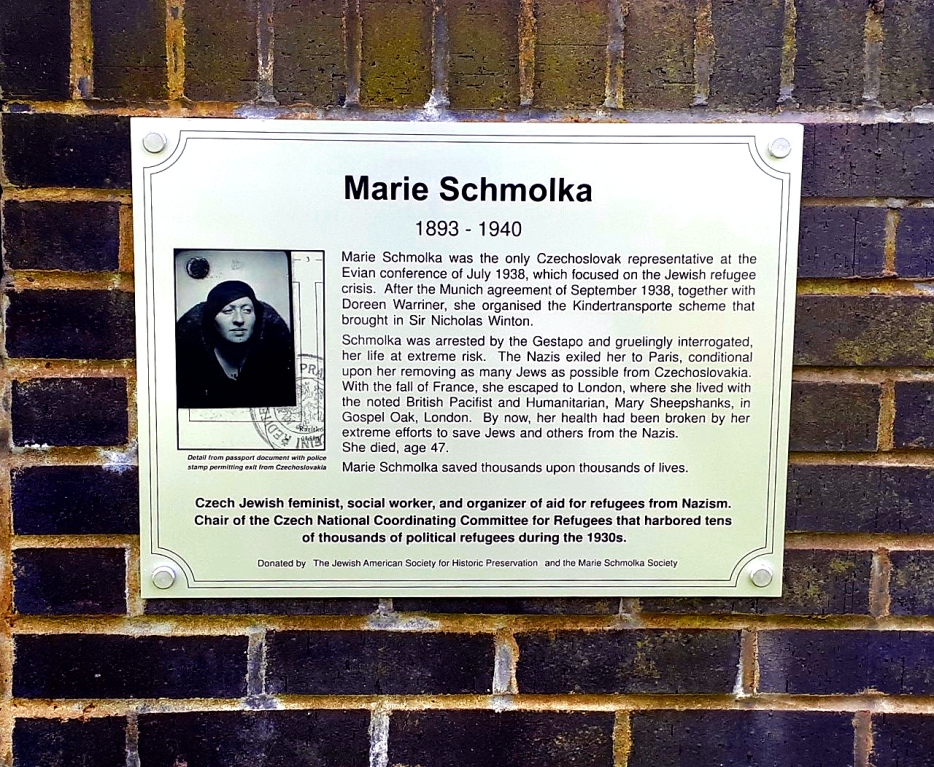
Marie Schmolka historical marker on the Holocaust Rescuers wall, Hoop Lane, Barnet, England
