= L. Behrens & Söhne =

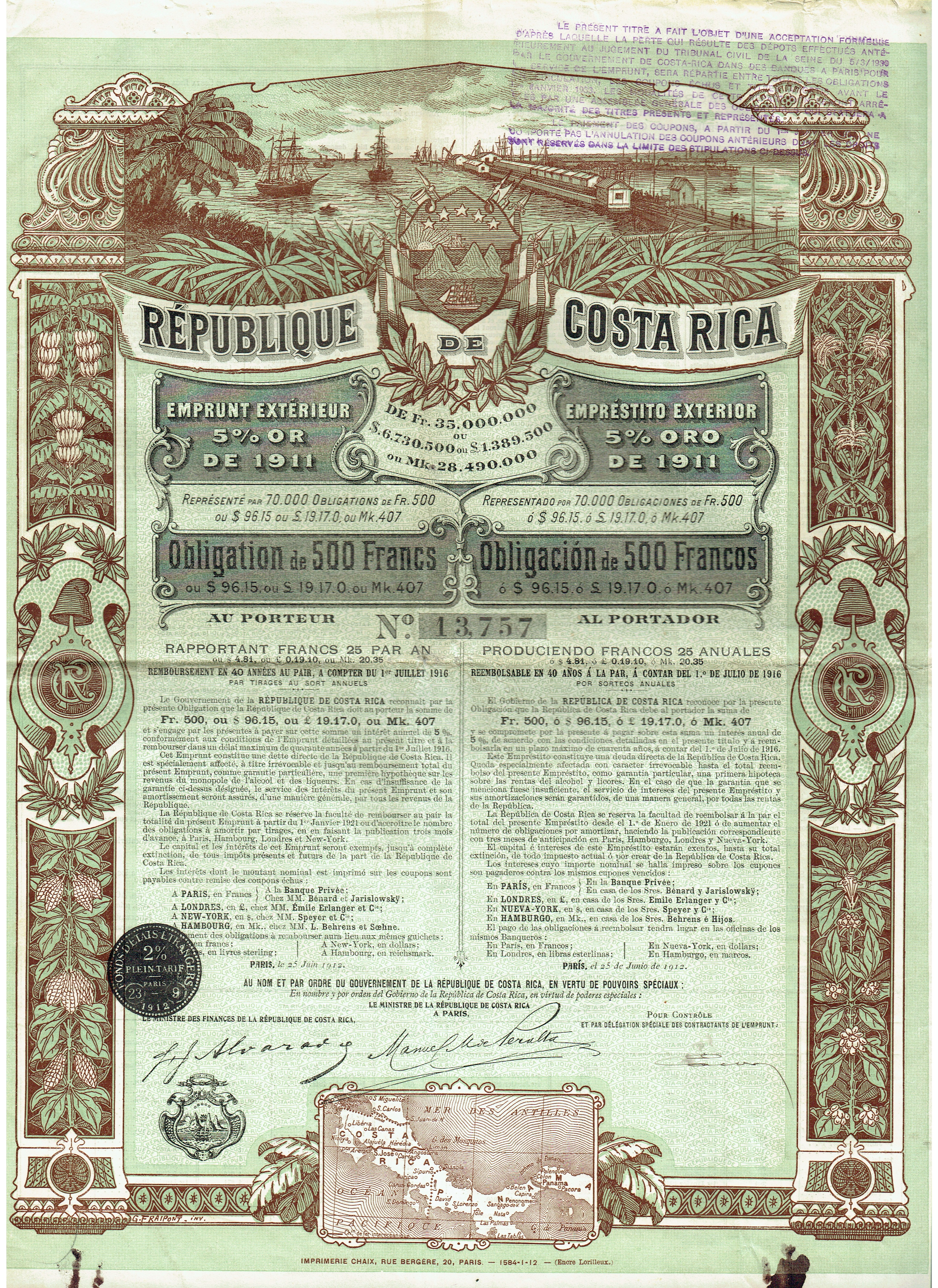

L. Behrens & Söhne was a Hamburg private bank and trading company (1806 to 1970).

== History ==
The merchant Levy Behrens, who had immigrated from Pyrmont, founded the company L. Behrens & Söhne with his sons in Hamburg in 1806. Successful merchant bankers, they traded primarily in English and Saxon textiles and drapery, which they sold in northern Germany. The two sons founded subsidiaries in English: Salomon Levy Behrens in 1815 in Manchester the S. L. Behrens & Co. and Jakob Behrens in 1834 in Leeds the still existing Jacob Behrens & Co..

They began working with the London banking house Rothschild, L. Behrens & Söhne, the Frankfurt banking house Rothschild and the Berlin banking house S. Bleichröder. L. Behrens & Söhne rose to become one of the leading Hamburg banking houses, alongside Joh. Berenberg, Gossler & Co, Conrad Hinrich Donner and M. M. Warburg & Co.

After the First World War, L. Behrens & Söhne entered the sugar trade and was one of the first German companies to export German sugar.

== Nazi era ==
When the Nazis came to power in 1933, Jews were persecuted and their companies transferred to non-Jews in a process the Nazis called Aryanization. The bank was "Aryanized" in 1938. The main owner George Eduard Behrens was de facto expropriated. George E. Behrens was arrested after the Kristallnacht in 1938, and imprisoned in Sachsenhausen concentration camp until March 1939. L. Behrens & Söhne was forced to cease operating on May 31, 1938, and went into liquidation on December 31, 1938. The part of the company that handled the banking business was taken over by Norddeutsche Kreditbank in Bremen. The trading department was continued by Henry S. Willink, as Willink & Co.

In 1948 G. E. Behrens returned from exile and L. Behrens & Söhne was re-established from Willink & Co. The banking business was not resumed. Nor was it possible to regain the company's former importance. In 1970, L. Behrens & Söhne was liquidated.

== Restitution ==
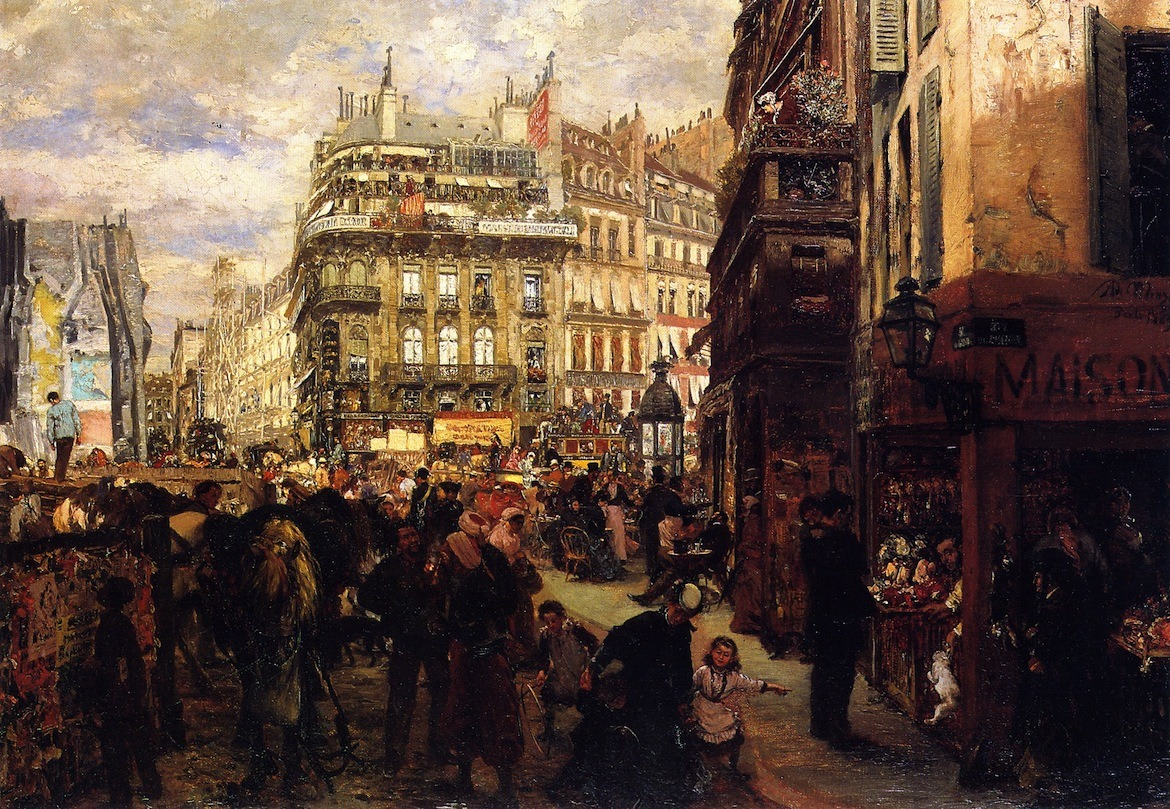
Adolf Friedrich Erdmann von Menzel – Pariser Wochentag

George Eduard Behrens collected art prior to the Nazi era. At least 57 artworks formerly in his collection are listed on the Lost Art Foundation Database. In 2008, the Dutch government restituted a work by Camille Corot to the heirs of George Behrens, which was thought to have been sold to a Dutch museum in 1940. In 2013, the Bayerische Staatsgemäldesammlungen restituted a work by de la Peña that had been sold after March 1935.

A claim for a Menzel was rejected by the city of Düsseldorf.

== See also ==
- Anglo-Deutsche Bank
- The Holocaust

== Literature ==
- Manfred Pohl: Hamburger Bankengeschichte. Mainz 1986, ISBN 3-7758-1136-2
- 175 Jahre L. Behrens & Söhne Hamburg : 1780-1955, OCLC 833134376
