= Odveig Klyve =

Norwegian writer and film director (born 1954)

Odveig Klyve (born 29 January 1954) is a Norwegian writer and film director.

Among her notable publications are Rift (poetry debut, 1993), Basunengelen (children's book, 1997), Historien om Null (children's book, 2003), Algebraisk (poetry, 2004), Det andre blikket (poetry, 2006), Sterkest. Historien om Tre (children's book, 2006) and Hemmeleg (children's book, 2007). In total she has published seven poetry collections and eight children's books. She has also translated work of the Iranian poet Forugh Farrokhzād, the Palestinian poet Fadwa Touqan and an English poet.

She has written and directed several short films, which have been invited to international festivals in France, Germany, Spain, Italy, Northern Ireland, England, Scotland, Romania, US and India. She has her education in literature, film and social studies.

She hails from Hardanger and now lives in Stavanger.
