= Tessa Rowntree =

British Quaker

Elisabeth Harvey Rowntree, always known as Tessa (1909–1999), was a British Quaker who worked in Czechoslovakia in 1938–1939 evacuating refugees who were fleeing from oppression by Nazi Germany. Rowntree is known for escorting trainloads of refugees through German controlled areas to seaports in Poland and the Netherlands where they boarded ships to sail to Britain.

== Early life ==
Tessa Rowntree was born in York, England, in 1909 in a Quaker family. She was the second child and oldest daughter of Arnold Stephenson Rowntree (1872–1951), a Liberal MP, and Mary Katharine Harvey (1876–1961). She attended The Mount School in York and graduated from the London School of Economics. Michael Rowntree, who became the chairman of Oxfam, was a younger brother.

Austria united with Nazi Germany in March and April 1938 and Rowntree began working at the Friends Centre in Vienna, Austria. During her stay there she attended a rally of Adolf Hitler. She described him as "magnetic" but with a "horrid little voice".

== Czechoslovakia ==
After a month in Vienna, Emmy Cadbury, a British Quaker, asked Rowntree to go to Prague, Czechoslovakia, to set up a Friends Centre there. She noted at this time that Prague was "calm and confident". However, on 30 September 1938, that situation changed. The Munich Agreement ceded the Sudetenland region of Czechoslovakia to Germany and anti-Nazi refugees, including Social Democrats, communists, and Jews, began to flow in large numbers to Prague from the Sudetenland, Austria, and Germany. Rowntree persuaded her cousin Jean Rowntree to join her in Prague and they worked in the centre with other Quaker women, including Mary Penman, sister of Philip Noel-Baker, a future winner of a Nobel Peace Prize.

In November 1938, 92,000 registered refugees were in Czechoslovakia. An additional 150,000, mostly Jews, were unregistered, fearing that registering might make them targets. The growing refugee crisis resulted in the creation of an umbrella organization called the British Committee for Refugees from Czechoslovakia (BCRC). The BCRC was first led by Doreen Warriner and later by Canadian Beatrice Wellington. Private funds supported the BCRC initially, but in January 1939 the British government granted four million pounds to the Czech government to support and resettle the refugees in countries which would accept them.

Rowntree's first task in Prague was to escort by rail a group of several dozen Sudeten Social Democrats from Prague to the port of Gdynia, Poland where they could board a ship to Britain. She was asked to do the job by Labour MP, David Grenfell, because, "she looks a tough girl". She set off on 2 November 1938 and succeeded, remaining in Poland to meet and send off to Britain a second group of refugees. The men were evacuated from Czechoslovakia first and their families later. On 14 December Tessa (or her cousin Jean) was at the Prague railway station to send off through Poland 150 wives and children of the men earlier evacuated. The evacuation missions, passing through German-occupied Sudetenland and Danzig plus a nervous Poland, were replete with risk and difficulty.

Records are sparse about the activities of the humanitarian organizations in Czechoslovakia. They kept few records, and destroyed those they did keep to prevent them from getting into the hands of the Germans. Rowntree continued to escort groups of refugees out of Czechoslovakia. On 15 March 1939, the same day as the Germans invaded and occupied all of Czechoslovakia, she escorted 66 refugees out of the country by train and on 24 March she escorted 72 refugees by train through Nazi Germany to a seaport in the Netherlands where they embarked for Britain. Most refugee workers left Czechoslovakia shortly after the German invasion. Rowntree was questioned and released by the Gestapo, probably in April. The date she left Czechoslovakia is unknown. On 25 July 1939 the Germans ordered all foreign refugee offices closed. World War II began on 1 September 1939.

== Later life ==
After returning to England, and during World War II, Rowntree worked with the Friends Relief Service, was a founder of a women's section of the Friends Ambulance Unit, and assisted in the resettlement of East End Londoners whose homes were destroyed by German bombs during the Blitz. She met an American, John Warder "Jack" Cadbury, who was working with the Quakers and in August 1942, they married. (The Rowntree and Cadbury families were both chocolatiers.) In 1946 they moved to New Lisbon, New Jersey in the United States. She worked as a librarian and both husband and wife were avid and wide-travelling bird watchers. Cadbury died on 13 February 1989. She died on 30 September 1999. They had one child: Alison Harvey Cadbury, born in 1949.

In 1994 Rowntree was interviewed for the Imperial War Museum.
