= Beatrice Wellington =

Canadian rescuer of children (1907–1971)

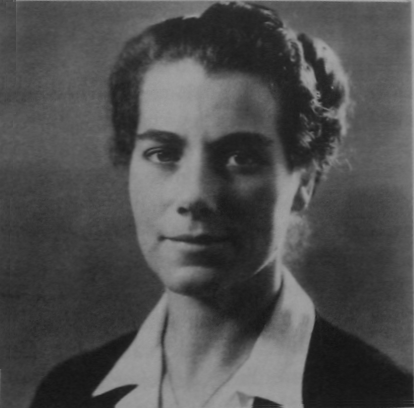
- Beatrice Wellington (before 1948)
- Born: Beatrice Gonzales; 15 June 1907; Vancouver, British Columbia, Canada
- Died: 7 April 1971 (aged 63)
- Education: University of British Columbia
- Occupation: Social activist
- Known for: Helping refugees escape from Nazi-controlled Europe

Beatrice Wellington (15 June 1907 – 7 April 1971), also known as Beatrice Gonzales, was a Canadian who worked to evacuate refugees from Czechoslovakia during the early stages of the occupation of that country by Nazi Germany in the months leading up to World War II. She headed the British Committee for Refugees from Czechoslovakia (BCRC) in Prague from April 1939 to August 1939, coordinating the efforts of many humanitarian organizations to help refugees flee Czechoslovakia. Wellington was questioned at length by the Gestapo on several occasions. She was successful in getting the German occupiers of Czechoslovakia to give exit permits to many refugees. In danger of arrest, she resisted the calls of the BCRC in London for her to depart Czechoslovakia and remained there until August 1939, leaving only a month before the beginning of World War II.

== Early life ==
Beatrice Gonzales was a Quaker who was born on 15 June 1907 in Vancouver, British Columbia, Canada. Her father abandoned the family when she was young and her stepfather, George Wellington, insisted over her objections that Beatrice adopt his last name. When she applied for her first Canadian passport to travel abroad he made sure her last name was listed as Wellington, something she resented for many years. Before she died, while teaching in Edmonton, Alberta, she changed her name back to Gonzales. Wellington enrolled at the University of British Columbia at the age of 17, and was a 1927 graduate in English and History. She took a job teaching at Point Grey Junior High School (1928–1931) and then high school in Chilliwack (1931–1936).

== Resistance against the Nazis (Czechoslovakia) ==
The accession to power of Adolf Hitler and the Nazi party in Germany in 1933 began the flight of refugees, mostly communists, Social Democrats, and Jews to Czechoslovakia. The flow of refugees increased after the Munich Agreement, which ceded to Germany the region of Czechoslovakia known as the Sudetenland; Kristalnacht, the anti-Jewish riots in Germany on 9–10 November 1938, stimulated the flight of Jewish refugees. In November 1938, the number of registered refugees in Czechoslovakia was 92,000. An additional 150,000, mostly Jews, were unregistered, fearing that registering and identification would make them targets in a country increasingly under Nazi control.

To see for herself the nature of the growing conflicts in Europe in the mid-1930s, Wellington took a year's leave of absence from teaching and went to Geneva, Switzerland, though the details of her employment remain obscure. A 1938 report from a Vancouver newspaper said that she "was appointed to take charge of a YWCA summer camp in Czechoslovakia.

Arriving in Prague during the fall of 1938, Wellington procured false documents, visas, and forged exit permits which allowed refugee and endangered Czech families to leave the country. How she accomplished this is unclear and less widely known. Compare with the efforts of Nicholas Winton, who was the last living member of the group and whose anti-Nazi activities have been the focus of several documentaries and films (e.g., One Life from 2023). Wellington was, however, also intricately connected with the Czech Refugee Institute which was involved with Jewish emigration. For example, on 25 December 1938, she told a Unitarian minister, H. J. McLachlan, that the Institute had just arranged for 149 Czech refugees to emigrate to Paraguay. On 21 January 1939, she is recorded as having attended a meeting of the British Committee on Refugees from Czechoslovakia (BCRC).

On 14 April, the Germans raided the hostel where Wellington was living and interrogated her that day and the following day for six hours, accusing her of illegal activities. The raid caused the BCRC to encourage humanitarian workers to leave Czechoslovakia but Wellington refused to leave. On 24 April, the head of BCRC, Doreen Warriner, left the country after being informed that she was on a Gestapo list to be arrested. Wellington became the leader of the BCRC, an umbrella organization that coordinated and collaborated with many humanitarian organizations in Czechoslovakia.

Wellington's task was to obtain exit documents from the German occupiers for individuals and families whose names were given to her by the Quakers, Unitarians, and other organizations dealing with the refugees. Wellington was nothing if not aggressive. Nearly every day she was in the office of Gestapo officer Karl Bömelburg requesting, and usually receiving, exit permits for 500 women and children she had identified as most vulnerable to political oppression. As she stayed in Prague after the departure of her British colleagues, she was under severe mental strain. She battled also with the BCRC in London, rejecting several attempts to recall her to Britain. She finally left Prague on 3 August 1939 and journeyed to London.

== Later life ==
On her return to Britain, Wellington worked for the Czechoslovak Refugee Trust Fund (the government-controlled successor to the BCRC), inciting both "admiration and annoyance". One of her jobs was correcting fraudulent names and information she had created to secure exit visas for refugees. She worked for the United Nations in Poland after the war, but returned to Britain and thence to Canada in 1948 after catching typhoid. Her fragile health was complicated by diabetes. She spent some time as a patient in a mental hospital before again becoming a school teacher. In 1971 while teaching in Edmonton she cut her foot. The wound became septic and she died on 7 April 1971.

After her death, her family endowed the Beatrice Wellington Gonzales Memorial Scholarship at the University of British Columbia and cited her "strenuous and successful efforts to protect and salvage the lives of political refugees in Europe before and during World War II. In making this award, special consideration will be given to students who like Miss Gonzales are concerned about the plight of individuals."
