= British Committee for Refugees from Czechoslovakia =

Refugee aid organisation

The British Committee for Refugees from Czechoslovakia (BCRC), later the Czechoslovak Refugee Trust Fund, was a non-governmental organisation established in Prague in late September 1938, in the lead up to the Second World War and in response to the large number of refugees fleeing areas under control of Nazi Germany. Its purpose was to give humanitarian aid to refugees and resettle some of them in the United Kingdom or other countries. The BCRC aided political refugees, especially Social Democrats and communists, as well as Jews and their families, who fled Nazi Germany or the regions it annexed during 1938 (Austria, in March, and the Sudetenland, in October). The BCRC was initially funded by public donations and appeals following the Munich Agreement in September 1938 and ensuing German occupation of the Sudetenland. In January 1939 the British government gave £4,000,000 to Czechoslovakia for assistance to refugees and their resettlement in other countries.

Headed by Doreen Warriner and, later, Beatrice Wellington, the BCRC functioned in Czechoslovakia from September 1938 until mid-August 1939. The Second World War began on 1 September 1939 with the German invasion of Poland. The BCRC was an umbrella and coordinating organisation with cooperative ties to many other humanitarian organisations, national and international, in Czechoslovakia. The United Kingdom accepted about 12,000 of the refugees, including 669 children unaccompanied by their parents in what is called the kindertransport. An unknown number assisted by the BCRC or other organisations escaped to other countries.

== Background ==
Adolf Hitler and the Nazi party's accession to power in Germany in 1933 led to the flight of 4,000 refugees, mostly communists or Jews, to Czechoslovakia. Most found homes in other countries. A trickle of refugees continued. At the time of the Munich Agreement (30 September 1938) 5,000 German and Austrian refugees were in Czechoslovakia. With the Munich Agreement, which ceded to Germany the region of Czechoslovakia known as the Sudetenland, the flow of refugees increased. Kristallnacht, the anti-Jewish riots in Germany on 9-10 November 1938, also stimulated the flight of refugees.

In 1934, 29 non-governmental organisations were assisting refugees in Czechoslovakia. International humanitarian organisations also began to help. The American Friends Service Committee began helping German and Austrian refugees in 1936. The Jewish Immigrant Aid organisation HICEM established an office in Prague in 1936. The predecessor to the Unitarian Service Committee, an American organisation, began operating in Czechoslovakia in 1939. Waitstill and Martha Sharp were the Unitarian representatives. Two of the most important financial and political supporters of the BCRC were The Observer newspaper fund and the British Labour Party.

At first, the priority of the humanitarian organisations in Czechoslovakia was to provide humanitarian assistance to refugees but they turned toward evacuating vulnerable refugees in 1938 and early 1939 as the Germans dismantled Czechoslovakia. A "grassroots transnational network of escape facilitated leaving Nazi-occupied Europe," in the words of Laura E. Brade. "This network connected Boston-based Unitarians, London-based socialists, and Prague-based Jewish social workers in a complex web of interfaith refugee assistance."

In September 1938, the BCRC was created in Britain. It was financed with a donation of £80,000 collected by the Lord Mayor's Appeal. The new organisation started slowly. The initial priority of BCRC was to help Social Democrats who had fled Sudeten when Germany took over the region.

== Doreen Warriner ==
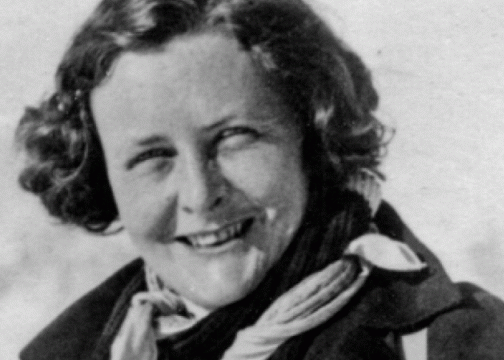
Doreen Warriner

Doreen Warriner, a British academic, came to Prague on 13 September 1938. She was unaffiliated with any organisation and had a small amount of money she had raised. At the end of November she was asked to be the BCRC representative in Czechoslovakia and she became the leader and a source of funding for the international humanitarian organisations in Czechoslovakia.

In November 1938, the number of registered refugees in Czechoslovakia was 92,000. An additional 150,000, mostly Jews, were unregistered, fearing that registering might make them targets. The most threatened refugees were believed by the BCRC to be leftist German men, especially those from the Sudetenland who were in danger of being imprisoned or deported. The German refugees were housed in camps outside Prague. A distinction was drawn between the Germans who were considered "political" refugees and the Jews who were considered "economic" refugees and thus were of lesser priority. Often dubbed as "conscience money" because of the British sacrifice of Czechoslovakia in the Munich Agreement, the British government granted £4,000,000 to the Czech government to support and resettle the refugees in countries which would accept them. £500,000 of the grant were earmarked to resettle Jewish refugees in Mandatory Palestine. With the German takeover in March 1939, the remaining balance was retrieved by Britain to be used for resettlement of Czech refugees. From October 1938 to March 1939, the BCRC enabled 3,500 refugees to resettle in Britain. Many of the refugees exited Czechoslovakia and journeyed to Britain on forged or false documents supplied them by Warriner and her associates.

The working environment for the BCRC worsened after the Germans invaded most of what remained of Czechoslovakia on 15 March 1939 and established a puppet state. Warriner led BCRC until 24 April 1939 when she learned that she would soon be arrested by the German Gestapo and left the country.

== Beatrice Wellington ==
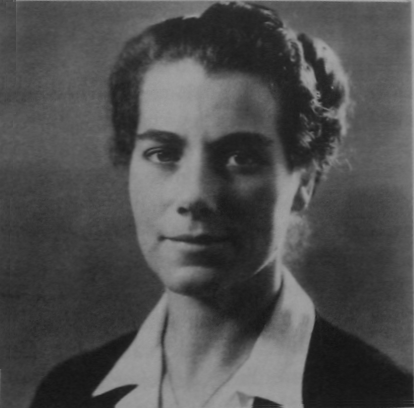
Beatrice Wellington

Beatrice Wellington, a Canadian Quaker, arrived in Czechoslovakia in fall 1938 and quickly became known for her ability to acquire false documents for endangered refugees. After Warriner's departure on 24 April, Wellington led the BCRC's coalition of humanitarian organisations in Prague. The situation was increasingly dangerous and many humanitarian workers left the country. Wellington was arrested and questioned at length by the Gestapo on 14 and 15 April. Despite that experience, she did not join the exodus of humanitarian workers from Czechoslovakia. All BCRC staff except Wellington and Trevor Chadwick returned to Britain by 9 May. Wellington was left alone in the office in Prague.

When Wellington took over the BCRC, funds were running short and plans in Britain were afoot to abolish it. Wellington, however, was determined to obtain permission for some 500 women and children to depart Czechoslovakia. Almost daily, she turned up at the office of Gestapo official Karl Bömelburg requesting -- and in many cases receiving -- exit permits for the women and children on her list of vulnerable refugees. She was described as the only person who could help the "dangerous" refugee cases: "Czech democrats, political leaders, Jews, Catholics and Socialists." She resisted orders by the BCRC in London to leave Czechoslovakia.

The BCRC was replaced and absorbed on 21 July 1939 by the Czech Refugee Trust Fund which was controlled by the British government, ending many of the free-wheeling (and often illegal under Czech and German laws) activities of the humanitarian community in Czechoslovakia. On 25 July the Germans ordered all foreign refugee workers to leave the country. Wellington departed Prague on 3 August 1939, one month before Britain declared war on Nazi Germany.

== The kindertransport ==
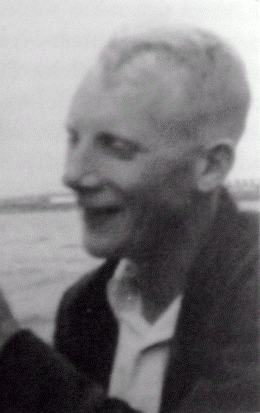
Trevor Chadwick

The most storied activity of the BCRC was the kindertransport: the evacuation of 669 refugee children out of Czechoslovakia and their resettlement with British families in the United Kingdom. Most of the children were Jewish and none of them were accompanied by their parents. The resettlement was initially seen as temporary, only until the immediate threat to their families in Czechoslovakia was resolved. Instead, the Second World War began and the children remained in Britain for the remainder of the war and, in most cases, as British citizens thereafter.

The kindertransport refers only to those children who were evacuated without parents. The kindertransport was necessary because the British were more lenient in permitting child refugees to enter the country than adult refugees. The parents agreed to be separated from their children because they could not obtain exit permits from Czechoslovakia or permission to be resettled in Britain or other countries.

Nicholas Winton, a British stockbroker, spent three weeks in Czechoslovakia in December 1938 and January 1939 and drew up a list of children, mostly Sudetenland refugees, both Jewish and German, needing to leave Czechoslovakia due to the threat to their parents by the Nazis. It was Trevor Chadwick, a British schoolteacher, and Czech politician Antonin Sum, who asserted that Jewishness was the characteristic that most endangered children, whatever their place of origin. Chadwick became the head of the kindertransport programme of the BCRC. He offered to evacuate 100 children per week if sponsors and homes for them in Britain or elsewhere could be found for them. Chadwick organised and accompanied the first kindertransport out of Czechoslovakia by air on 14 March 1939. He carried a message back to London about the dire humanitarian situation in Czechoslovakia from American Waitstill Sharp. He organised additional groups of children and accompanied them by railroad. Chadwick left Czechoslovakia quickly in early June 1939, probably to avoid arrest by the Gestapo for forging identification papers for the children. With the departure of Chadwick, Frantisec Ullmann and the Jewish Religious Community took charge of organising the kindertransport.

The eighth and last attempt to transport children out of Czechoslovakia was 1 September 1939 when 250 children waited without success at the Prague railway station for the train to depart. The German invasion of Poland began that day and the borders were closed. Of the 250 children due to leave on that train, only two survived the war. Most of the children probably died in Nazi concentration camps.

== Other individuals and organisations ==
A number of humanitarian organisations and individuals collaborated with the BCRC in Czechoslovakia. These included Quakers Tessa and Jean Rowntree and Mary Penman; Unitarians E. Rosalind Lee and H. J. McLachlan, the afore-mentioned Americans, Waitstill and Martha Sharp; and the Czech Marie Schmolka of HICEM, a Jewish emigration organisation. Margaret Layton was the secretary of the BCRC in London. British diplomat Robert J. Stopford in the British Legation was the official liaison of the BCRC, especially useful in managing relations with the German occupiers to get exit visas for refugees. The Gestapo's Karl Bömelburg was Stopford's and BRCR's liaison with the Germans and their source for the all-important exit documents. He was forthcoming with exit documents for Jews as the Germans at the time were happy for Jews to leave while opposing the emigration of "political" refugees, which included many Jews. The American Consul-General in Prague, Irving N. Linnell, kept (against regulations) Waitstill Sharp's operating funds in his office safe to protect them from German confiscation.

== Results ==
The numbers of refugees who succeeded in leaving Czechoslovakia is uncertain. A later accounting attributed humanitarian organisations with facilitating the emigration of 12,000 refugees from Czechoslovakia to the United Kingdom in 1938 until the end of 1939. Many of the Czechs who had taken refuge in several different European countries were not admitted to Britain until after the beginning of the Second World War on 1 September 1939 and the demise of the BCRC. The composition of the refugees (Jews were not tallied separately) was: 6,000 Czechoslovaks, 3,000 Sudeten Germans, 300 Czech minorities, 1,000 Reich Germans, 800 Austrians, and 800 unclassified persons. Most of the refugees remained in Britain, but 1,100 refugees emigrated to Canada, 250 families to Palestine, and 200 families to Sweden. Almost 400 emigrated to other parts of the British Empire, the United States, and South America.

Those refugees who escaped Czechoslovakia without assistance from humanitarian organisations are estimated to have numbered 4,000 to 8,000.

== Czech Refugee Trust Fund ==
The Czech Refugee Trust Fund (CRTF) was created on 12 July 1939 by the British government to assist refugees from Czechoslovakia and to care for them in Britain until they could be resettled elsewhere. The Trust absorbed the BCRC and its 170 employees. The Trust existed until 1975.

In January 1940, the Trust was accused of being "dominated by Communists, British and foreign". The British security agency, MI5, investigated the Trust and continued its surveillance of it and its employees throughout the Second World War even though the Soviet Union and the United Kingdom were, after the German invasion of the Soviet Union in 1941, allies against Germany.

== See also ==
- Occupation of Czechoslovakia (1938–1945)
- Trevor Chadwick
- Donald A. Lowrie
- Tessa Rowntree
- Martha Sharp
- Waitstill Sharp
- Doreen Warriner
- Beatrice Wellington
- Nicholas Winton
