= Dartford Borough Council elections =

Local government elections in Kent, England

Dartford Borough Council is the local authority for the Borough of Dartford in Kent, England. The council is elected every four years.

== Composition calculator ==
Composition of the council
Year	Conservative	Labour	Green	Independents & Others	Council control after election
Local government reorganisation; council established (44 seats)
1973	14	30	–	0	Labour
New ward boundaries (45 seats)
1976	20	25	0	0	Labour
1979	22	23	0	0	Labour
1983	26	15	0	4	Conservative
New ward boundaries (47 seats)
1987	29	16	0	2	Conservative
1991	25	20	0	2	Conservative
1995	10	36	0	1	Labour
1999	14	28	0	5	Labour
New ward boundaries (44 seats)
2003	21	17	0	6 (Note: 5 Residents Association, 1 New England Party)	No overall control
2007	26	12	0	6 (Note: 6 Residents Association)	Conservative
2011	31	9	0	4 (Note: 4 Residents Association)	Conservative
2015	34	7	0	3 (Note: 3 Residents Association)	Conservative
New ward boundaries (42 seats)
2019	29	10	0	3 (Note: 3 Residents Association)	Conservative
2023	29	11	1	1 (Note: 1 Residents Association)	Conservative

== Results maps ==
2003 results map

2007 results map

2011 results map

2015 results map

2019 results map

2023 results map

== By-election results ==
=== 1995-1999 ===
Galley Hill By-Election 27 November 1997
Party	Candidate	Votes	%	±%
Residents Association		245	54.8	+54.8
Labour		165	36.9	+7.3
Independent Labour		20	4.5	−43.8
Independent Democrat		17	3.8	+3.8
Majority		80	17.9	
Turnout		447	19.0	
Residents gain from Independent Labour		Swing		

Longfield By-Election 27 November 1997
Party	Candidate	Votes	%	±%
Conservative		410	45.4	+9.5
Residents Association		314	34.8	+34.8
Labour		179	19.8	−3.5
Majority		96	10.6	
Turnout		903	23.0	
Conservative hold		Swing		

Maypole By-Election 27 November 1997 (2)
Party	Candidate	Votes	%	±%
Conservative		407	29.1	
Conservative		403	28.8	
Labour		237	16.9	
Labour		232	16.6	
Liberal Democrats		122	8.7	
Turnout		1,401	28.0	
Conservative hold		Swing		

=== 1999-2003 ===
Greenhithe By-Election 7 June 2001
Party	Candidate	Votes	%	±%
Labour	Brian Francis	794	48.4	+3.4
Conservative	Shiela East	521	31.8	+31.8
Independent	Wayne Cunningham	326	19.9	+19.9
Majority		273	16.6	
Turnout		1,641		
Labour gain from Residents		Swing		

Joyce Green By-Election 21 February 2002
Party	Candidate	Votes	%	±%
Labour	Matthew Bryant	375	73.4	+0.5
Conservative	Shirley Burton	77	15.1	−0.3
UKIP	Mark Croucher	59	11.5	+11.5
Majority		298	58.3	
Turnout		511	19.2	
Labour hold		Swing		

Sutton at Hone and Hawley By-Election 21 February 2002
Party	Candidate	Votes	%	±%
Conservative	Anthony Martin	617	53.7	−8.2
Labour	Stephen de Winton	533	46.3	+8.2
Majority		84	7.4	
Turnout		1,150	36.2	
Conservative hold		Swing		

=== 2003-2007 ===
Longfield, New Barn & Southfleet By-Election 19 June 2003 (3)
Party	Candidate	Votes	%	±%
Conservative	Jeremy Kite	1,417	22.0	
Conservative	(Robert) Alexander Dunn	1,393	21.6	
Conservative	Albert Bassam	1,383	21.5	
Independent	(Mary) Noreen Salway	715	11.1	
Independent	Frederick Grainger	402	6.3	
Independent	Anthony Mack	364	5.7	
Labour	Alistair Jordan	326	5.1	
Liberal Democrats	Sonia Keane	168	2.6	
Liberal Democrats	Andrew Reeves	143	2.2	
Liberal Democrats	Mathias Toth	124	1.9	
Turnout		6,435	45.6	
Conservative hold		Swing		
Conservative hold		Swing		
Conservative hold		Swing		

This election was scheduled as part of the council elections of 1 May 2003. It was delayed following the death of Bob Dunn (who was standing for re-election), just one week before the ballot.

Heath By-Election 27 July 2006
Party	Candidate	Votes	%	±%
Conservative	Andrew Lloyd	637	35.1	
Labour	Patrick Kelly	518	28.6	
BNP	Kevin Saunders	240	13.2	
UKIP	Robert Wiltshire	179	9.9	
English Democrat	Steven Uncles	174	9.6	
Green	Stuart Jeffery	65	3.6	
Majority		119	6.5	
Turnout		1,818	37.95	
Conservative hold		Swing		

Princes By-Election 21 February 2008
Party	Candidate	Votes	%	±%
Labour	Patrick Kelly	592	50.2	+9.8
Conservative	Jean Shippam	348	29.5	+5.2
English Democrat	Mike Tibby	198	16.8	−4.9
Liberal Democrats	Amanda Martin	22	1.9	+1.9
UKIP	Arnold Tarling	19	1.6	−12.1
Majority		244	20.7	
Turnout		1,179	27.0	
Labour hold		Swing		

=== 2011-2015 ===
Castle By-Election 27 September 2012
Party	Candidate	Votes	%	±%
Conservative	Paul Cutler	191	43.02	
Labour	Hayley Louisa Reece	111	25.00	
UKIP	Stephen Wilders	60	13.51	
Swanscombe and Greenhithe Residents Association	Vic Openshaw	50	11.26	
English Democrat	Frances Elizabeth Moore	32	7.21	
Majority		80		
Turnout		444	26.86	
Conservative hold		Swing		

Newtown By-election - Thursday 27 June 2013
Party	Candidate	Votes	%	±%
Labour	David John Baker	536	45.42	
Conservative	Rosanna Marina Currans	376	31.86	
UKIP	Ivan Paul Burch	268	22.71	
Majority		160		
Turnout		1180	23.01	
Labour gain from Conservative		Swing		

The by-election was held following the resignation of Conservative Cllr Gary Reynolds.

Swanscombe By-Election, 5 December 2013
Party	Candidate	Votes	%	±%
Labour	Steve Jacqueline Doran	274	29.43	
Swanscombe and Greenhithe Residents Association	Vic Openshaw	273	29.32	
UKIP	Stephen Wilders	200	21.48	
Independent	Richard John Lees	146	15.68	
Conservative	Steven Ronald Jarnell	38	4.08	
Majority		1		
Turnout		931	17.56	
Labour gain from Residents		Swing		

The by-election resulted from the death of Swanscombe and Greenhithe Residents Association Cllr Leslie Bobby.

Stone By-Election, 27 March 2014
Party	Candidate	Votes	%	±%
Labour	Catherine Stafford	426	37.7	−3.8
Conservative	Stephanie Thredgle	397	35.1	−11.0
UKIP	Jim Moore	307	27.2	+27.2
Majority		29	2.6	
Turnout		1,130		
Labour hold		Swing		

The by-election was held following the resignation of Labour Cllr John Adams.

Brent By-Election, 13 November 2014
Party	Candidate	Votes	%	±%
Conservative	Rosanna Currans	579	42.0	−10.8
Labour	Mark Maddison	482	35.0	−0.7
UKIP	Shan-E-Din Choycha	316	22.9	+22.9
Majority		97	7.0	
Turnout		1,377		
Conservative hold		Swing		

The by-election was held following the death of Conservative Cllr Nancy Wightman.

Littlebrook By-Election, 13 November 2014
Party	Candidate	Votes	%	±%
Labour	Daisy Page	358	47.7	−7.1
UKIP	Sonia Keane	220	29.3	+29.3
Conservative	Calvin McLean	172	22.9	−1.1
Majority		138	18.4	
Turnout		750		
Labour hold		Swing		

The by-election was held following the death of Labour Cllr John Muckle.

=== 2019-2023 ===
Darenth By-Election, 6 May 2021
Party	Candidate	Votes	%	±%
Conservative	Maria Kelly	252	49.9	+2.6
Labour	Bill Cook	218	43.2	+11.6
Reform	Howard Bostridge	35	6.9	+6.9
Majority		34	6.7	
Turnout		505		
Conservative hold		Swing		

The by-election was held following the resignation of Conservative Cllr Ian Armitt.

Wilmington, Sutton-at-Hone and Hawley By-Election, 6 May 2021
Party	Candidate	Votes	%	±%
Conservative	Ellenor Palmer	1,465	73.3	+22.4
Labour	Maria Perry	445	22.3	+8.8
Reform	Barry Taylor	88	4.4	+4.4
Majority		1,020	51.1	
Turnout		1,998		
Conservative hold		Swing		

The by-election was held following the resignation of Conservative Cllr Calvin McLean.

Maypole and Leyton Cross By-Election, 27 January 2022
Party	Candidate	Votes	%	±%
Conservative	Kyle Stealey	334	63.1	−21.1
Green	Julian Hood	76	14.4	+14.4
Labour	Leah Uwaibi	65	12.3	−3.5
Liberal Democrats	Kyle Marsh	54	10.2	+10.2
Majority		258	48.8	
Turnout		529		
Conservative hold		Swing		

The by-election was held following the death of Conservative Cllr Ann Allen.

Wilmington, Sutton-at-Hone and Hawley By-Election, 27 January 2022
Party	Candidate	Votes	%	±%
Conservative	George Holt	996	67.8	+16.9
Labour	Maria Perry	272	18.5	+5.0
Liberal Democrats	Jane Hatzimasouras	200	13.6	+13.6
Majority		724	49.3	
Turnout		1,468		
Conservative hold		Swing		

The by-election was held following the resignation of Conservative Cllr Lucas Reynolds.

=== 2023-2027 ===
Greenhithe and Knockhall By-Election, 21 November 2024
Party	Candidate	Votes	%	±%
Reform	Michael Brown	284	31.2	
Residents	Dawn Johnston	251	27.6	
Green	Sacha Gosine	150	13.5	
Labour	Peter Summers	113	12.4	
Conservative	Edith Nwachukwu	112	12.3	
Majority		33	3.6	
Turnout		910	16.1	
Reform gain from Residents		Swing		

The by-election was held after the death of Swanscombe and Greenhithe Residents' Association Cllr Peter Harman.

Maypole and Leyton Cross By-Election, 17 July 2025
Party	Candidate	Votes	%	±%
Reform	Stephen Ridley	303	53.8	+53.8
Conservative	Campbell Steven	158	28.1	−40.6
Labour	David Johnson-Lang	71	12.6	−18.6
Green	Lewis Glynn	31	5.5	+5.5
Majority		145	25.8	
Turnout		563		
Reform gain from Conservative		Swing		

The by-election was held after the resignation of Conservative Cllr Kyle Stealey.

Stone House By-Election, 17 July 2025
Party	Candidate	Votes	%	±%
Reform	James Buchan	475	45.2	
Labour	Suneetha Giridhar	299	28.4	
Conservative	Milan Suter	190	18.1	
Green	Julian Hood	87	8.3	
Majority		176	16.7	
Turnout		1,051		
Reform gain from Conservative		Swing		

The by-election was held after the resignation of Conservative Cllr Tom Oliver.
