= Dartford (constituency) =

Parliamentary constituency in the United Kingdom, 1885 onwards

Coordinates: 51.43°N 0.25°E

- County constituency for the House of Commons
- Interactive map of boundaries from 2024
- Boundary of Dartford in South East England
- County: Kent
- Electorate: 72,048 (2023)
- Major settlements: Dartford

Current constituency
- Created: 1885
- Member of Parliament: Jim Dickson (Labour)
- Seats: One
- Created from: West Kent

Dartford is a constituency (Note: A county constituency (for the purposes of election expenses and type of returning officer)) in Kent represented in the House of Commons of the UK Parliament by Jim Dickson of the Labour Party since 2024.

It is currently the longest-running bellwether constituency in the UK, having voted for an MP of the party which formed the government in every General Election since 1964.

== Constituency profile ==
The Dartford constituency is located in Kent and lies just outside the boundaries of Greater London. It is roughly coterminous with the local government district of the same name. The constituency covers the large town of Dartford and its surrounding settlements, including the small town of Swanscombe and the villages of Greenhithe, Longfield and Maypole. Dartford has an industrial heritage and was a centre for cement, flour and paper manufacturing until the decline of industry in the 20th century. Today Dartford serves as a commuter town and is connected to central London by the Southeastern and Thameslink rail services.

Compared to the rest of the country, residents of the constituency have average levels of education and professional employment and above-average household income. At the 2021 census, White people made up 73% of the population, Black people were 11% and Asians were 10%. At the local borough council, most of the constituency is represented by Conservatives with some Labour councillors in Swanscombe and parts of Dartford. At the county council, all wards in the constituency elected Reform UK councillors. Voters in the constituency strongly supported leaving the European Union in the 2016 referendum, with an estimated 64% in favour of Brexit.

== History ==
The seat was created under the Redistribution of Seats Act 1885. This Act added a net 18 seats, but its main purpose was to correct the over-representation of minor, if often old,boroughs and of depopulated county divisions. In their place were created new seats with a larger population. In Kent the Act finally abolished the Sandwich constituency, which sent two MPs until 1885. It also halved the representation of no fewer than four other historic towns. In contrast a seat for Dartford, the North-Western Division of Kent or North West Kent, was created.

The area of the seat, remaining a combination of urban, suburban and a small rural population, has been gradually reduced through its territory being contributed to new constituencies, their county designation later being changed in 1965 to become part of the new county of Greater London, which adjoins Dartford. These seats were Bexley, created in 1945, and Erith & Crayford, created in 1955.

Political history

In the early 20th century, the Dartford constituency was very much a bellwether. Dartford's results later shifted towards the left: in a by-election in 1938 and then in the general elections from 1951 to 1959, a Labour candidate won, going against the national result.

Since 1964, however, Dartford has alternated between Labour and the Conservatives in line with the national result, and has thus served as a bellwether again. Indeed, as of the 2024 General Election it is the longest-running bellwether constituency in the United Kingdom. Candidates for the largest two parties nationally have also polled first and second since 1923 in Dartford.

This was the first constituency contested by future Prime Minister Margaret Thatcher (then Margaret Roberts). She was the Conservative candidate at the 1950 and 1951 general elections, unsuccessful on both occasions.

== Boundaries ==
Map of boundaries 2010–2024

1885–1918: The Sessional Division of Dartford, and part of the Sessional Division of Bromley.

1918–1945: The Urban Districts of Bexley, Dartford, and Erith, and in the Rural District of Dartford the parishes of Crayford, Stone, and Swanscombe.

1945–1955: The Boroughs of Dartford and Erith, and the Urban District of Crayford.

1955–1974: The Borough of Dartford, the Urban District of Swanscombe, and the Rural District of Dartford.

1974–1983: The Borough of Dartford, the Urban District of Swanscombe, and in the Rural District of Dartford the parishes of Darenth, Southfleet, Stone, Sutton-at-Hone, and Wilmington.

1983–1997: The Borough of Dartford, and the District of Sevenoaks wards of Ash-cum-Ridley, Fawkham and Hartley, Horton Kirby, and Longfield.

1997–2010: The Borough of Dartford, and the District of Sevenoaks wards of Fawkham and Hartley, and Horton Kirby.

2010–2024: The Borough of Dartford, and the District of Sevenoaks ward of Hartley and Hodsoll Street.

2024–present: The Borough of Dartford wards of Bean & Village Park, Brent, Burnham, Darenth, Ebbsfleet, Greenhithe & Knockhall, Heath, Joyden's Wood, Longfield, New Barn & Southfleet, Maypole & Leyton Cross, Newtown, Princes, Stone Castle, Stone House, Swanscombe, Temple Hill, Town, and West Hill.

The electorate was reduced to bring it within the permitted range by transferring the District of Sevenoaks ward of Hartley and Hodsoll Street to Tonbridge and the Dartford Borough ward of Wilmington, Sutton-at-Hone & Hawley to Sevenoaks.

== Members of Parliament ==
West Kent prior to 1885

Election	Member	Party	Notes
1885	William Hart Dyke	Conservative	Member for Mid Kent (1868–1885)
1906	James Rowlands	Liberal	Member for Finsbury East (1886–1895)
Jan 1910	William Foot Mitchell	Conservative	
Dec 1910	James Rowlands	Liberal	
1916	James Rowlands	Coalition Liberal	Died March 1920
1920 by-election	John Edmund Mills	Labour	
1922	George Jarrett	National Liberal	
Nov 1923	George Jarrett	Constitutionalist	
1923	John Edmund Mills	Labour	
1924	Angus McDonnell	Conservative	
1929	John Edmund Mills	Labour	
1931	Frank Clarke	Conservative	Died July 1938
1938 by-election	Jennie Adamson	Labour	Contested Bexley following redistribution
Constituency split, with half becoming the new Bexley seat
1945	Norman Dodds	Labour Co-operative	Contested Erith and Crayford following redistribution
Constituency split, majority renamed Erith and Crayford, minority merged with parts of Chislehurst and Orpington
1955	Sydney Irving	Labour Co-operative	Deputy Speaker of the House of Commons (1968–1970)
1970	Peter Trew	Conservative	
Feb 1974	Sydney Irving	Labour Co-operative	
1979	Bob Dunn	Conservative	
1997	Howard Stoate	Labour	
2010	Gareth Johnson	Conservative	
2024	Jim Dickson	Labour	Leader of Lambeth London Borough Council (1994–2000)

== Elections ==
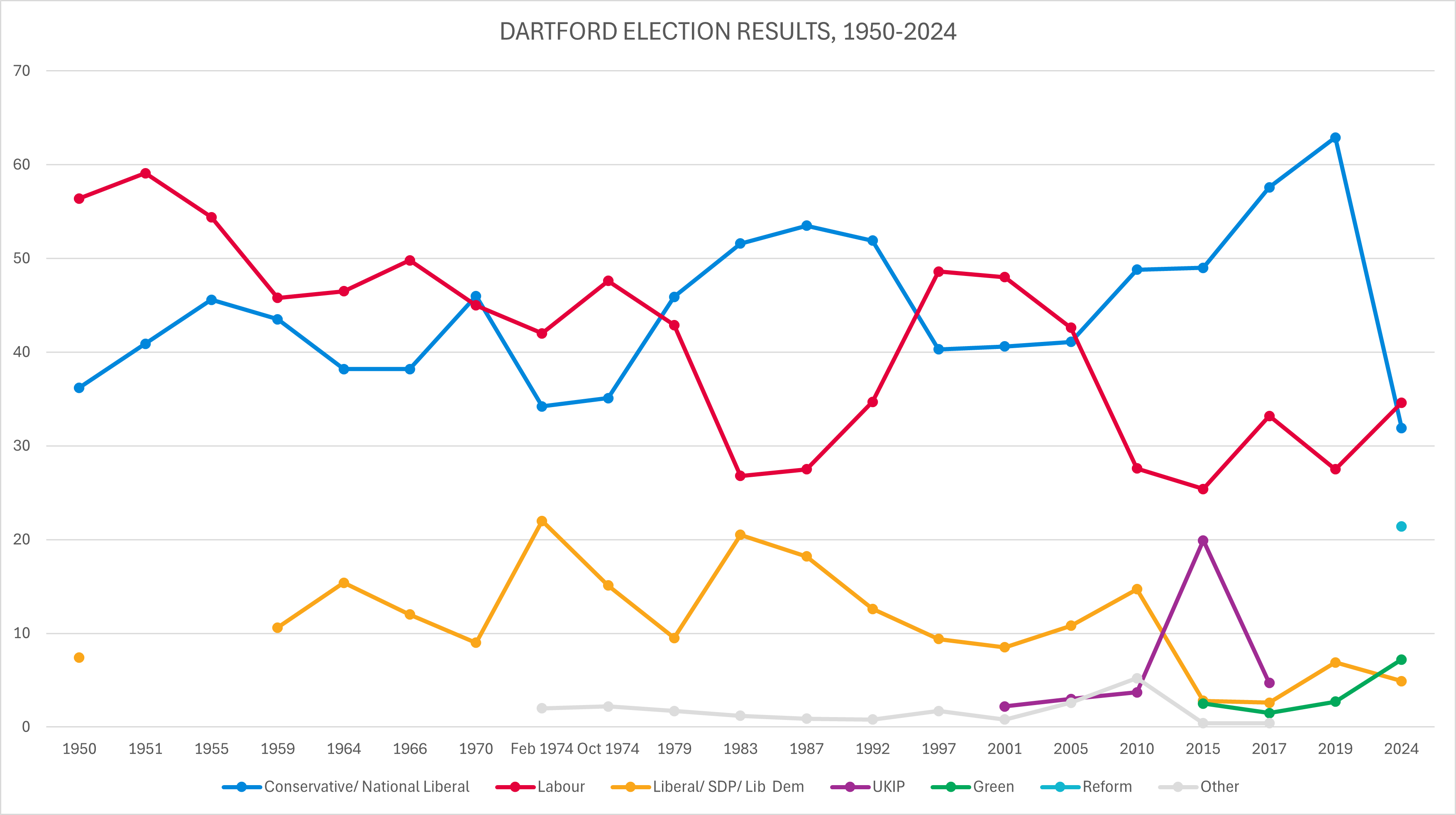
Election results 1950-2024

=== Elections in the 2020s ===
General election 2024: Dartford
Party	Candidate	Votes	%	±%
Labour	Jim Dickson	15,392	34.6	+5.1
Conservative	Gareth Johnson	14,200	31.9	−29.2
Reform	Lee Stranders	9,523	21.4	N/A
Green	Laura Edie	3,189	7.2	+4.8
Liberal Democrats	Kyle Marsh	2,184	4.9	−2.1
Majority		1,192	2.7	N/A
Turnout		44,488	59.0	–5.5
Registered electors		75,426		
Labour gain from Conservative		Swing	+18.1	

=== Elections in the 2010s ===
2019 notional result
Party	Vote	%
Conservative	28,413	61.1
Labour	13,709	29.5
Liberal Democrats	3,251	7.0
Green	1,115	2.4
Turnout	46,488	64.5
Electorate	72,048	

General election 2019: Dartford
Party	Candidate	Votes	%	±%
Conservative	Gareth Johnson	34,006	62.9	+5.3
Labour	Sacha Gosine	14,846	27.5	−5.7
Liberal Democrats	Kyle Marsh	3,736	6.9	+4.3
Green	Mark Lindop	1,435	2.7	+1.2
Majority		19,160	35.4	+11.0
Turnout		54,023	65.7	−4.1
Conservative hold		Swing	+5.6	

General election 2017: Dartford
Party	Candidate	Votes	%	±%
Conservative	Gareth Johnson	31,210	57.6	+8.6
Labour	Bachchu Kaini	18,024	33.2	+7.8
UKIP	Ben Fryer	2,544	4.7	−15.2
Liberal Democrats	Simon Beard	1,428	2.6	−0.2
Green	Andrew Blatchford	807	1.5	−1.0
Independent	Ola Adewunmi	211	0.4	N/A
Majority		13,186	24.4	+0.8
Turnout		54,224	69.8	+1.4
Conservative hold		Swing	+0.4	

General election 2015: Dartford
Party	Candidate	Votes	%	±%
Conservative	Gareth Johnson	25,670	49.0	+0.2
Labour	Simon Thomson	13,325	25.4	−2.2
UKIP	Elizabeth Jones	10,434	19.9	+16.2
Liberal Democrats	Simon Beard	1,454	2.8	−11.9
Green	Andy Blatchford	1,324	2.5	N/A
English Democrat	Steve Uncles	211	0.4	−3.9
Majority		12,345	23.6	+2.4
Turnout		52,418	68.4	+2.7
Conservative hold		Swing	+1.2	

General election 2010: Dartford
Party	Candidate	Votes	%	±%
Conservative	Gareth Johnson	24,428	48.8	+7.6
Labour	John Adams	13,800	27.6	−15.5
Liberal Democrats	James Willis	7,361	14.7	+4.6
English Democrat	Gary Rogers	2,178	4.3	+1.7
UKIP	Richard Palmer	1,842	3.7	+0.7
Independent	Stephane Tindame	264	0.5	N/A
Fancy Dress Party	Ernie Crockford	207	0.4	N/A
Majority		10,628	21.2	N/A
Turnout		50,080	65.7	+2.4
Conservative gain from Labour		Swing	+11.6	

=== Elections in the 2000s ===
General election 2005: Dartford
Party	Candidate	Votes	%	±%
Labour	Howard Stoate	19,909	42.6	−5.4
Conservative	Gareth Johnson	19,203	41.1	+0.5
Liberal Democrats	Peter Bucklitsch	5,036	10.8	+2.3
UKIP	Mark Croucher	1,407	3.0	+0.8
New England	Michael Tibby	1,224	2.6	N/A
Majority		706	1.5	−5.9
Turnout		46,779	63.2	+1.3
Labour hold		Swing	−2.9	

General election 2001: Dartford
Party	Candidate	Votes	%	±%
Labour	Howard Stoate	21,466	48.0	−0.6
Conservative	Bob Dunn	18,160	40.6	+0.3
Liberal Democrats	Graham Morgan	3,781	8.5	−0.9
UKIP	Mark Croucher	989	2.2	N/A
Fancy Dress Party	Keith Davenport	344	0.8	+0.3
Majority		3,306	7.4	−0.9
Turnout		44,740	61.9	−12.7
Labour hold		Swing		

=== Elections in the 1990s ===
General election 1997: Dartford
Party	Candidate	Votes	%	±%
Labour	Howard Stoate	25,278	48.6	+12.4
Conservative	Bob Dunn	20,950	40.3	−10.6
Liberal Democrats	Dorothy Webb	4,872	9.4	−2.8
BNP	Paul McHale	424	0.8	N/A
Fancy Dress Party	Peter Homden	287	0.5	+0.1
Christian Democrat	James Pollitt	228	0.4	N/A
Majority		4,328	8.3	N/A
Turnout		52,039	74.6	
Labour gain from Conservative		Swing		

General election 1992: Dartford
Party	Candidate	Votes	%	±%
Conservative	Bob Dunn	31,194	51.9	−1.6
Labour	Howard Stoate	20,880	34.7	+7.2
Liberal Democrats	Peter Bryden	7,584	12.6	−5.6
Fancy Dress Party	A Munro	262	0.4	−0.5
Natural Law	Angela Holland	241	0.4	N/A
Majority		10,314	17.2	−8.8
Turnout		60,161	83.1	+4.1
Conservative hold		Swing	−4.4	

=== Elections in the 1980s ===
General election 1987: Dartford
Party	Candidate	Votes	%	±%
Conservative	Bob Dunn	30,685	53.5	+1.9
Labour	Barrie Clarke	15,756	27.5	+0.7
SDP	Michael Bruce	10,439	18.2	−2.3
Fancy Dress Party	Keith Davenport	491	0.9	+0.2
Majority		14,929	26.0	+1.2
Turnout		57,371	79.0	+2.6
Conservative hold		Swing	+0.6	

General election 1983: Dartford
Party	Candidate	Votes	%	±%
Conservative	Bob Dunn	28,199	51.6	+8.7
Labour	David Townsend	14,636	26.8	−19.1
Liberal	John Mills	11,204	20.5	+10.9
Fancy Dress Party	A Crockford	374	0.7	0.0
National Front	GE Nye	282	0.5	−0.2
Majority		13,563	24.8	+21.8
Turnout		54,695	76.4	−4.0
Conservative hold		Swing	+10.9	

=== Elections in the 1970s ===
General election 1979: Dartford
Party	Candidate	Votes	%	±%
Conservative	Bob Dunn	21,195	45.9	+10.8
Labour Co-op	Sydney Irving	19,803	42.9	−4.8
Liberal	Ian Josephs	4,407	9.5	−5.6
National Front	I Nobbs	476	1.0	−1.1
Fancy Dress Party	J Beddowes	328	0.7	N/A
Majority		1,392	3.0	−9.5
Turnout		46,209	80.4	+2.8
Conservative gain from Labour Co-op		Swing	+7.8	

General election October 1974: Dartford
Party	Candidate	Votes	%	±%
Labour Co-op	Sydney Irving	20,817	47.6	+5.7
Conservative	Graham Bright	15,331	35.1	+0.9
Liberal	George H Dunk	6,606	15.1	−6.7
National Front	RH Aldous	939	2.1	+0.1
Majority		5,486	12.6	+4.8
Turnout		43,693	76.6	−6.8
Labour Co-op hold		Swing	+2.4	

General election February 1974: Dartford
Party	Candidate	Votes	%	±%
Labour Co-op	Sydney Irving	19,803	42.0	−3.1
Conservative	Peter Trew	16,149	34.2	−11.7
Liberal	Ian Josephs	10,273	21.8	+12.8
National Front	RH Aldous	945	2.0	N/A
Majority		3,654	7.7	+6.8
Turnout		47,170	83.4	+9.4
Labour Co-op gain from Conservative		Swing	+4.3	

General election 1970: Dartford
Party	Candidate	Votes	%	±%
Conservative	Peter Trew	27,822	46.0	+7.8
Labour Co-op	Sydney Irving	27,262	45.0	−4.8
Liberal	J Paul Johnson	5,453	9.0	−3.0
Majority		560	0.9	−10.7
Turnout		60,537	74.0	−6.8
Conservative gain from Labour Co-op		Swing	+6.3	

=== Elections in the 1960s ===
General election 1966: Dartford
Party	Candidate	Votes	%	±%
Labour Co-op	Sydney Irving	29,547	49.8	+3.4
Conservative	Peter Trew	22,638	38.2	0.0
Liberal	Peter Loftus	7,094	12.0	−3.4
Majority		6,909	11.7	+3.4
Turnout		59,279	80.8	−0.7
Labour Co-op hold		Swing	+1.7	

General election 1964: Dartford
Party	Candidate	Votes	%	±%
Labour Co-op	Sydney Irving	27,371	46.5	+0.6
Conservative	James J Davis	22,496	38.2	−5.3
Liberal	Morris Janis	9,047	15.4	+4.7
Majority		4,875	8.3	+6.0
Turnout		58,914	81.5	−1.5
Labour Co-op hold		Swing	+3.0	

=== Elections in the 1950s ===
General election 1959: Dartford
Party	Candidate	Votes	%	±%
Labour Co-op	Sydney Irving	25,323	45.8	−8.6
Conservative	Peter Walker	24,047	43.5	−2.1
Liberal	Barry Charles Davis	5,881	10.6	N/A
Majority		1,276	2.3	−6.5
Turnout		55,251	83.0	+2.0
Labour Co-op hold		Swing	−3.2	

General election 1955: Dartford
Party	Candidate	Votes	%
Labour Co-op	Sydney Irving	25,928	54.4
Conservative	Peter Walker	21,730	45.6
Majority		4,198	8.8
Turnout		47,658	81.0
Labour Co-op win (new boundaries)			

General election 1951: Dartford
Party	Candidate	Votes	%	±%
Labour Co-op	Norman Dodds	40,094	59.1	+2.7
Conservative	Margaret Roberts	27,760	40.9	+4.7
Majority		12,334	18.2	−2.0
Turnout		67,854	85.2	−0.3
Labour Co-op hold		Swing	−1.0	

General election 1950: Dartford
Party	Candidate	Votes	%	±%
Labour Co-op	Norman Dodds	38,128	56.4	−12.0
Conservative	Margaret Roberts	24,490	36.2	+4.6
Liberal	Anthony H. Giles	5,011	7.4	N/A
Majority		13,638	20.2	−16.6
Turnout		67,629	85.5	+10.6
Labour Co-op hold		Swing	−8.3	

=== Election in the 1940s ===
General election 1945: Dartford
Party	Candidate	Votes	%
Labour Co-op	Norman Dodds	36,665	68.38
Conservative	Ralph Ernest Watkins Grubb	16,951	31.62
Majority		19,714	36.76
Turnout		53,616	74.89
Registered electors			
Labour Co-op win (new boundaries)			

- 1945 saw radical boundary changes, with half the constituency becoming part of the Bexley seat.

=== Elections in the 1930s ===
1938 Dartford by-election
Party	Candidate	Votes	%	±%
Labour	Jennie Adamson	46,514	52.39	
Conservative	Godfrey Mitchell	42,276	47.61	
Majority		4,238	4.78	N/A
Turnout		88,790	68.00	
Labour gain from Conservative		Swing		

General election 1935: Dartford
Party	Candidate	Votes	%	±%
Conservative	Frank Clarke	38,242	51.79	
Labour	Jennie Adamson	35,596	48.21	
Majority		2,646	3.58	
Turnout		73,838	69.63	
Conservative hold		Swing		

General election 1931: Dartford
Party	Candidate	Votes	%	±%
Conservative	Frank Clarke	34,095	55.49	
Labour	John Edmund Mills	27,349	44.51	
Majority		6,746	10.98	N/A
Turnout		61,444	79.01	
Conservative gain from Labour		Swing		

=== Elections in the 1920s ===
General election 1929: Dartford
Party	Candidate	Votes	%	±%
Labour	John Edmund Mills	26,871	50.6	+1.6
Unionist	Ashley Edwards	16,568	31.2	−19.8
Liberal	John Woolfenden Williamson	9,689	18.2	N/A
Majority		10,303	19.4	N/A
Turnout		53,128	76.9	−2.3
Registered electors		69,070		
Labour gain from Unionist		Swing	+10.7	

General election 1924: Dartford
Party	Candidate	Votes	%	±%
Unionist	Angus McDonnell	20,108	51.0	+5.2
Labour	John Edmund Mills	19,352	49.0	−5.2
Majority		756	3.0	N/A
Turnout		39,460	79.2	+9.2
Registered electors		49,804		
Unionist gain from Labour		Swing	+5.2	

General election 1923: Dartford
Party	Candidate	Votes	%	±%
Labour	John Edmund Mills	18,329	54.2	+10.3
Constitutionalist (Unionist)	George Jarrett	15,500	45.8	−3.8
Majority		2,829	8.4	N/A
Turnout		33,829	70.0	−1.2
Registered electors		48,320		
Labour gain from Liberal		Swing	+7.1	

Alison Garland

General election 1922: Dartford
Party	Candidate	Votes	%	±%
National Liberal	George Jarrett	16,662	49.6	–21.8
Labour	John Edmund Mills	14,744	43.9	+15.3
Liberal	Alison Garland	2,175	6.5	N/A
Majority		1,918	5.7	–37.1
Turnout		33,581	71.2	+23.3
Registered electors		47,132		
National Liberal hold		Swing	–18.6	

1920 Dartford by-election
Party		Candidate	Votes	%	±%
	Labour	John Edmund Mills	13,610	50.2	+21.6
	Liberal	Thomas Wing	4,562	16.8	N/A
C	Unionist	Richard Meller	4,221	15.5	N/A
	National	Reginald Applin	2,952	10.9	N/A
	Ind. Unionist	Frank Emil Fehr	1,802	6.6	N/A
Majority			9,048	33.4	N/A
Turnout			27,147	61.3	+13.4
Registered electors			44,281		
	Labour gain from National Liberal		Swing	N/A	
C indicates candidate endorsed by the coalition government.

=== Elections in the 1910s ===
Rowlands

General election 1918: Dartford
Party		Candidate	Votes	%
C	National Liberal	James Rowlands	15,626	71.4
	Labour	William Ling	6,256	28.6
Majority			9,370	42.8
Turnout			21,892	47.9
Registered electors			45,666	
	National Liberal win (new boundaries)			
C indicates candidate endorsed by the coalition government.

General Election 1914–15:

Another General Election was required to take place before the end of 1915. The political parties had been making preparations for an election to take place and by July 1914, the following candidates had been selected;

- Liberal: James Rowlands
- Unionist:

General election December 1910: Dartford
Party	Candidate	Votes	%	±%
Lib-Lab	James Rowlands	9,152	50.6	+2.8
Conservative	William Foot Mitchell	8,918	49.4	−2.8
Majority		234	1.2	N/A
Turnout		18,070	84.4	−3.4
Registered electors		21,398		
Lib-Lab gain from Conservative		Swing	+2.8	

General election January 1910: Dartford
Party	Candidate	Votes	%	±%
Conservative	William Foot Mitchell	9,807	52.2	+10.8
Lib-Lab	James Rowlands	8,990	47.8	−10.8
Majority		817	4.4	N/A
Turnout		18,797	87.8	+5.4
Registered electors		21,398		
Conservative gain from Lib-Lab		Swing	+10.8	

=== Elections in the 1900s ===
Rowlands

General election 1906: Dartford
Party	Candidate	Votes	%	±%
Lib-Lab	James Rowlands	9,532	58.6	N/A
Conservative	William Hart Dyke	6,728	41.4	N/A
Majority		2,804	17.2	N/A
Turnout		16,260	82.4	N/A
Registered electors		19,741		
Lib-Lab gain from Conservative		Swing	N/A	

General election 1900: Dartford
Party	Candidate	Votes	%	±%
Conservative	William Hart Dyke	Unopposed		
Conservative hold				

=== Elections in the 1890s ===
General election 1895: Dartford
Party	Candidate	Votes	%	±%
Conservative	William Hart Dyke	5,699	55.6	+2.7
Liberal	Patteson Nickalls	4,557	44.4	−2.7
Majority		1,142	11.2	+5.4
Turnout		10,256	73.8	+3.4
Registered electors		13,888		
Conservative hold		Swing	+2.7	

General election 1892: Dartford
Party	Candidate	Votes	%	±%
Conservative	William Hart Dyke	5,294	52.9	−5.7
Liberal	Jeremiah Lyon	4,722	47.1	+5.7
Majority		572	5.8	−11.4
Turnout		10,016	70.4	+6.3
Registered electors		14,227		
Conservative hold		Swing	−5.7	

=== Elections in the 1880s ===
By-election, 2 Feb 1887: Dartford
Party	Candidate	Votes	%	±%
Conservative	William Hart Dyke	Unopposed		
Conservative hold				

- Caused by Dyke's appointment as Vice-president of the Committee of the Council on Education.

General election 1886: Dartford
Party	Candidate	Votes	%	±%
Conservative	William Hart Dyke	4,198	58.6	+5.8
Liberal	James Ebenezer Saunders	2,965	41.4	−5.8
Majority		1,233	17.2	+11.6
Turnout		7,163	64.1	−11.9
Registered electors		11,173		
Conservative hold		Swing	+5.8	

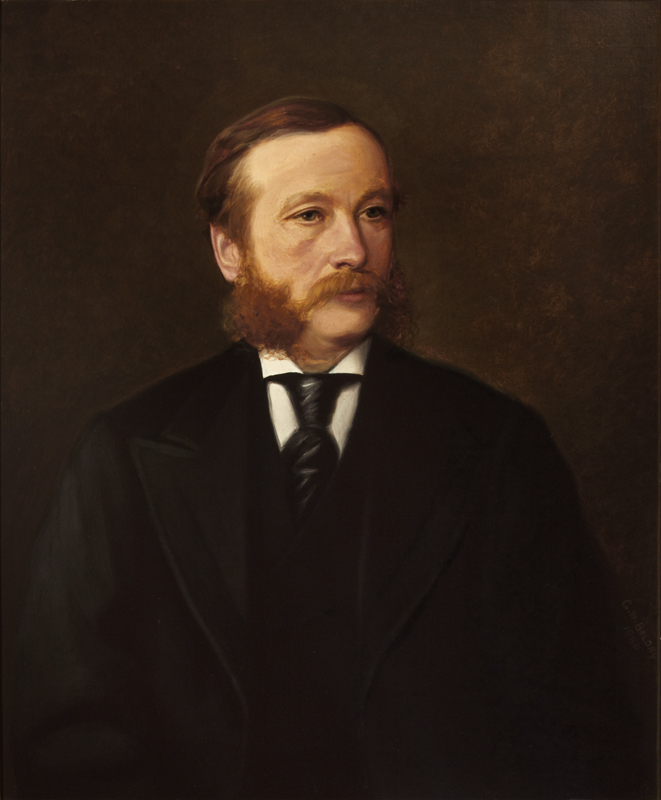
Dyke

General election 1885: Dartford
Party	Candidate	Votes	%
Conservative	William Hart Dyke	4,488	52.8
Liberal	James Ebenezer Saunders	4,006	47.2
Majority		482	5.6
Turnout		8,494	76.0
Registered electors		11,173	
Conservative win (new seat)			

== See also ==
- List of parliamentary constituencies in Kent
- List of parliamentary constituencies in the South East England (region)
