= Mary Barnett =

Mary Barnett may refer to:

- Mary Angela Barnett (born 1949), birth name of Angie Bowie, model
- Dame Mary Henrietta Barnett (1905–1985), Director of Women's Royal Air Force
- Mary Barnett in Dartford Borough Council election, 2011
