= Gareth Johnson =

British politician

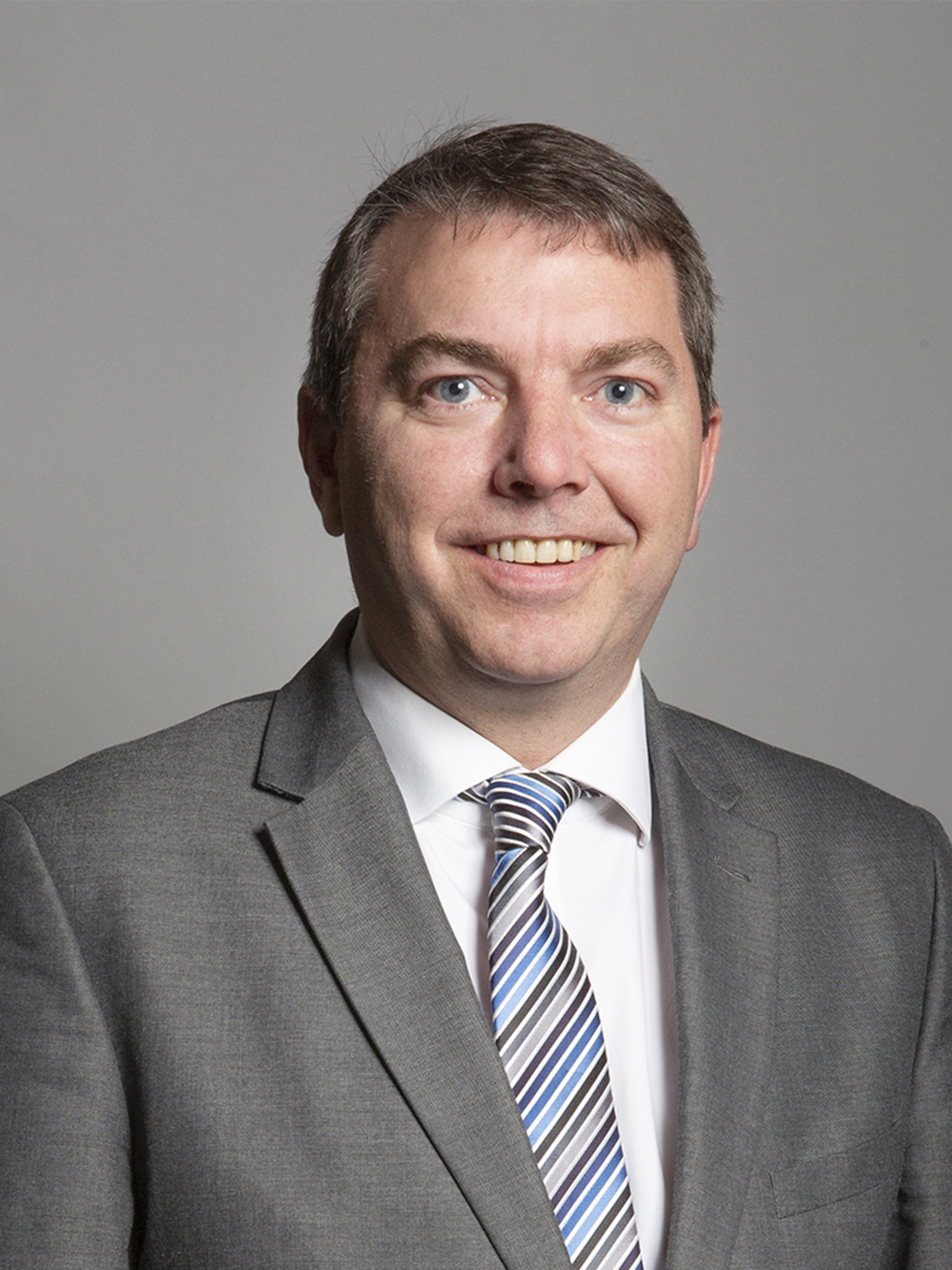
- Official portrait, 2019

Parliamentary Under-Secretary of State for Courts
- In office 20 September 2022 – 27 October 2022 Serving with Mike Freer
- Prime Minister: Liz Truss
- Preceded by: Sarah Dines (Note: As Parliamentary Under-Secretary of State for Justice.)
- Succeeded by: Mike Freer (Note: As Parliamentary Under-Secretary of State for Courts and Legal Services.)
Whip offices
Lord Commissioner of the Treasury
In office 9 February 2022 – 20 September 2022
Prime Minister	Boris Johnson
Preceded by	Craig Whittaker
Assistant Government Whip
In office 20 September 2021 – 9 February 2022
Prime Minister	Boris Johnson
Succeeded by	Sarah Dines
In office 5 November 2018 – 14 January 2019
Prime Minister	Theresa May
Preceded by	Jeremy Quin
Succeeded by	Alister Jack

Member of Parliament for Dartford
- In office 6 May 2010 – 30 May 2024
- Preceded by: Howard Stoate
- Succeeded by: Jim Dickson

Member of Bexley London Borough Council for Christchurch
- In office 7 May 1998 – 2 May 2002

Personal details
- Born: 12 October 1969 (age 56) Bromley, London, England
- Party: Conservative
- Spouse: Wendy Morris (m. 1997)
- Children: 2
- Education: The College of Law
- Profession: Solicitor
- Website: www.garethjohnsonmp.co.uk

Gareth Alan Johnson (born 12 October 1969) is a British politician and former lawyer who served as the Member of Parliament (MP) for Dartford from 2010 to 2024. A member of the Conservative party, he served as Parliamentary Under-Secretary of State for Courts from September to October 2022 in the Truss ministry. Johnson previously served as a Lord Commissioner of the Treasury from February to September 2022 and Assistant Government Whip from 2018 to 2019 and 2021 to 2022.

== Early life and career ==
Gareth Johnson was born in Bromley on 12 October 1969, the son of a milkman. He attended Dartford Grammar School. Before entering politics, Johnson worked in the Magistrates Court Service and as a solicitor in Dartford. He served for a time on the Board of Governors of Dartford Grammar School for Girls.

In local elections Johnson stood unsuccessfully as the Conservative candidate in the Danson ward of the London Borough of Bexley in 1994, before being elected in the Christchurch ward in 1998. He served one term of four years and did not stand for re-election in 2002. He served as Constituency chairman for the Conservative Party in Bexley.

== Parliamentary career ==
At the 2001 general election, Johnson stood as the Conservative candidate in Lewisham West, coming second with 22.4% of the vote behind the incumbent Labour MP Jim Dowd.

Johnson stood in Dartford at the 2005 general election, coming second with 41.1% of the vote behind the incumbent Labour MP Howard Stoate.

At the 2010 general election, Johnson was elected to Parliament as MP for Dartford with 48.8% of the vote and a majority of 10,628.

In the 2014 reshuffle he became Parliamentary Private Secretary (PPS) to David Gauke, the newly promoted Financial Secretary to the Treasury.

Johnson was re-elected as MP for Dartford at the 2015 general election with an increased vote share of 49% and an increased majority of 12,345. Following the election, he was made PPS to Matt Hancock, Paymaster General of the Cabinet Office.

Johnson was listed as being the chair of the All Party Parliamentary Group (APPG) on the Dominican Republic in December 2015. He previously served as the vice-chairman of both the Retail APPG and the British Sikhs APPG. Johnson has also previously been a member of both the Child and Youth Crime APPG and the BBC APPG. In January 2016, he led a Westminster Hall debate on congestion at the Dartford Crossing. Johnson previously served on the Justice Select Committee, the Human Rights Joint Committee and the Science and Technology Select Committee.

At the snap 2017 general election, Johnson was again re-elected with an increased vote share of 57.6% and an increased majority of 13,186. He was appointed Assistant Government Whip in November 2018, resigning on 14 January 2019 in disagreement with Prime Minister Theresa May's policy for Britain leaving the European Union.

Johnson was again re-elected at the 2019 general election with an increased vote share of 62.9% and an increased majority of 19,160. He was appointed Assistant Government Whip in the September 2021 cabinet reshuffle. On 9 February 2022, he was appointed Lord Commissioner of the Treasury, succeeding Craig Whittaker.

He endorsed Liz Truss in the July–September 2022 Conservative Party leadership election.

On 20 September 2022, he was appointed by Truss to be Parliamentary Under-Secretary of State for Justice in the Ministry of Justice. On 27 October, he was dismissed by Prime Minister Rishi Sunak.

He endorsed Boris Johnson in the October 2022 Conservative Party Leadership Election, but he did not end up standing. In March 2023, Prime Minister Rishi Sunak appointed Gareth Johnson as his Trade Envoy to the United Arab Emirates. This was the first time the UK had appointed a Trade Envoy to the UAE.

In the 2024 general election, Johnson lost his seat to Labour Party candidate Jim Dickson by 1,192 votes.

== Personal life ==
Johnson lives in the village of Hartley with his wife Wendy and their two children.

Johnson employed his wife as a part-time Parliamentary Assistant on a salary up to £25,000. He was listed in a 2015 article in The Daily Telegraph criticising the practice of MPs employing family members, on the lines that it promotes nepotism. Although MPs who were first elected in 2017 were banned from employing family members, the restriction was not retrospective – which meant that Johnson's employment of his wife was lawful.

== Notes ==
Parliament of the United Kingdom
Preceded by Howard Stoate	Member of Parliament for Dartford; 2010–2024	Succeeded by Jim Dickson
