= Maypole, Dartford =

Coordinates: 51°26′03″N 0°10′26″E

Maypole
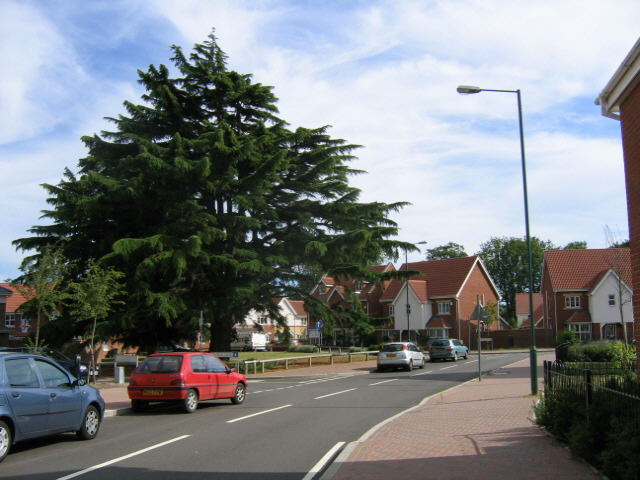

- Location within Kent
- OS grid reference: TQ5173
- District: Dartford
- Shire county: Kent
- Region: South East
- Country: England
- Sovereign state: United Kingdom
- Post town: Dartford
- Postcode district: DA13
- Police: Kent
- Fire: Kent
- Ambulance: South East Coast
- UK Parliament: Dartford

Maypole is a village in the Borough of Dartford in Kent, England. It is located north of Joyden's Wood and south-west of the town of Dartford. In the 2021 census, Maypole had a population of 1,960.
