= 1999 Dartford Borough Council election =

1999 UK local government election

Elections to Dartford Borough Council were held on 6 May 1999. The whole council was up for election. The Labour Party retained an overall majority on the council.

== Election result ==
Dartford Borough Council Election Result 1999
| Party | Seats | Gains | Losses | Net gain/loss | Seats % | Votes % | Votes | +/− |
|---|---|---|---|---|---|---|---|---|
| Labour | 28 | 0 | 6 | -6 | | | | |
| Conservative | 14 | 4 | 0 | +4 | | | | |
| Residents | 4 | 3 | 1 | +2 | | | | |
| Independent | 1 | 0 | 0 | 0 | | | | |

== Ward results ==
Bean (1)
| Party | Candidate | Votes | % | ±% |
|---|---|---|---|---|
| Conservative | David Alan Hammock | 412 | 74.9% | +24.1% |
| Labour | D. W. Whybrow | 138 | 25.1% | −24.1% |
| Turnout | | 550 | 44.8% | −6.9% |
| Conservative hold | | Swing | +24.1 | |

Brent (3)
| Party | Candidate | Votes | % | ±% |
|---|---|---|---|---|
| Labour | Michael George Dando | 837 | | |
| Labour | Margaret Anne Eaton | 803 | | |
| Labour | Rosemary Bryant | 802 | | |
| Conservative | S. A. Howson | 508 | | |
| Conservative | E. F. H. Prior | 499 | | |
| Conservative | J. M. Horley | 487 | | |
| Turnout | | | 33.2% | −15.1 |
| Labour hold | | Swing | | |
| Labour hold | | Swing | | |
| Labour hold | | Swing | | |

Darenth (2)
| Party | Candidate | Votes | % | ±% |
|---|---|---|---|---|
| Labour | Samson Patrick Carey | 597 | | |
| Labour | Thomas William Cook | 596 | | |
| Conservative | B.W. Ballard | 274 | | |
| Conservative | John Kirby | 250 | | |
| Turnout | | | 31.5% | −11.5 |
| Labour hold | | Swing | | |
| Labour hold | | Swing | | |

Galley Hill (2)
| Party | Candidate | Votes | % | ±% |
|---|---|---|---|---|
| Independent | Michael Arthur Crosby | 304 | | |
| Residents | J.B. Harvey | 195 | | |
| Labour | Howard Graham Dold | 184 | | |
| Residents | M.D.G. Jackson | 137 | | |
| Labour | A.M. Fulcher | 135 | | |
| Independent | Barry G. Poppy | 57 | | |
| Turnout | | | 24.8% | |
| Independent hold | | Swing | | |
| Residents hold | | Swing | | |

Greenhithe (2)
| Party | Candidate | Votes | % | ±% |
|---|---|---|---|---|
| Residents | Conrad Broadley | 335 | | |
| Residents | G.H. Jones | 324 | | |
| Labour | Marion J. Lawrie | 273 | | |
| Labour | T.G. Parry | 267 | | |
| Turnout | | | 20.5% | |
| Residents gain from Labour | | Swing | | |
| Residents gain from Labour | | Swing | | |

Gundulf (3)
| Party | Candidate | Votes | % | ±% |
|---|---|---|---|---|
| Labour | Deborah Jane Stoate | 847 | | |
| Labour | A.C. Batty | 832 | | |
| Labour | Geoffrey Truscott Prout | 820 | | |
| Conservative | Dorothy M. Shakespeare | 513 | | |
| Conservative | Alan H. Horley | 492 | | |
| Conservative | James N. Wedgbury | 477 | | |
| Turnout | | | 42.0% | |
| Labour hold | | Swing | | |
| Labour hold | | Swing | | |
| Labour hold | | Swing | | |

Heath (3)
| Party | Candidate | Votes | % | ±% |
|---|---|---|---|---|
| Conservative | Terence Charles Harry Smith | 878 | | |
| Conservative | Kenneth Frank Martin Leadbeater | 848 | | |
| Conservative | Patricia Anne Thurlow | 816 | | |
| Labour | Marilyn Sharon May | 722 | | |
| Labour | D.J.M. Stock | 711 | | |
| Labour | G.M. Street | 682 | | |
| Turnout | | | 39.5% | |
| Conservative gain from Labour | | Swing | | |
| Conservative gain from Labour | | Swing | | |
| Conservative hold | | Swing | | |

Horns Cross (1)
| Party | Candidate | Votes | % | ±% |
|---|---|---|---|---|
| Labour | Ivor Thomas Noel Jones | 239 | | |
| Independent | J.T. Read | 127 | | |
| Conservative | Christopher C. Muller | 45 | | |
| Turnout | | | 30.7% | |
| Labour hold | | Swing | | |

Joyce Green (2)
| Party | Candidate | Votes | % | ±% |
|---|---|---|---|---|
| Labour | Ann Muckle | 493 | | |
| Labour | Leonard Eaton | 488 | | |
| Conservative | J.A. Simpson | 104 | | |
| Conservative | Jennifer Ann Rickwood | 98 | | |
| Liberal Democrats | D. Buchanan | 79 | | |
| Turnout | | | 25.6% | |
| Labour hold | | Swing | | |
| Labour hold | | Swing | | |

Littlebrook (2)
| Party | Candidate | Votes | % | ±% |
|---|---|---|---|---|
| Labour | John Ivan Muckle | 562 | | |
| Labour | Andrew Sawford | 490 | | |
| Conservative | D.W. Davies | 175 | | |
| Conservative | P.A. Newell | 171 | | |
| Turnout | | | 25.5% | |
| Labour hold | | Swing | | |
| Labour hold | | Swing | | |

Longfield (3)
| Party | Candidate | Votes | % | ±% |
|---|---|---|---|---|
| Conservative | Robert John Dunn | 904 | | |
| Conservative | Albert Raymond Bassam | 865 | | |
| Conservative | Jeremy Alan Kite | 842 | | |
| Residents | R.C. Higgins | 463 | | |
| Residents | R.J. Eagles | 433 | | |
| Residents | J.L. Rice | 352 | | |
| Labour | Alistair Jordan | 290 | | |
| Labour | Peter Beckett | 259 | | |
| Labour | Maureen Anna Jansseune | 254 | | |
| Turnout | | | 40.8% | |
| Conservative hold | | Swing | | |
| Conservative hold | | Swing | | |
| Conservative gain from Residents | | Swing | | |

Maypole (2)
| Party | Candidate | Votes | % | ±% |
|---|---|---|---|---|
| Conservative | Richard J Hamilton | 559 | | |
| Conservative | C. Brown | 555 | | |
| Labour | Anne Elizabeth Burke | 300 | | |
| Labour | Stephen John Sherrell | 284 | | |
| Turnout | | | 32.7% | |
| Conservative hold | | Swing | | |
| Conservative hold | | Swing | | |

Miskin (2)
| Party | Candidate | Votes | % | ±% |
|---|---|---|---|---|
| Labour | Francis Gerald Byrne | 536 | | |
| Labour | Trevor Alan Rogers | 499 | | |
| Conservative | Edward John Lampkin | 468 | | |
| Conservative | Robert A. Marr | 445 | | |
| Turnout | | | 42.8% | |
| Labour hold | | Swing | | |
| Labour hold | | Swing | | |

Newtown (3)
| Party | Candidate | Votes | % | ±% |
|---|---|---|---|---|
| Labour | David John Baker | 713 | | |
| Labour | Austen Raymond Brooker | 697 | | |
| Labour | Graham Christopher David Steele | 636 | | |
| Conservative | Robert John Etheridge | 327 | | |
| Conservative | A.J. Salway | 323 | | |
| Conservative | Doreen Edna Coleman | 311 | | |
| Turnout | | | 27.4% | |
| Labour hold | | Swing | | |
| Labour hold | | Swing | | |
| Labour hold | | Swing | | |

Princes (3)
| Party | Candidate | Votes | % | ±% |
|---|---|---|---|---|
| Labour | David May | 747 | | |
| Labour | Margaret Anne Stock | 702 | | |
| Labour | Victor William Stock | 650 | | |
| Conservative | Murdo Macleod | 224 | | |
| Conservative | Richard Stewart Mortimer Green | 221 | | |
| Conservative | Edna May Oborne | 209 | | |
| Independent | P.J. Ripley | 92 | | |
| Turnout | | | 25.9% | |
| Labour hold | | Swing | | |
| Labour hold | | Swing | | |
| Labour hold | | Swing | | |

Priory (1)
| Party | Candidate | Votes | % | ±% |
|---|---|---|---|---|
| Labour | B.P. Wood | 260 | | |
| Conservative | M.J. O'Neill | 155 | | |
| Turnout | | | 24.8% | |
| Labour hold | | Swing | | |

Southfleet (1)
| Party | Candidate | Votes | % | ±% |
|---|---|---|---|---|
| Conservative | Mary Noreen Salway | 387 | | |
| Labour | Julie Dando | 81 | | |
| Turnout | | | 44.5% | |
| Conservative hold | | Swing | | |

Stone (3)
| Party | Candidate | Votes | % | ±% |
|---|---|---|---|---|
| Labour | Harry Phillips | 620 | | |
| Labour | Derek Ernest Lawson | 609 | | |
| Labour | D.P. Ward | 576 | | |
| Conservative | Barbara Gladys May Bell | 333 | | |
| Conservative | Nancy Catherine Wightman | 319 | | |
| Conservative | P.T. Cole | 315 | | |
| Turnout | | | 20.3% | |
| Labour hold | | Swing | | |
| Labour hold | | Swing | | |
| Labour hold | | Swing | | |

Sutton At Hone and Hawley (2)
| Party | Candidate | Votes | % | ±% |
|---|---|---|---|---|
| Conservative | Patrick Francis Coleman | 775 | | |
| Conservative | Malcolm A Nothard | 653 | | |
| Labour | Stephen Robert David de Winton | 478 | | |
| Labour | Kenneth R Nicholls | 450 | | |
| Turnout | | | 38.3% | |
| Conservative hold | | Swing | | |
| Conservative gain from Labour | | Swing | | |

Swanscombe (2)
| Party | Candidate | Votes | % | ±% |
|---|---|---|---|---|
| Residents | Bryan Ernest Read | 357 | | |
| Labour | Malcolm J. Munn | 313 | | |
| Labour | P.R. Defty | 297 | | |
| Residents | W.S. Cunningham | 260 | | |
| Turnout | | | 29.8% | |
| Residents gain from Labour | | Swing | | |
| Labour hold | | Swing | | |

Wilmington Central (1)
| Party | Candidate | Votes | % | ±% |
|---|---|---|---|---|
| Labour | Paul W. James | 496 | | |
| Conservative | Derek Edward Hunnisett | 393 | | |
| Turnout | | | 49.1% | |
| Labour hold | | Swing | | |

Wilmington East (1)
| Party | Candidate | Votes | % | ±% |
|---|---|---|---|---|
| Labour | Thomas Anthony Maddison | 282 | 62.1% | +7.5% |
| Conservative | Marilyn Iris Peters | 172 | 37.9% | +7.8% |
| Turnout | | | 34.7% | |
| Labour hold | | Swing | | |

Wilmington West (2)
| Party | Candidate | Votes | % | ±% |
|---|---|---|---|---|
| Conservative | Ann Allen | 849 | | |
| Conservative | Lyn Mason | 781 | | |
| Labour | D. M. Brooker | 340 | | |
| Labour | J. W. Shoult | 340 | | |
| Turnout | | | 48.4% | |
| Conservative hold | | Swing | | |
| Conservative hold | | Swing | | |
