= John Woolfenden Williamson =

British writer

John Woolfenden Williamson (1869–1950) was a British writer about industrial networks in the first half of the 20th century.

Williamson was unable to complete a medical degree at the University of Edinburgh due to financial difficulties and became a teacher. He later obtained a B.Sc. degree from the Royal College of Science, and was called to the bar as a member of Gray's Inn in 1922. He wrote a number of papers on the interrelationship between law and science.

In 1920 he married the research botanist Helen Lee (née Chambers), who died in 1934.

From 1919 until his retirement in 1936 he was first secretary to the Scientific Instruments Research Association. He also sat on the governing board of the Imperial College of Science and Technology.

In 1929 he contested the general election as Liberal Party candidate for Dartford, coming third polling 18%.

In 1927 Lord Cadman, Chairman of the Anglo-Persian Oil Company, invited him to visit the Abadan Refinery to study the industrial development underway there. The resulting book led to an invitation from Lord Stamp to study the workings of the London, Midland and Scottish Railway, which provided the basis for a further book.

== Books ==
- In a Persian Oil Field: A Study in Scientific and Industrial Development (E. Benn, 1927; 2nd edition 1930)
- A British Railway Behind the Scenes: A Study in the Science of Industry (E. Benn, 1933)
- Railways To-day (Oxford University Press, 1946)
