= Fancy Dress Party =

- Leader: Steven Fumpleton
- President: Steven Canning
- Chairman: Lloyd John "Fancy Dress King" Taylor
- Secretary: Zachary Morton
- General Secretary: David Johnson
- First Secretary: Harold Johnson
- Secretary-General: Dick Ford
- Presidium: Iain Wright
- Spokesperson: Keenan Harrison, Gerald Stone, Zachary Morton
- Founders: John Beddoes, Finton Beddoes, Iain Wright
- Founded: 1979
- Dissolved: 2017
- Headquarters: Sidcup (1979-1991) / Dartford (1991-2015) / Bromley (since 2015)
- Ideology: Satire

The Fancy Dress Party was a political party in England. It was formed in 1979 as a frivolous alternative to the mainstream electoral parties, and can be seen as a forerunner of the more prominent Official Monster Raving Loony Party.

Candidates stood in the 1979 general election, with John Beddoes being nominated in Dartford. Other Fancy Dress Party candidates stood in Dartford in each of the general elections in 1983, 1987, 1992, 1997 and 2001, and the party remained on the register of political parties until 2017.

John 'Ernie' Crockford was the Fancy Dress Party's candidate for the 2010 general election. Keynote manifestos include rapidly building new schools using revolutionary inflatable classrooms making it easier for delinquent pupils to let the entire school down, reducing class sizes to 3'x2'6" and the abolition of student top-up fees; students should be entitled to full pints the same as everyone else.

== Policy positions ==
- Equip all Police Stations with state-of-the-art lavatories so that, whatever the crime, the police will always have something to go on.
- Increase prison sentences to at least 20 words.
- Double police numbers; in future, PC49 will be known as PC98.
- Add spelling to the "national kricklum"
- Put an end to the dumbing-down of exams by replacing A-levels with "jolly hard colouring tests".
- Put an end to secondary school classes of over 40 by only accepting children of under 39 years of age.
- Make cycling more attractive by banning the obese from wearing cycle shorts.
- Reduce Britain's carbon footprint by introducing solar-powered sun beds.
- Use a smaller font size to automatically reduce the unemployment statistics.

== See also ==
- List of frivolous political parties
