= Sydney Irving =

British politician (1918–1989)

Baron Irving of Dartford PC

Deputy Speaker of the House of Commons Chairman of Ways and Means
- In office 1 November 1968 – 18 June 1970
- Speaker: Horace King
- Preceded by: Eric Fletcher
- Succeeded by: Robert Grant-Ferris

Deputy Chairman of Ways and Means
- In office 22 April 1966 – 1 November 1968
- Speaker: Horace King
- Preceded by: Roderic Bowen
- Succeeded by: Harry Gourlay

Government Deputy Chief Whip in the House of Commons Treasurer of the Household
- In office 21 October 1964 – 11 April 1966
- Prime Minister: Harold Wilson
- Preceded by: Michael Hughes-Young
- Succeeded by: John Silkin

Member of Parliament for Dartford
- In office 28 February 1974 – 3 May 1979
- Preceded by: Peter Trew
- Succeeded by: Bob Dunn
- In office 26 May 1955 – 18 June 1970
- Preceded by: Bob Dunn
- Succeeded by: Peter Trew

Personal details
- Born: Sydney Irving; 1 July 1918
- Died: 18 December 1989 (aged 71)
- Party: Labour
- Other political affiliations: Co-operative
- Education: Pendower School; London School of Economics
- Occupation: Teacher

Sydney Irving, Baron Irving of Dartford PC (1 July 1918 – 18 December 1989) was a British Labour Co-operative politician.

== Early life and career ==
Irving was educated at Pendower School, Newcastle-upon-Tyne and the London School of Economics.

He was a school teacher and lecturer and served as an alderman on Dartford Borough Council.

== Political career ==
Irving was twice Member of Parliament for Dartford, originally elected in 1955. In Harold Wilson's Labour Government 1964-1970, he was the government's Deputy Chief Whip and Treasurer of the Household from 1964 to 1966, and served as a Deputy Speaker of the House of Commons from 1966 to 1970, when he lost his seat to the Conservatives. He was re-elected in 1974, but lost the seat again in 1979, to the Conservative Bob Dunn.

Subsequently, on 10 July 1979, Irving was created a life peer as Baron Irving of Dartford, of Dartford in the County of Kent.

Parliament of the United Kingdom
Preceded by Norman Dodds	Member of Parliament for Dartford; 1955 – 1970	Succeeded by Peter Trew
Preceded by Peter Trew	Member of Parliament for Dartford; 1974 – 1979	Succeeded by Bob Dunn
Political offices
Preceded by Michael Hughes-Young	Deputy Chief Whip of the House of Commons; Treasurer of the Household; 1964–1966	Succeeded by John Silkin
Party political offices
Preceded by Edward Short	Labour Deputy Chief Whip in the House of Commons; 1964–1966	Succeeded by John Silkin
