= Peter Trew =

Peter John Edward Trew (born 30 April 1932) is a former British Conservative Party politician. He has also been a civil engineer and company director.

At the 1970 general election, he was elected on his second attempt to become the member of parliament (MP) for Dartford, defeating Labour incumbent Sydney Irving by 560 votes. However, Irving regained the seat at the February 1974 general election.

Parliament of the United Kingdom
Preceded by Sydney Irving	Member of Parliament for Dartford; 1970 – Feb. 1974	Succeeded by Sydney Irving
