= Howard Stoate =

British politician

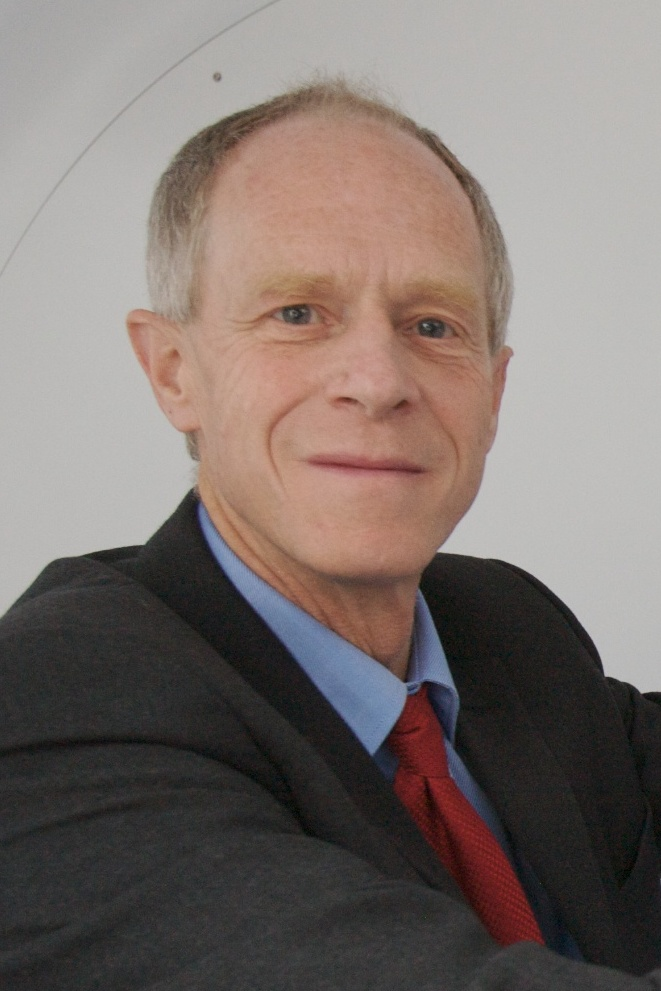
- Stoate in 2009

Member of Parliament for Dartford
- In office 1 May 1997 – 12 April 2010
- Preceded by: Bob Dunn
- Succeeded by: Gareth Johnson

Personal details
- Born: 14 April 1954 (age 72) Weymouth, Dorset, England
- Party: Labour
- Spouse: Deborah Dunkerley
- Education: King's College London

Howard Geoffrey Alvan Stoate (born 14 April 1954) is a British Labour Party politician who was the Member of Parliament (MP) for the Dartford constituency in Kent from 1997 to 2010.

== Early life ==
He studied at the independent Kingston Grammar School and later at King's College London, earning an MSc and Diploma of the RCOG (DRCOG). Stoate was a junior hospital doctor from 1977 to 1981, then a general practitioner in Bexleyheath from 1982, and a GP tutor at Queen Mary's Hospital in Sidcup from 1989. He was a Dartford Borough Councillor from 1990 to 1999, Chair of Finance 1995–97.

== Parliamentary career ==
Stoate was elected MP for Dartford in 1997, ousting the four-term Conservative incumbent Bob Dunn; he had previously contested the Dartford seat in 1992 and Old Bexley and Sidcup in 1987. Having won the seat, he was re-elected in 2001 and 2005. He served as Parliamentary Private Secretary to Estelle Morris between 2003 and 2005.

Stoate announced on 28 July 2009 that he would stand down at the next election.

He has also written a number of pamphlets for the Fabian Society including Challenging the Citadel in 2006.

== Subsequent career ==
On leaving Parliament he became Chair of the Bexley Clinical Commissioning Group, having continued to practice as a GP during his parliamentary career.

== Personal life ==
He married Deborah Dunkerley in 1979 in Dartford and they have two sons (born September 1984 and April 1987).

Parliament of the United Kingdom
Preceded by Bob Dunn	Member of Parliament for Dartford; 1997–2010	Succeeded by Gareth Johnson
