= 2007 Dartford Borough Council election =

2007 UK local government election

Results of the 2007 Dartford Borough Council election

The 2007 Dartford Borough Council election to the Dartford Borough Council was held on 3 May 2007 in Kent, England. The whole council was up for election and the Conservative Party took overall control of the council.

== Election result ==
Dartford Borough Council Election Result 2007
Party	Seats	Gains	Losses	Net gain/loss	Seats %	Votes %	Votes	+/−
Conservative	26	6	1	+5	59.1		28,081	
Labour	12	1	5	-4	27.3		19,117	
Residents	6	1	0	+1	13.6		4,592	
English Democrat	0	0	2	-2	0		5,545	
UKIP	0	0	0	0	0		1,026	
Independent	0	0	0	0	0		858	
BNP	0	0	0	0	0		328	
Peace	0	0	0	0	0		78	

== Ward results ==
Bean & Darenth (3)
Party	Candidate	Votes	%	±%
Conservative	David Alan Hammock	842		
Conservative	Ian Douglas Armitt	794		
Conservative	Rebecca Louise Shanks	760		
Labour	Bill Cook	511		
Labour	Neil Pearson-Coffey	452		
Labour	Derek Hills	401		
English Democrat	Peter Adamthwaite	283		
Turnout		4,043		
Conservative hold		Swing		
Conservative hold		Swing		

Brent (3)
Party	Candidate	Votes	%	±%
Conservative	Nancy Catherine Wightman	905		
Conservative	Steven Hamilton Brown	902		
Conservative	Amy Elizabeth Peters	874		
Labour	Sally Russell	707		
Labour	Garry Graham Sturley	661		
Labour	Dali Rai	646		
English Democrat	Ray Johnston	341		
English Democrat	Jerry Chatterton	331		
English Democrat	Lynne Gresley	315		
UKIP	Quentin Williamson	136		
Turnout		5,818		
Conservative hold		Swing		
Conservative hold		Swing		

Castle (1)
Party	Candidate	Votes	%	±%
Conservative	Sheila East	236	61	
Labour	Leila Pauline Blankley	78	20	
English Democrat	Frances Moore	76	19	
Turnout		390		
Conservative hold		Swing		

Greenhithe (3)
Party	Candidate	Votes	%	±%
Residents	Vic Openshaw	679		
Residents	Steve Johnston	607		
Residents	Pat Scanlan	584		
Conservative	Penny Cole	376		
Labour	John Wallace Masson	178		
Labour	Monica Lesley Masson	176		
Labour	Sarah Wimhurst	165		
Turnout		2,756		
Residents hold		Swing		
Residents gain from Conservative		Swing		

Heath (3)
Party	Candidate	Votes	%	±%
Conservative	Andrew Lloyd	1,065		
Conservative	Terry Smith	1,059		
Conservative	Patsy Thurlow	872		
English Democrat	John Griffiths	507		
Labour	Susan May Brooker	501		
Labour	Rosa Eva Sweetland	416		
Labour	Joyce Wise	404		
Turnout		4,824		
Conservative hold		Swing		
Conservative hold		Swing		

Joyce Green (2)
Party	Candidate	Votes	%	±%
Labour	Ann Muckle	487		
Labour	Matthew James Bryant	447		
BNP	Kevin Saunders	328		
Conservative	Terrence Raymond Martin	173		
UKIP	Ray Day	157		
Conservative	Ragbhir Singh Sandhu	109		
Turnout		1,701		
Labour hold		Swing		

Joydens Wood (3)
Party	Candidate	Votes	%	±%
Conservative	Ann Dorothy Allen	1,633		
Conservative	Marilyn Iris Peters	1,603		
Conservative	Jennifer Ann Rickwood	1,586		
English Democrat	Jackie Brookman	232		
Labour	Rosa Barnett	214		
Labour	Steve Burleigh	213		
Labour	Valerie Maddison	210		
Turnout		5,691		
Conservative hold		Swing		
Conservative hold		Swing		

Littlebrook (2)
Party	Candidate	Votes	%	±%
Labour	John Ivan Muckle	425		
Labour	Tom Maddison	391		
English Democrat	Mike Tibby	330		
English Democrat	Alex Vaughan	264		
Conservative	Raymond John Marsh	166		
Conservative	Brian Garden	138		
Turnout		1,714		
Labour hold		Swing		
Labour gain from English Democrat		Swing		

Longfield, New Barn and Southfleet (3)
Party	Candidate	Votes	%	±%
Conservative	Jeremy Alan Kite	1,559		
Conservative	Roger Stephen Leonard Perfitt	1,420		
Conservative	David Matthew Pickersgill	1,080		
Independent	(Mary) Noreen Salway	858		
Labour	Alec Jordan	353		
Labour	Peter Beckett	335		
Labour	Maureen Anna Jansseune	297		
English Democrat	Paul Cooper	172		
Turnout		6,074		
Conservative hold		Swing		
Conservative hold		Swing		

Newtown (3)
Party	Candidate	Votes	%	±%
Labour	David John Baker	760		
Conservative	Arron Bardoe	653		
Conservative	Chris Gallagher	627		
Labour	Paul Frederick Blankley	620		
Conservative	Avtar Sandhu	598		
Labour	Stephen Robert David de Winton	577		
English Democrat	Jim Read	319		
UKIP	Mark Christopher Croucher	228		
UKIP	Tracy Jane Latif	205		
Turnout		4,587		
Labour hold		Swing		
Conservative gain from Labour		Swing		
Conservative gain from English Democrat		Swing		

Princes (3)
Party	Candidate	Votes	%	±%
Labour	David Edward May	712		
Labour	Geoff Prout	657		
Labour	Margaret Anne Stock	656		
Conservative	Jean Carol Shippam	428		
English Democrat	Liz Painter	382		
Conservative	Drew Swinerd	363		
Conservative	Richard John Wells	362		
UKIP	Lauren Tawnee Sloan	241		
Turnout		3,801		
Labour hold		Swing		
Labour hold		Swing		

Stone (3)
Party	Candidate	Votes	%	±%
Labour	Rosie Bryant	570		
Labour	Christine Angell	566		
Labour	Derek Ernest Lawson	555		
Conservative	John Alan Jarvis	482		
Conservative	Thurza Richards	454		
Conservative	Susan Elizabeth Martin	418		
English Democrat	Dianne Settle	177		
Turnout		3,222		
Labour hold		Swing		
Labour hold		Swing		

Sutton-at-Hone and Hawley (2)
Party	Candidate	Votes	%	±%
Conservative	Pat Coleman	815		
Conservative	Tony Martin	664		
English Democrat	Steven Uncles	224		
Labour	Kenneth Ronald Nicholls	220		
Labour	Carole Jones	386		
Peace	Geoffrey Peter Pay	78		
Turnout		2,200		
Conservative hold		Swing		

Swanscombe (3)
Party	Candidate	Votes	%	±%
Residents	Bryan Read	946		
Residents	Les Bobby	897		
Residents	John Hayes	879		
Labour	Julian Timothy Bryant	265		
Labour	Jacqueline Goldstein	246		
Labour	Graham Christopher David Steele	223		
Turnout		3,456		
Residents hold		Swing		
Residents hold		Swing		

Town (2)
Party	Candidate	Votes	%	±%
Conservative	Matthew John Davis	391		
Conservative	Christopher Jon Shippam	352		
Labour	Trevor Alan Rogers	288		
Labour	Ram Appadoo	263		
English Democrat	Mitchell Jackson	148		
English Democrat	Teresa Cannon	142		
UKIP	Arnold Edwin Tarling	59		
Turnout		1,643		
Conservative gain from Labour		Swing		
Conservative gain from Labour		Swing		

West Hill (3)
Party	Candidate	Votes	%	±%
Labour	Deborah Jane Stoate	832		
Conservative	Anthony Wells	825		
Conservative	Jan Michael Ozog	768		
Labour	Patrick Kelly	754		
Labour	Santha Kumari Blankley	704		
Conservative	Kapil Sangar	687		
English Democrat	Jo Shippam	378		
English Democrat	Caroline Starling	352		
English Democrat	Tony Wilson	343		
Turnout		5,643		
Labour hold		Swing		
Conservative gain from Labour		Swing		
Conservative gain from Labour		Swing		

Wilmington (2)
Party	Candidate	Votes	%	±%
Conservative	Derek Edward Hunnisett	1008		
Conservative	Eddy Lampkin	906		
Labour	John Kingston	310		
Labour	Mally May	285		
English Democrat	Louise Uncles	229		
Turnout		2,738		
Conservative hold		Swing		
