= 2011 Dartford Borough Council election =

2011 UK local government election

Results of the 2011 Dartford Borough Council election

The 2011 Dartford Borough Council Election to the Dartford Borough Council was held on 5 May 2011. The whole council (44 seats) was up for election and the Conservative Party retained overall control of the council.

The Conservatives won seats from both the Labour Party and the Swanscombe and Greenhithe Residents Association, as well as retaining all their gains at the previous election.

== Election result ==
"Residents Association" is the Swanscombe and Greenhithe Residents Association.

Turnout: 41.21%

Dartford Borough Council Election Result 5 May 2011
Party	Seats	Gains	Losses	Net gain/loss	Seats %	Votes %	Votes	+/−
Conservative	31	5	-	+5	70	52.87	37,819	
Labour	9	-	3	-3	20	31.20	22,122	
Residents	4	-	2	-2	9	6.62	4690	
English Democrat	0	-	-	-		6.25	4615	
UKIP	0	-	-	-		<1	392	
Green	0	-	-	-		<1	316	
Independent	0	-	-	-		<1	287	
Liberal Democrats	0	-	-	-		<1	159	

== Ward results ==
In multi-member wards, "majority" is taken as the difference in votes between the lowest of the elected and the highest of the not elected.

Bean & Darenth (3)
Party	Candidate	Votes	%	±%
Conservative	Ian Douglas Armitt	908	20.92	
Conservative	David Alan Hammock	886	20.41	
Conservative	Rebecca Louise Shanks	824	18.98	
Labour	Margaret Anne Eaton	416	9.58	
Labour	Alan William Pearson	362	8.34	
Labour	Sarah Wimhurst	358	8.25	
English Democrat	Stephen Richard Culliford	227	5.23	
English Democrat	Gary Paul Rogers	185	4.26	
English Democrat	Neil Charles Tibby	175	4.03	
Majority		408		
Turnout		4341	38.49	
Conservative hold		Swing		
Conservative hold		Swing		
Conservative hold		Swing		

Brent (3)
Party	Candidate	Votes	%	±%
Conservative	Nancy Catherine Wightman	1152	18.93	
Conservative	Drew Swinerd	1129	18.55	
Conservative	Peter John Cannon	1115	18.32	
Labour	Julian Timothy Bryant	779	12.80	
Labour	Raghvir Singh Athwal	638	10.48	
Labour	Christian Arthur Nicholson	616	10.12	
English Democrat	Michael Terrence Tibby	252	4.14	
English Democrat	Jeremy Richard Chattenton	211	3.47	
English Democrat	Mitchell Roy Jackson	193	3.17	
Majority				
Turnout		6085	44.80	
Conservative hold		Swing		
Conservative hold		Swing		
Conservative hold		Swing		

Castle (1)
Party	Candidate	Votes	%	±%
Conservative	Sheila East	337	56.35	
Labour	Dharma Ramdass Appadoo	122	20.40	
Residents	Richard John Lees	83	13.88	
English Democrat	Frances Elizabeth Moore	56	9.36	
Majority		215		
Turnout		598	32.20	
Conservative hold		Swing		

Greenhithe (3)
Party	Candidate	Votes	%	±%
Residents	Susan Patricia Butterfill	572	14.06	
Conservative	Keith Martin Kelly	550	13.52	
Conservative	David James Mote	537	13.20	
Residents	Peter Martin Harman	501	12.32	
Conservative	Victoria Louise Morris	478	11.75	
Residents	Victor Openshaw	467	11.48	
Labour	John Wallace Masson	295	7.25	
Labour	Monica Lesley Masson	289	7.11	
Labour	Joyce Wise	287	7.06	
English Democrat	Dianne Cooper	91	2.24	
Majority				
Turnout		4067	32.39	
Residents hold		Swing		
Conservative gain from Residents		Swing		
Conservative gain from Residents		Swing		

Heath (3)
Party	Candidate	Votes	%	±%
Conservative	Andrew Ronald Lloyd	1501	24.13	
Conservative	Patricia Anne Thurlow	1401	22.52	
Conservative	Richard John Wells	1365	21.95	
Labour	Rosetta Mary Barnett	591	9.50	
Labour	David John Michael Stock	560	9.00	
Labour	Robert John Celino	534	8.59	
English Democrat	Carol White-Griffiths	268	4.31	
Majority				
Turnout		6220	48.24	
Conservative hold		Swing		
Conservative hold		Swing		
Conservative hold		Swing		

Joyce Green (2)
Party	Candidate	Votes	%	±%
Labour	Ann Muckle	543	28.85	
Labour	Matthew James Bryant	512	27.21	
Conservative	Scott David Shewbridge	281	14.93	
Conservative	Terence Jonathan White	211	11.21	
English Democrat	Glenn Gardner	176	9.35	
Liberal Democrats	William Simmonds	91	4.84	
Liberal Democrats	George Sakellariou	68	3.61	
Turnout		1882	34.26	
Labour hold		Swing		
Labour hold		Swing		

Joydens Wood (3)
Party	Candidate	Votes	%	±%
Conservative	Ann Dorothy Allen	1766	25.57	
Conservative	Marilyn Iris Peters	1717	24.86	
Conservative	Jennifer Ann Rickwood	1661	24.05	
Labour	Paul Frederick Blankley	515	7.46	
Labour	Susan May Brooker	515	7.46	
Labour	Michael John Allen	501	7.25	
English Democrat	Laurence Williams	232	3.36	
Turnout		6907	47.03	
Conservative hold		Swing		
Conservative hold		Swing		
Conservative hold		Swing		

Littlebrook (2)
Party	Candidate	Votes	%	±%
Labour	John Ivan Muckle	585	32.43	
Labour	Thomas Anthony Maddison	504	27.94	
Conservative	Julie Anne Ozog	256	14.19	
Conservative	Ragbhir Singh Sandhu	233	12.92	
English Democrat	Paul Anthony Wells	226	12.53	
Turnout		1804	35.78	
Labour hold		Swing		
Labour hold		Swing		

Longfield, New Barn and Southfleet (3)
Party	Candidate	Votes	%	±%
Conservative	Jeremy Alan Kite	1828	25.12	
Conservative	Steven Hamilton Brown	1747	24.01	
Conservative	Roger Perfitt	1562	21.46	
Independent	Jennifer Mary MacDonald	493	6.77	
Labour				
Labour	Catherine Mary Stafford	449	6.17	
Labour	Maureen Anna Jansseune	378	5.19	
Labour	John Roger Ward	323	4.44	
Green	Christopher John Burton	316	4.34	
UKIP	Sanya-Jeet Thandi	181	2.49	
Turnout		7277	53.05	
Conservative hold		Swing		
Conservative hold		Swing		
Conservative hold		Swing		

Newtown (3)
Party	Candidate	Votes	%	±%
Conservative	Gary Reynolds	951	16.56	
Conservative	Avtar Singh Sandhu	938	16.33	
Conservative	Michael John Street	898	15.63	
Labour	David John Baker	842	14.66	
Labour	Helen Mary Susan Flint	733	12.76	
Labour	Gurdial Singh Rai	679	11.82	
English Democrat	Daryl Saines	265	4.61	
English Democrat	James Thomas Read	225	3.92	
English Democrat	Louise Ann Uncles	213	3.71	
Turnout		5744	42.17	
Conservative hold		Swing		
Conservative hold		Swing		
Conservative gain from Labour		Swing		

Princes (3)
Party	Candidate	Votes	%	±%
Labour	Rosemary Bryant	811	19.87	
Labour	Patrick Kelly	728	17.83	
Labour	Geoffrey Truscott Prout	684	16.76	
Conservative	Rebecca Florence Storey	536	13.13	
Conservative	Jean Carol Shippam	529	12.96	
Conservative	Steven Ronald Jarnell	526	12.89	
English Democrat	Christine Lorraine Dunmall	268	6.57	
Turnout		4082	36.57	
Labour hold		Swing		
Labour hold		Swing		
Labour hold		Swing		

Stone (3)
Party	Candidate	Votes	%	±%
Conservative	John Burrell	713	18.53	
Labour	John Paul Adams	642	16.68	
Labour	Jonathon Simon Hawkes	609	15.83	
Conservative	Madeleine Barbara Phyllis Rogers	588	15.28	
Labour	Iqbal Badwal	560	14.55	
Conservative	Brian Walter Wells	544	14.14	
English Democrat	Paul David Cooper	192	4.99	
Turnout		3848	33.89	
Conservative gain from Labour		Swing		
Labour hold		Swing		
Labour hold		Swing		

Sutton-at-Hone and Hawley (2)
Party	Candidate	Votes	%	±%
Conservative	Patrick Francis Coleman	960	36.82	
Conservative	Anthony Robert Martin	817	31.34	
Labour	Stephen Robert David de Winton	371	14.23	
Labour	Samantha Kirsty Fallick	322	12.35	
English Democrat	Christopher Henry Bousfield	137	5.26	
Turnout		2607	45.18	
Conservative hold		Swing		
Conservative hold		Swing		

Swanscombe (3)
Party	Candidate	Votes	%	±%
Residents	Bryan Ernest Read	1063	24.82	
Residents	Leslie James Bobby	1011	23.61	
Residents	John Alfred Hayes	993	23.19	
Labour	Anne Elizabeth Burke	359	8.38	
Labour	David Edward May	342	7.99	
Labour	Marilyn Sharon May	303	7.08	
UKIP	Stephen Wilders	211	4.93	
Turnout		4282	32.96	
Residents hold		Swing		
Residents hold		Swing		
Residents hold		Swing		

Town (2)
Party	Candidate	Votes	%	±%
Conservative	Matthew John Davis	533	25.66	
Conservative	Christopher Jon Shippam	495	23.83	
Labour	Carole Ann Jones	391	18.83	
Labour	Ian Alexander Kettley	354	17.04	
English Democrat	Nathan Andrew (Potton) King	129	6.21	
English Democrat	Andrew Richard Charles Waghorn	106	5.10	
	Ashley Brown	43	2.07	
	Hasan Nurhakli	26	1.25	
Turnout		2077	37.55	
Conservative hold		Swing		
Conservative hold		Swing		

West Hill (3)
Party	Candidate	Votes	%	±%
Conservative	Arron Bardoe	1145	18.22	
Conservative	Anthony Wells	1142	18.17	
Conservative	Jan Michael Ozog	1028	16.35	
Labour	Christine Angell	756	12.03	
Labour	Garry Graham Sturley	666	10.59	
Labour	Samuel Taiwo-Brown	660	10.50	
English Democrat	John Henry Griffiths	258	4.10	
English Democrat	Michelle Laura Duncan	225	3.58	
Independent	Josephine Anne Shippam	218	3.47	
English Democrat	Steven Thomas Uncles	188	2.99	
Turnout		6286	47.08	
Conservative hold		Swing		
Conservative hold		Swing		
Conservative gain from Labour		Swing		

Wilmington (2)
Party	Candidate	Votes	%	±%
Conservative	Derek Edward Hunnisett	1071	38.44	
Conservative	Edward John Lampkin	960	34.46	
Labour	Derek Alexander Hills	322	11.56	
Labour	Graham Christopher David Steele	316	11.34	
English Democrat	Teresa Cannon	117	4.20	
Turnout		2786	47.34	
Conservative hold		Swing		
Conservative hold		Swing		
