= Bob Dunn (politician) =

British politician

Robert John Dunn (14 July 1946 – 24 April 2003), known as Bob Dunn, was a British Conservative Party politician.

== Early life ==
From 1957 to 1962 Dunn attended his local secondary modern school, Cromwell Road Secondary Modern School for Boys, a classmate of Allan Chapman, lecturer and tutor at Oxford University, and occasional TV presenter.

Having been involved in the Conservative Party in his home-constituency of Eccles, near Manchester, Dunn was elected a councillor in the London Borough of Southwark in May 1974. His hometown was Swinton (previously in the Borough of Swinton and Pendlebury), Lancashire, 5 miles up the A6 road to the north-west of Manchester city centre.

== Parliamentary career ==
Dunn stood unsuccessfully for Parliament for Eccles in both February and October 1974, being beaten by Labour's Lewis Carter-Jones on each occasion.

He was member of parliament (MP) for Dartford from 1979 to 1997 and was a junior education minister from 1983 to 1988. He proposed the Loyal Address in the 1994 Queen's Speech debate.

Dunn lost his seat to Labour's Howard Stoate at the 1997 general election. He unsuccessfully contested the seat again at the 2001 election, and served as a borough councillor in Dartford until his death in 2003 aged 56.

== Legacy ==
Bob Dunn Way was named in his memory during 2004, this being a northern by-pass of Dartford, for which he had campaigned, previously known as University Way in the expectation of a higher education campus being built. When the former Naval College at Greenwich became available to the University of Greenwich, its need for a campus north of Dartford disappeared.

Parliament of the United Kingdom
Preceded by Sydney Irving	Member of Parliament for Dartford; 1979–1997	Succeeded by Howard Stoate
