= English Democrats =

Political party in England

- Chairman: Robin Tilbrook
- Founded: 2002; 24 years ago
- Headquarters: Quires Green; Ongar, Essex, CM5 0QP
- Youth wing: Young English Democrats
- Membership (2015): 2,500
- Ideology: English nationalism; English parliamentary devolution; Hard Euroscepticism; Anti-immigration
- Political position: Far-right
- National affiliation: Patriots Alliance - English Democrats and UKIP; Alliance for Democracy (2010)
- Colours: Red and white

Website
- englishdemocrats.party

The English Democrats are a far-right, English nationalist political party active in England. A minor party, it currently has no elected representatives at any level of government.

The English Democrats were established in 2002 by members of the Campaign for an English Parliament pressure group. Following growing political devolution in the United Kingdom, which had seen the creation of the Scottish Parliament, Welsh Parliament and Northern Ireland Assembly, the party's founders called for a separate English Parliament. In the 2000s, it obtained a small number of local councillors. In 2009, the party's candidate, Peter Davies, was elected Mayor of the Metropolitan Borough of Doncaster, although he left the party in 2013 in protest at its admittance of former members of the fascist British National Party (BNP). As well as attracting many ex-BNP members, who then constituted a sizeable percentage of the English Democrats' electoral candidates, in 2015 the political party Veritas merged into it.

Ideologically committed to English nationalism, the party previously called for England to become an independent state, thus leaving the United Kingdom. Since 2016, it has instead called only for the creation of a devolved English Parliament within a federal UK. It has also called for a referendum on whether Monmouthshire, a county presently recognised as being in Wales, should instead be classified as part of England. The party is Eurosceptic and endorsed Brexit.

== History ==
In 1998, in response to calls for the devolution of power to Scotland and Wales, Robin Tilbrook aimed at reforming the English National Party, which had ceased operating in 1981. This project included members of the Campaign for an English Parliament, a pressure group that lobbies for a devolved English Parliament. The party was relaunched as the "English Democrats" in September 2002, after merging with several other smaller political parties. In October 2004 the party merged with the Reform UK Party, which was a small splinter group from the United Kingdom Independence Party (UKIP). The New England Party merged with the English Democrats in February 2007.

The English Democrats were co-founders of the English Constitutional Convention, now defunct.

In December 2004, it was rumoured that Robert Kilroy-Silk, the former UKIP MEP had entered into negotiation to join the English Democrats. However, Kilroy-Silk formed Veritas instead.

In 2007, the columnist and conspiracy theorist Vernon Coleman announced he had joined the English Democrats.

The party's most significant electoral success came when Peter Davies (a former UKIP and Reform UK member), its candidate for Mayor of Doncaster, was elected. Having received 16,961 votes in the first round, 189 votes behind the independent Michael Maye, Davies was returned in the second count on transfers of second preference votes, with 25,344 votes to 24,990. However, Davies announced his resignation from the party on 5 February 2013 citing "a big influx of new members joining from the British National Party". One of its councillors, Mick Glynn, resigned the following day after the party's chairman, Tilbrook, launched a personal attack on Davies, thus reducing its number of elected representatives to two. The English Democrats lost their remaining councillors in the 2015 local elections. On 18 September 2015, Veritas merged into the English Democrats. Of the party officers, only the party leader, Therese Muchewizc, joined the English Democrats filling the roles of Deputy Chairman and National Council Member, the remaining officers refusing to do so due to differences in policy beliefs.

The party claimed a total membership of 1,011 at the end of 2004, and 1,202 at the end of 2005.

In 2015, the party lost the vast majority of its general election minimum 5% of poll deposits, had a few councillors elected and gained some by defection and was regarded by some as a fringe party.

== Leaders ==
Image	Name	Time in office	Deputy leader/s
	Robin Tilbrook	17 September 2002 – present	None

== Election performances and campaigns ==
The first person to stand as a candidate for the English Democrats was Gary Cowd, who stood in West Heath Ward, Rushmoor, in North Hampshire in a council by-election in May 2003. Cowd was an active member of the English Democrats and a National Council member. He left the party in 2006.

=== House of Commons ===
Election	Leader	Candidates	Votes (England)		Seats (England)		Position	
Election	Leader	Candidates	#	%	#	±	(England)	(United Kingdom)
2005	Robin Tilbrook	25	15,149	0.06%	0 / 529	Steady	11th	23rd
2010	Robin Tilbrook	107	64,826	0.25%	0 / 533	Steady	7th	13th
2015	Robin Tilbrook	32	6,531	0.02%	0 / 533	Steady	11th	24th
2017	Robin Tilbrook	7	1,913	0.01%	0 / 533	Steady	13th	29th
2019	Robin Tilbrook	5	1,987	0.01%	0 / 533	Steady	14th	31st
2024	Robin Tilbrook	15	5,182	0.02%	0 / 533	Steady	17th	35th

=== Parliamentary elections ===
At the 2004 Birmingham Hodge Hill by-election the English Democrat candidate received 277 votes, or 1.4% of the votes cast.

The party's slogan for the 2005 general election was "The English Democrats – Putting England First!" In total, the English Democrats fielded 25 candidates for the May 2005 general election, including Staffordshire South where the election was delayed until June due to the death of a candidate. The party withdrew its candidate in North Norfolk and endorsed the Conservative Party candidate, Iain Dale, as he had "taken the issues of English discrimination seriously".

Garry Bushell, the former Sun journalist and current Daily Star Sunday TV critic, became the most high-profile candidate for the English Democrats, standing in the Greenwich and Woolwich constituency in London. Bushell's 1,216 votes (3.4%) beat the UKIP candidate, Stan Gain, who secured 709 votes (2.0%); this was the party's best result for the election though still a fifth-place performance.

In June 2005, Bushell also stood in Staffordshire South, where he received 643 votes (2.5%) coming fifth out of eight candidates. In 2011, Bushell announced that he would, in future, be supporting UKIP.

The English Democrats fielded Joanne Robinson as their candidate in the by-election forced by the resignation of former shadow home secretary David Davis from the House of Commons. Because of the issues raised by David Davis in the by-election, many parties other than the Conservatives, such as Labour, Liberal Democrats, United Kingdom Independence Party (UKIP) and British National Party (BNP) chose not to stand. Joanne Robinson came third, with 1,714 votes (7.2%), 44 votes fewer than the Green candidate received in second place. Of the 26 candidates she was one of only three to win back her deposit. This result is both the highest place gained and the highest percentage of the votes won by any English Democrat candidate in a parliamentary election or parliamentary by-election.

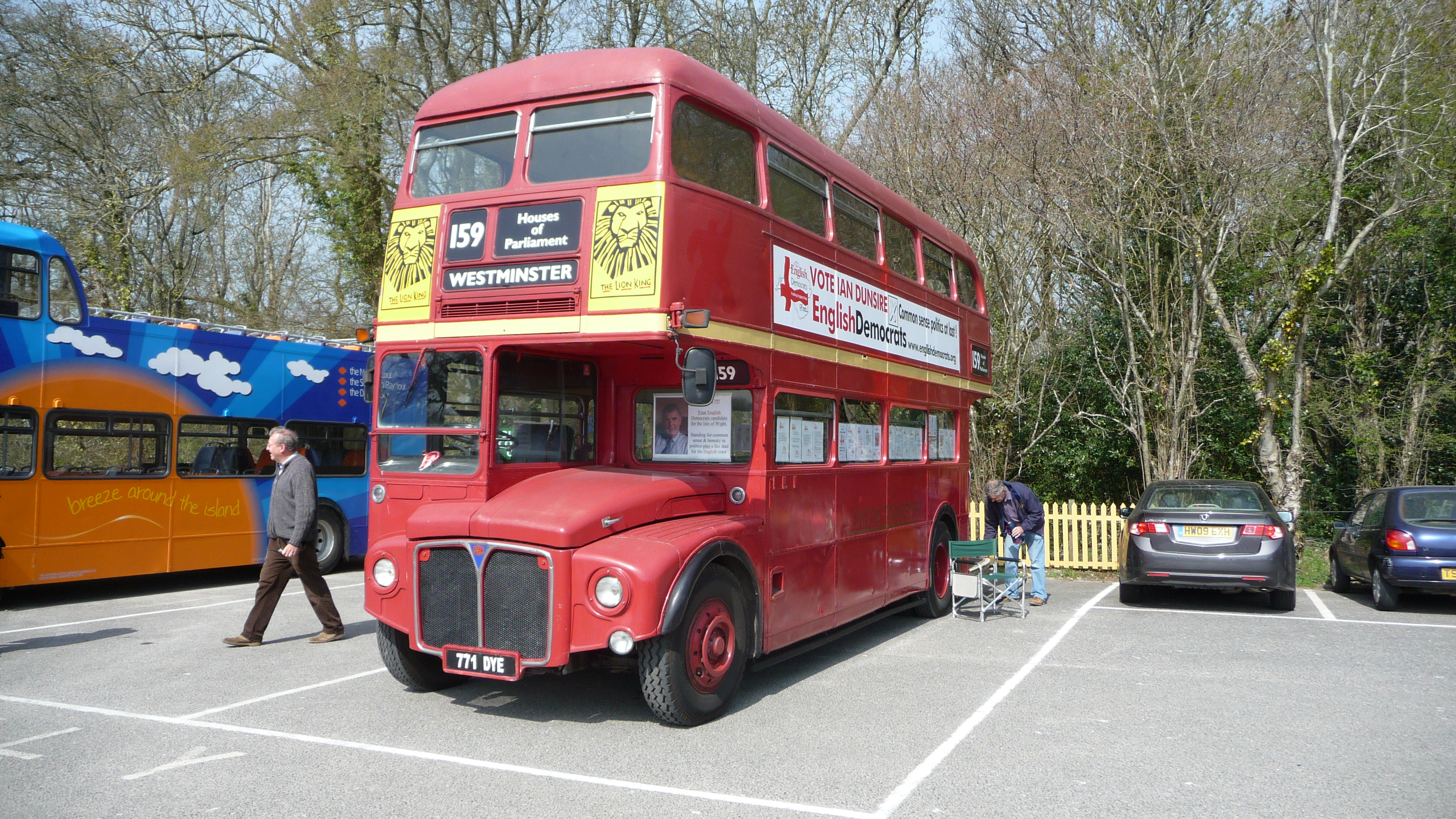
Campaign bus during the 2010 general election

The English Democrats stood 107 candidates in the 2010 general election. 106 is the minimum number required to qualify for a Party Election Broadcast. The English Democrats received 64,826 votes, or 0.3% of the vote in England, and 0.2% of the vote in the United Kingdom. No candidates were elected but the party saved one deposit in the Doncaster North constituency, where candidate Wayne Crawshaw picked up 5.2% of the vote.

In subsequent by-elections, the party contested Oldham East and Saddleworth (where Stephen Morris polled 144 (0.4%)), Barnsley Central (Kevin Riddiough polled 544 (2.2%) votes), Feltham and Heston (Roger Cooper polled 322 (1.4%)), Corby (David Wickham polled 432 (1.2%) votes) and Rotherham (David Wildgoose polled 703 (3.3%) votes).

At the 2015 general election, the party contested 32 seats, securing a total of 6,531 votes (0.02%).

In the 2016 Batley and Spen by-election, the English Democrats received 4.8% of the votes, coming second to Labour's Tracy Brabin, when all of the other major parties did not stand out of respect for the murdered MP, Jo Cox.

=== European Parliament elections ===
==== 2004 ====
The English Democrats stood candidates for the 2004 European Parliament election in five of the nine regions of England. The party's 2004 election canvassing leaflet featured the slogan, "Not left, not right, just English". Its candidates received 130,056 votes in total.

==== 2009 ====
In June 2009, the English Democrats contested elections to the European Parliament. The party fielded a full slate of candidates across the nine English European parliament constituencies. On 18 May 2009, the English Democrats broadcast their first national Party Election Broadcast. They came seventh in the election in England (ninth in the UK as a whole) with 279,801 votes or 1.8%, a rise from the 0.7% they received at the previous elections in 2004. The English Democrats do not stand in Northern Ireland, Scotland or Wales, and their vote across England in 2009 was 2.1%, an increase of 1.3% yet still did not keep their deposits except in Yorkshire and the Humber where they gained 2.6% of the vote. None of the English Democrats candidates were elected; the English Democrats were the highest-polling party across the UK not to have an MEP elected.

==== 2014 ====
The English Democrats began their 2014 EU election campaign in September 2013 with an extensive social media campaign. On 30 April 2014, they held a rally at Fobbing in Essex, the site of the 1381 Peasants' Revolt, and declared, "let the English revolt begin." The party fielded a full slate of candidates across the nine English European parliament constituencies on 22 May 2014. On 13 February 2014, party chairman Robin Tilbrook appeared on the BBC Daily Politics with Nicola Sturgeon, the deputy leader of the Scottish National Party. The English Democrats performed poorly at the election, taking just 0.8% of the votes, down more than 1% on 2009. They again failed to win any seats.

==== 2019 ====
In May 2019, the English Democrats took part in the elections to the European Parliament, fielding candidates in only four out of nine English constituencies: East of England, North West England, South West England, and Yorkshire and the Humber. In total they received 39,938 votes, 0.2% of the 17,199,701 valid votes cast, being around 10,000 in each of the constituencies they contested. They again failed to win any seats.

=== Local councils ===
In November 2005, the party achieved its first electoral success when Paul Adams was elected to Crowborough Town Council, polling 120 votes, or 56.8% of the poll, on a turnout of 10%.

In the 2007 local elections, 78 candidates stood for election in boroughs and districts in 15 English counties, including 20 in Dartford and ten in Portsmouth. All were unsuccessful.

In 2008, the party fielded candidates in 12 district council elections. None was elected. The party's best results were when it came second to the Conservatives: in the Finningley ward of Doncaster and in three wards in Rochford.

In the 2009 English local elections, the party fielded 84 county council and local authority candidates, with a particular focus in Bristol, Essex, Hampshire, Kent, Northamptonshire, Nottinghamshire, Wiltshire and Lancashire. The party had an unexpected success when Peter Davies, its candidate for Mayor of Doncaster, was elected. Having received 16,961 votes in the first round, 189 votes behind the independent Michael Maye, Davies was returned in the second count on transfers of second preference votes, with 25,344 votes to 24,990.

In 2010, the party also stood in the local elections on 6 May, but did not publish a list of candidates. The two sitting English Democrat councillors on Calderdale and Blackburn with Darwen councils retired, and the party did not nominate any candidates to contest the seats.

In 2011, the EDP stood about 130 candidates in district level elections; two were elected. The Boston Borough Council elections on 5 May 2011, saw the election of the first two EDP councillors. David Owens and Elliott Fountain were elected in the Fenside Ward for a four-year term, thus becoming the only EDP members of a district council to be elected by public vote. A sitting EDP councillor on Peterborough council lost his seat.

The party fielded a candidate in the 3 March 2011 local by-election for the Walkden North ward of Salford City Council. Its candidate, Laurence Depares, polled 125 votes (7%) and came third, ahead of the British National Party and Liberal Democrats; in a by-election in the same city's Swinton South ward on 7 January 2014 the party was fifth with 54 votes (3.7%).

In 2012, the party fielded 101 candidates in the local elections in England, including district council elections, mayoral contests and elections to the Greater London Assembly. None was elected, and the party suffered the loss of the two seats it was defending, one that it had gained from a former BNP member who had defected to the party and another from an ex-Tory. The English Democrats has come under fire from the anti-fascist groups Unite Against Fascism and Hope not Hate and from the trades unions NASUWT and Unite the Union over the number of former BNP members standing for election for the party. 43% of English Democrats candidates in the 2012 local elections were former BNP members.

The EDP contested the mayoral elections in Liverpool and Salford. In Liverpool, its candidate received 1.42% of the vote, finishing in ninth place, and in Salford 3.6% finishing in eighth place. The party chairman, Robin Tilbrook, declared that he was standing for Mayor of London and asked for donations through one of the party's websites but his name did not appear on the ballot paper.

=== Welsh Assembly ===
In 2007, in line with the English Democrats stance on the status of Monmouthshire, 13 English Democrat candidates contested the Welsh Assembly elections in the South East Wales region, and the constituencies of Monmouth (fifth with 2.7%), Newport East (sixth, 2.2%) and Newport West (fifth, 2.7%). The party also received 0.9% of the vote on the regional list.

The party contested the 2016 Welsh Assembly election in Monmouth. Its candidate, Stephen Morris, received 146 votes, 0.5% of the votes cast.

=== London mayoral elections ===
In July 2007, Garry Bushell was nominated as the English Democrats' mayoral candidate for the 2008 London mayoral and Assembly elections with the campaign slogan "Serious About London". In January 2008, he stepped down as candidate because of work commitments and Matt O'Connor, the founder of Fathers 4 Justice, was selected by the English Democrats in his place with his campaign expected to start on 14 February. His campaign web site was launched on 31 January 2008. A party political broadcast for O'Connor's campaign was broadcast on 11 April.

One week before the election, on 25 April, O'Connor told Vanessa Feltz and the BBC that he was dropping out of the Mayoral race, giving as his reasons the lack of support within the English Democrats on St George's Day and a lack of press coverage as well as the party's co-operation with the far-right group England First. The English Democrats released a press statement on their website in response to his resignation voicing disappointment at his decision to quit the contest. O'Connor received 10,695 first preference votes (representing 0.44% of the votes cast) in the mayoral contest, ranking ninth out of ten candidates; he received 73,538 second preference votes (3.67%), ranking eighth.

In December 2015, Winston McKenzie announced that he had joined the English Democrats, along with confirmation that he had been selected as a London Mayoral Candidate for the 2016 London Elections. His nomination was deemed invalid and he did not contest the mayoral election.

=== Police commissioners ===
==== 2012 ====
English Democrats contested five of the 41 of the Police and Crime Commissioner elections in November 2012. Results were:

Police force	Candidate	1st round votes	%	Posn/no. cands
Cambridgeshire Constabulary	Stephen Goldspink	7,219	8.1%	6 out of 7
Essex Police	Robin Tilbrook	11,550	6.87%	6 out of 6
Kent Police	Steven Uncles	10,789	5.3%	5 out of 6
Merseyside Police	Paul Rimmer	7,142	5.7%	6 out of 6
South Yorkshire Police	David Allen	22,608	15.6%	2 out of 5

==== 2014 ====
David Allen also contested the South Yorkshire Police and Crime Commissioner by-election in October 2014.

Police force	Candidate	1st round votes	%	Posn/no. cands
South Yorkshire Police	David Allen	8,583	5.8%	4 out of 4

==== 2021 ====
The English Democrats contested two of the 39 of the 2021 England and Wales police and crime commissioner elections. Results were:

Police force	Candidate	1st round votes	%	Posn/no. cands
Bedfordshire Police	Antonio Daniel Vitiello	3,387	2.8%	5 out of 5
Essex Police	Robin Tilbrook	42,831	9.8%	4 out of 4

== Members holding local government seats ==
In November 2005, Paul Adams became the first elected English Democrats councillor at parish level for Crowborough Town Council in East Sussex, polling 120 votes of 211 cast; he was returned in 2007 in an uncontested election. In 2011, he was elected as an independent, so the English Democrats lost the seat. Later that year, Markyate Parish councillor Simon Deacon defected from the British National Party, to the English Democrats, having been elected unopposed. However, he resigned in October 2012. The English Democrats gained another parish council seat when Mick Glynn was elected for the Dunsville ward of Hatfield Town Council, Doncaster. Following the resignation of Peter Davies, Glynn resigned his seat and membership of the party in February 2013.

The party had two district councillors elected (the first above parish level) in the 2011 local elections and obtained a further county council seat through the defection of a BNP, later "Independent Nationalist", councillor in Hertfordshire. However, the county councillor did not defend the seat in the May 2013 election, nor did the EDP put forward another candidate, losing them the seat. The EDP lost one of its district councillors, Elliott Fountain, on 25 July 2013 after he failed to attend any meetings in six months. Following the 2015 local elections, the English Democrats have no representation on any local authorities.

== Electoral fraud ==
In March 2017, Steven Uncles, the former regional chairman and candidate for the Kent Police and Crime Commissioner election, was imprisoned for seven months after he had completed County Council nomination forms using fake names such as "Anna Cleves" and "Rachelle Stevens", or real people who had not signed the relevant forms. He was subsequently expelled from the party for bringing it into disrepute.

== Party policies ==
It presents itself as an English equivalent to the Scottish National Party (SNP), although the SNP is generally considered to be a centre-left party whereas the English Democrats are on the right of the political spectrum. The English Democrats have accepted defectors from the far-right British National Party (BNP) into leadership roles and some former members of the party have criticised informal links with other far-right organisations, although party leader Robin Tilbrook has stated that party members are expected to pledge their opposition to racism.

=== An English Parliament, but no longer independence ===
The English Democrat leader frequently changes the party's constitutional offering. Since 2016, they propose creating a unified, devolved English parliament, within a federal UK, not an independent sovereign state. An English executive and first minister with the same powers as Scottish ones, and a reformed second chamber at Westminster. It proposes fiscal devolution so that the English, Scottish, Welsh and Northern Irish parliaments become responsible for financing their own expenditure.

In 2006, the party rejected suggestions that non-English MPs in the House of Commons should be barred from voting on England-specific matters, on the basis that this would lead to there being, in effect, two parliaments in the same building and that this would be problematic.

From March 2014 to the 2015 general election, the party chairman, Robin Tilbrook, had suggested England should become an independent country. Temporarily rekindling its roots, his 2015 general election campaign launch was moved on from Traitors Gate (Tower of London), to the nearby Hung, Drawn and Quartered pub. Tilbrook accused various political parties of being traitors to the English (Labour, the Scottish National Party, Plaid Cymru and Sinn Féin), and the United Kingdom Independence Party "have no interest in England whatsoever". He said the party was "consolidating our position as the English nationalist party".

=== Immigration ===
In the party's 2019 general election manifesto, alongside campaigning for an independent England with an English parliament and English prime minister, the party also stated that immigration would come under the control of an English parliament. The party called for a points-style system based upon the Canadian and Australian models, and called for a withdrawal from the 1951 Refugee Convention.

=== Traditional counties ===
The party is supportive of historic counties. It has called for a referendum on whether Monmouthshire should be part of England rather than Wales.

It contested the constituency of Monmouth in the 2015 general election, receiving 100 votes (0.2% of votes cast).

== Nationalist connections ==
On 17 November 2011, the chairman of the English Democrats, Robin Tilbrook, met Sergey Yerzunov, a member of the executive committee of the Russian right-wing group Russky Obraz. Shortly afterwards, Obraz announced that it was in alliance with the English Democrats. Other members of this alliance include the Serbian Obraz, 1389 Movement, Golden Dawn, Danes' Party, Slovenska Pospolitost, Workers' Party and Noua Dreaptă.

According to the advocacy group Hope not Hate, a number of former members of the BNP joined the party in 2011. Tilbrook was quoted as saying, of ex-BNP supporters, "They will help us become an electorally credible party. We need to be sure they ascribe to civic or cultural nationalism and that they will be an asset to our party, but we do not need to be too defensive." In an April 2013 interview, Tilbrook said that about 200–300 of the party's membership of 3,000 were former BNP members. He said it was "perfectly fair" that such people would "change their minds" and join a "moderate, sensible English nationalist party".

=== New England Party ===
The New England Party was a local party in Dartford from March 2003 to February 2007, when it merged with the English Democrats. Its leader, nominating officer and treasurer was Michael Tibby while Sheila Tibby was its campaigns officer.

Michael Tibby and Austen Brooker were councillors on Dartford Borough Council between 2003 and 2007, representing Littlebrook and Newtown. Tibby came second in Littlebrook in the 2003 local elections, while Brooker was elected as one of three Labour councillors for Newtown, but left Labour soon after his election in May 2003, initially as an independent. Brooker stood down at the 2007 local elections and Tibby was unsuccessful in seeking re-election for the English Democrats, coming third.

Michael Tibby contested Dartford at the 2005 general election, receiving 1,224 votes (the elected Labour MP, Howard Stoate, received 19,909 votes). The party contested the Dartford Borough Council Heath ward by-election on 27 July 2006, polling 174 votes (9.6%). The candidate was Steven Uncles, who had been the English Democrats candidate in the 2006 Bromley and Chislehurst by-election.

The New England Party merged with the English Democrats in February 2007.

=== Reform UK Party ===
Reform UK Party was a small UKIP splinter group of those opposing Nigel Farage, led by Harold Green from 2000 to 2004, when it merged with the English Democrats. Green received 357 votes (0.9%) in Reigate in the 2001 general election standing for Reform UK Party.

== See also ==
- Alliance for Democracy
- English Democrats Party election results
- Parliament of England
- West Lothian question
