= 2019 Dartford Borough Council election =

2019 local election in Dartford

- 2 May 2019

All 42 seats to Dartford Borough Council 22 seats needed for a majority
- Turnout: 30.68%
	First party	Second party	Third party
Leader	Jeremy Kite	Jonathon Hawkes	Sue Butterfill
Party	Conservative	Labour	Residents
Last election	34 seats, 49.7%	7 seats, 29.6%	3 seats, 4.3%
Seats won	29	10	3
Seat change	▼5	▲3	Steady
Popular vote	26,752	15,109	2,733
Percentage	52.8%	29.8%	5.4%
Swing	▲3.1%	▲0.2%	▲1.1%
- Results by ward of 2019 election. Conservatives in blue, Labour in red, Residents in white
council control before election
2015
Conservative
Subsequent council control
2019
Conservative

The 2019 Dartford Borough Council election took place on 2 May 2019 to elect members of the Dartford Borough Council in England. It was held on the same day as other local elections.

== Summary ==
=== Election result ===
2019 Dartford Borough Council election
Party	Candidates	Seats	Gains	Losses	Net gain/loss	Seats %	Votes %	Votes	+/−
Conservative	42	29	0	2	▼5	69.0	52.8	26,752	+3.1
Labour	42	10	3	0	▲3	23.8	29.8	15,109	+0.2
Residents	8	3	0	1	Steady	7.1	5.4	2,733	+1.1
UKIP	20	0	0	0	Steady	0.0	9.7	4,903	–4.6
Independent	2	0	0	0	Steady	0.0	1.6	791	N/A
Green	2	0	0	0	Steady	0.0	0.6	281	–1.4
Liberal Democrats	1	0	0	0	Steady	0.0	0.2	114	N/A

== Ward results ==
=== Bean & Village Park ===
Bean & Village Park
Party	Candidate	Votes	%
Conservative	David Hammock	471	81.5
Labour	Geoffrey Regan	107	18.5
Majority			
Turnout		591	29.9
Conservative win (new seat)			

=== Brent ===
Brent
Party	Candidate	Votes	%	±%
Conservative	Rosanna Currans	944	61.9	
Conservative	Avtar Sandhu	865	56.7	
Labour	Peter Grehan	346	22.7	
Labour	Eric Grover	320	21.0	
UKIP	Brenda Newton	197	12.9	
UKIP	Shan-E-Din Choycha	148	9.7	
Turnout		1,538	35.6	
Conservative hold				
Conservative hold				

=== Bridge ===
Bridge
Party	Candidate	Votes	%
Conservative	Dave Butler	385	62.3
Labour	Lisa Bullock	135	21.8
Green	Cintia Bailey	98	15.9
Majority			
Turnout		619	25.1
Conservative win (new seat)			

=== Burnham ===
Burnham
Party	Candidate	Votes	%
Conservative	Matthew Davis	341	51.0
Labour	Joe Yusuf	328	49.0
Majority			
Turnout		680	30.8
Conservative win (new seat)			

=== Darenth ===
Darenth
Party	Candidate	Votes	%
Conservative	Ian Armitt	268	47.4
Labour	Jeffrey Froud	179	31.6
UKIP	Ben Fryer	119	21.0
Majority			
Turnout		578	28.6
Conservative win (new seat)			

=== Ebbsfleet ===
Ebbsfleet
Party	Candidate	Votes	%
Labour	Sacha Gosine	188	39.6
Labour	Romana Gosine	183	38.6
Conservative	Danny Nicklen	179	37.8
Labour	Graham Steele	175	36.9
Residents	Nigel Hoad	138	29.1
Residents	Jason Clitherow	133	28.1
Conservative	Kyle Stealey	126	26.6
Conservative	Stephane Tindame	107	22.6
Residents	Ann Duke	106	22.4
Turnout		476	28.3
Labour win (new seat)			
Labour win (new seat)			
Conservative win (new seat)			

=== Greenhithe & Knockhall ===
Greenhithe & Knockhall
Party	Candidate	Votes	%
Residents	Sue Butterfill	538	43.8
Residents	Peter Harman	536	43.7
Conservative	David Mote	473	38.5
Residents	Jay Shah	406	33.1
Conservative	Keith Kelly	365	29.7
Conservative	Maria Kelly	343	28.0
Labour	Natalie Boorman	209	17.0
Labour	Timothy Cook	158	12.9
Labour	Michael Ankrah	157	12.8
UKIP	Frederick Hunt	134	10.9
Turnout		1,240	24.0
Residents win (new seat)			
Residents win (new seat)			
Conservative win (new seat)			

=== Heath ===
Heath
Party	Candidate	Votes	%	±%
Conservative	Andy Lloyd	959	63.4	
Conservative	Patsy Thurlow	846	55.9	
Labour	David Celino-Stock	353	23.3	
Labour	Robert Celino-Stock	343	22.7	
UKIP	Gary Rogers	251	16.6	
Turnout		1,528	34.6	
Conservative hold				
Conservative hold				

=== Joydens Wood ===
Joydens Wood
Party	Candidate	Votes	%	±%
Conservative	Marilyn Peters	1,151	74.2	
Conservative	Brian Garden	1,150	74.1	
UKIP	Rodney Janes	230	14.8	
Labour	Paul Blankley	197	12.7	
Labour	Mimi Marin	160	10.3	
Turnout		1,563	37.5	
Conservative hold				
Conservative hold				

=== Longfield, New Barn & Southfleet ===
Longfield, New Barn & Southfleet
Party	Candidate	Votes	%	±%
Conservative	Jeremy Kite	1,448	69.2	
Conservative	Steven Brown	1,382	66.1	
Conservative	Roger Perfitt	1,273	60.9	
Independent	Jennifer MacDonald	358	17.1	
UKIP	Donna Tibby	298	14.3	
Labour	Bill Cook	266	12.7	
Labour	Allan Fisher	248	11.9	
Labour	Andrew Prothero	230	11.0	
Turnout		2,104	37.7	
Conservative hold				
Conservative hold				
Conservative hold				

=== Maypole & Leyton Cross ===
Maypole & Leyton Cross
Party	Candidate	Votes	%
Conservative	Ann Allen	474	84.2
Labour	Ganesh Pala	89	15.8
Majority			
Turnout		577	26.7
Conservative win (new seat)			

=== Newtown ===
Newtown
Party	Candidate	Votes	%	±%
Labour	Laura Edie	610	42.2	
Labour	Adrian Oakley-Dow	568	39.3	
Conservative	Ellenor Palmer	522	36.1	
Conservative	Steve Parsons	489	33.8	
Green	Andrew Blatchford	183	12.6	
UKIP	Gordon Mayell	166	11.5	
Liberal Democrats	Kyle Marsh	114	7.9	
Turnout		1,454	35.2	
Labour gain from Conservative				
Labour gain from Conservative				

=== Princes ===
Princes
Party	Candidate	Votes	%	±%
Labour	Ricky Jones	552	44.1	
Conservative	Becky Storey	483	38.6	
Labour	Maria Perry	481	38.4	
Conservative	Sheun Oke	446	35.7	
UKIP	Jim Moore	259	20.7	
Turnout		1,268	31.5	
Labour hold				
Conservative hold				

=== Stone Castle ===
Stone Castle
Party	Candidate	Votes	%
Conservative	Lucy Canham	632	50.2
Conservative	John Burrell	594	47.2
Conservative	Paul Cutler	560	44.5
Labour	Rachael Martin-Smith	442	35.1
Labour	Mandy Garford	437	34.7
Labour	Catherine Stafford	357	28.4
UKIP	Roger Cockett	205	16.3
Turnout		1,272	24.2
Conservative win (new seat)			
Conservative win (new seat)			
Conservative win (new seat)			

=== Stone House ===
Stone House
Party	Candidate	Votes	%
Labour	Kelly Grehan	559	46.1
Conservative	Tom Oliver	518	42.7
Conservative	Steven Jarnell	487	40.2
Labour	Jonathon Hawkes	447	36.9
UKIP	Ryan Waters	186	15.3
Turnout		1,224	25.8
Labour win (new seat)			
Conservative win (new seat)			

=== Swanscombe ===
Swanscombe
Party	Candidate	Votes	%	±%
Labour	Emma-Louise Moussa	516	39.6	
Residents	Anita Barham	497	38.1	
Labour	Claire Pearce	418	32.1	
Residents	John Hayes	379	29.1	
UKIP	Linda Moore	224	17.2	
UKIP	Stephen Vaughan	200	15.3	
Conservative	Aaron Kelly	123	9.4	
Conservative	Thomas Shippam	83	6.4	
Turnout		1,313	28.4	
Labour gain from Residents		Swing		
Residents hold		Swing		

=== Temple Hill ===
Temple Hill
Party	Candidate	Votes	%
Labour	Tom Maddison	719	43.0
Labour	Alina Gaskin	702	41.9
Labour	Victoria Oguntope	669	40.0
Conservative	Anita Sillick	450	26.9
UKIP	Barry Taylor	426	25.4
Conservative	Tim Westwood	416	24.9
UKIP	Howard Bostridge	414	24.7
Conservative	Peter Whapshott	405	24.2
UKIP	David Martin-Garcia	401	24.0
Turnout		1,679	27.6
Labour win (new seat)			
Labour win (new seat)			
Labour win (new seat)			

=== Town ===
Town
Party	Candidate	Votes	%	±%
Conservative	Christopher Shippam	345	53.0	
Conservative	Richard Wells	331	50.8	
Labour	Lucy Robinson	243	37.3	
Labour	David Bull	234	35.9	
UKIP	Caroline Wakeman	56	8.6	
Turnout		654	27.0	
Conservative hold				
Conservative hold				

=== West Hill ===
West Hill
Party	Candidate	Votes	%	±%
Conservative	Julie Ozog	1,046	52.2	
Conservative	Denzil Raynolds	1,008	50.3	
Conservative	Drew Swinerd	947	47.3	
Labour	Ron Kipps	645	32.2	
Labour	Ruth Slight	619	30.9	
Labour	Mauro Orru	605	30.2	
UKIP	Michael Wiltshire	301	15.0	
UKIP	Jo Shippam	294	14.7	
Turnout		2,015	34.6	
Conservative hold				
Conservative hold				
Conservative hold				

=== Wilmington, Sutton-at-Hone & Hawley ===
Wilmington, Sutton-at-Hone & Hawley
Party	Candidate	Votes	%
Conservative	Derek Hunniset	1,184	60.1
Conservative	Calvin McLean	1,112	56.4
Conservative	Lucas Reynolds	1,021	51.8
Independent	Eddy Lampkin	433	22.0
UKIP	Ivan Burch	394	20.0
Labour	Shaun Cummings	314	15.9
Labour	Raymond Kelleher	307	15.6
Labour	Sid Bullock	294	14.9
Turnout		1,985	32.6
Conservative win (new seat)			
Conservative win (new seat)			
Conservative win (new seat)			

== Changes 2019–2023 ==
=== Affiliation and leadership changes ===
- In January 2021, Newtown councillor Laura Edie left the Labour Party to sit as an independent. She subsequently joined the Green Party.
- In April 2021, Swanscombe councillors Sue Butterfill and Anita Barham left the Swanscombe and Greenhithe Residents' Association to form the Independent Party Group.
- In April 2022, Adrian Oakley-Dow resigned from the Labour Party and Romana Gosine was expelled from it; both subsequently sat as independents. At the same time, Kelly Grehan replaced Sacha Gosine as leader of the Labour group.
- In May 2022, Green councillor Laura Edie and Residents' Association councillor Peter Harman formed the Alliance Group.

=== By-elections ===
==== Darenth ====
Darenth by-election, 6 May 2021
Party	Candidate	Votes	%	±%
Conservative	Maria Kelly	252	49.9	+2.5
Labour Co-op	Bill Cook	218	43.2	+11.6
Reform	Howard Bostridge	35	6.9	N/A
Majority		34	6.7	−9.1
Turnout		512	25.7	−2.9
Conservative hold		Swing	▼4.6	

The Darenth by-election followed the resignation of Conservative councillor Ian Armitt, with effect from 7 December 2020.

==== Wilmington, Sutton-at-Hone & Hawley ====
Wilmington, Sutton-at-Hone & Hawley by-election, 6 May 2021
Party	Candidate	Votes	%	±%
Conservative	Ellenor Palmer	1,465	73.3	+22.4
Labour	Maria Perry	445	22.3	+8.8
Reform	Barry Taylor	88	4.4	N/A
Majority		1,020	51.1	
Turnout		2,015	32.9	+0.3
Conservative hold		Swing	▲6.8	

The Wilmington, Sutton-at-Hone & Hawley by-election followed the resignation of Conservative councillor Calvin McLean.

==== Maypole & Leyton Cross ====
Maypole & Leyton Cross by-election, 27 January 2022
Party	Candidate	Votes	%	±%
Conservative	Kyle Stealey	334	63.1	−21.1
Green	Julian Hood	76	14.4	N/A
Labour	Leah Uwaibi	65	12.3	−3.5
Liberal Democrats	Kyle Marsh	54	10.2	N/A
Majority		258	48.7	−19.7
Turnout		533	24.5	−2.2
Conservative hold		Swing	▼8.8	

The Maypole & Leyton Cross by-election followed the death of Conservative councillor Ann Allen in October 2021.

==== Wilmington, Sutton-at-Hone & Hawley ====
Wilmington, Sutton-at-Hone & Hawley by-election, 27 January 2022
Party	Candidate	Votes	%	±%
Conservative	George Holt	996	67.8	+16.9
Labour	Maria Perry	272	18.5	+5.0
Liberal Democrats	Jane Hatzimasouras	200	13.6	N/A
Majority		724	49.3	
Turnout		1,471	24.1	−8.5
Conservative hold		Swing	▲6.0	

The Wilmington, Sutton-at-Hone & Hawley by-election followed the resignation of Conservative councillor Lucas Reynolds for personal reasons.

==== Wilmington, Sutton-at-Hone & Hawley ====
Wilmington, Sutton-at-Hone & Hawley by-election, 9 February 2023
Party	Candidate	Votes	%	±%
Conservative	Eddy Lampkin	808	69.0	+18.1
Labour	Jonathan Wynne	285	24.3	+10.8
Green	Julian Hood	78	6.7	N/A
Majority		523	44.7	
Turnout		1,178	19.3	−13.3
Conservative hold		Swing	▲3.7	

The vacancy followed the resignation of Conservative councillor Ellenor Palmer.
