= 2015 Dartford Borough Council election =

2015 UK local government election

Results of the 2015 Dartford Borough Council election

The 2015 Dartford Borough Council election took place on 7 May 2015 to elect members of the Dartford Borough Council in England. It was held on the same day as other local elections.

== Election result ==
"Residents Association" is the Swanscombe and Greenhithe Residents Association.

Turnout: 69.60%

Dartford Borough Council Election Result 7 May 2015
Party	Seats	Gains	Losses	Net gain/loss	Seats %	Votes %	Votes	+/−
Conservative	34	3	-	+3	77.00	49.72	57,514	
Labour	7	-	2	-2	16.00	29.55	34,179	
Residents	3	-	1	-1	7.00	4.29	4,960	
UKIP	0	-	-	-	0.00	14.31	16,552	
Green	0	-	-	-	0.00	1.95	2,254	
Independent	0	-	-	-	0.00	<1	210	

== Ward results ==
In multi-member wards, "majority" is taken as the difference in votes between the lowest of the elected and the highest of the not elected.

Bean & Darenth (3)
Party	Candidate	Votes	%	±%
Conservative	David Alan Hammock	1318	19.57	
Conservative	Ian Douglas Armitt	1299	19.28	
Conservative	Rebecca Louise Shanks	1171	17.38	
UKIP	Gary Paul Rogers	821	12.19	
Labour	Thomas William Cook	795	11.80	
Labour	Jeffrey Howard Froud	721	10.70	
Labour	Victoria Oguntope	611	9.07	
Majority		350		
Turnout		6736	67.64	
Conservative hold		Swing		
Conservative hold		Swing		
Conservative hold		Swing		

Brent (3)
Party	Candidate	Votes	%	±%
Conservative	Rosanna Marina Currans	1784	20.26	
Conservative	Avtar Singh Sandhu	1706	19.37	
Conservative	Drew Swinerd	1604	18.21	
Labour	Eric James Grover	1053	11.96	
Labour	Charlton Edward Thornhill	920	10.45	
Labour	Afroz Sheikh Mohammad Ahsan	905	10.28	
UKIP	Colin Robert Taylor	834	9.47	
Majority		551		
Turnout		8806	69.92	
Conservative hold		Swing		
Conservative hold		Swing		
Conservative hold		Swing		

Castle (1)
Party	Candidate	Votes	%	±%
Conservative	Paul Cutler	654	53.96	
Labour	Alan Oshioriame Omogbai	257	21.20	
UKIP	Keith Barry Thomas Ewers	171	14.11	
Residents	Linda Manchester	130	10.73	
Majority		397		
Turnout		1212	62.62	
Conservative hold		Swing		

Greenhithe (3)
Party	Candidate	Votes	%	±%
Conservative	Keith Martin Kelly	1175	15.99	
Conservative	Maria Barbara Kelly	1067	14.52	
Conservative	David James Mote	1049	14.27	
Residents	Susan Patricia Butterfill	700	9.52	
Residents	Peter Martin Harman	635	8.64	
Labour	Julian Timothy Bryant	565	7.69	
Labour	Rosetta Mary Barnett	558	7.59	
UKIP	William Allan Mackie	557	7.58	
Residents	Bryan Richard Parry	550	7.48	
Labour	Sarah Wimhurst	494	6.72	
Majority		349		
Turnout		7350	60.00	
Conservative gain from Residents		Swing		
Conservative hold		Swing		
Conservative hold		Swing		

Heath (3)
Party	Candidate	Votes	%	±%
Conservative	Andrew Ronald Lloyd	1952	20.61	
Conservative	Richard John Wells	1706	18.01	
Conservative	Patricia Anne Thurlow	1697	17.92	
Labour	David John Michael Stock	906	9.57	
Labour	Helen Mary Susan Flint	896	9.46	
Labour	Robert John Celino	861	9.09	
UKIP	Lisa Rogers	775	8.18	
UKIP	Ben Robert Fryer	678	7.16	
Majority		791		
Turnout		9471	76.12	
Conservative hold		Swing		
Conservative hold		Swing		
Conservative hold		Swing		

Joyce Green (2)
Party	Candidate	Votes	%	±%
Labour	Mark Andrew Maddison	866	21.88	
Labour	Bachchu Kailash Kaini	846	21.37	
Conservative	David William Butler	802	20.26	
UKIP	Linda Janet Moore	713	18.01	
Conservative	Oluwatobiloba Williams	489	12.35	
Green	Mark Simon Pilkington	242	6.11	
Majority		44		
Turnout		3958	72.31	
Labour hold		Swing		
Labour hold		Swing		

Joydens Wood (3)
Party	Candidate	Votes	%	±%
Conservative	Ann Dorothy Allen	2405	20.70	
Conservative	Marilyn Iris Peters	2225	19.15	
Conservative	Brian Garden	2188	18.83	
UKIP	Christine Ann Doucy	918	7.90	
UKIP	Roger Errol Doucy	876	7.54	
Labour	Paul Frederick Blankley	783	6.74	
UKIP	Robert Edward Norman	762	6.56	
Labour	Barbara Ann Stockbridge	737	6.34	
Labour	Hasina Carroll	725	6.24	
Majority		1270		
Turnout		11619	76.22	
Conservative hold		Swing		
Conservative hold		Swing		
Conservative hold		Swing		

Littlebrook (2)
Party	Candidate	Votes	%	±%
Labour	Daisy Page	916	27.22	
Labour	Thomas Anthony Maddison	799	23.74	
Conservative	Adam Crinion	629	18.69	
UKIP	David Roberts	560	16.64	
Conservative	Cathryn Ann Snowball	461	13.70	
Majority		170		
Turnout		3365	64.57	
Labour hold		Swing		
Labour hold		Swing		

Longfield, New Barn and Southfleet (3)
Party	Candidate	Votes	%	±%
Conservative	Jeremy Alan Kite	2545	23.28	
Conservative	Steven Hamilton Brown	2384	21.81	
Conservative	Roger Stephen Leonard Perfitt	2098	19.19	
UKIP	Diane Huxley	778	7.12	
UKIP	Roy William Alfred Huxley	696	6.37	
Labour	Michael John Allen	537	4.91	
Labour	Shaun Cummings	459	4.20	
Labour	John Roger Ward	431	3.94	
Green	Christopher John Burton	294	2.69	
Green	Sarah Lawrence	285	2.61	
Green	Andrew Danny Blatchford	214	1.96	
Independent	Jennifer Mary MacDonald	210	1.92	
Majority		1320		
Turnout		10931	82.20	
Conservative hold		Swing		
Conservative hold		Swing		
Conservative hold		Swing		

Newtown (3)
Party	Candidate	Votes	%	±%
Conservative	Calvin Samuel McLean	1507	16.44	
Conservative	Steven Ronald Jarnell	1394	15.21	
Conservative	Julie Anne Ozog	1332	14.53	
Labour	David John Baker	1204	13.13	
Labour	Phillip Rogers	1117	12.18	
UKIP	Clare Taylor	940	10.25	
Labour	Gurdial Singh Rai	925	10.09	
Green	Tessa Leigh Hampton	435	4.74	
Green	Jacqueline Burton	314	3.42	
Majority		128		
Turnout		9168	68.22	
Conservative hold		Swing		
Conservative hold		Swing		
Conservative hold		Swing		

Princes (3)
Party	Candidate	Votes	%	±%
Labour	Joshua Jones	1155	16.35	
Labour	Patrick Kelly	1080	15.29	
Conservative	Rebecca Florence Storey	1061	15.02	
Labour	Geoffrey Truscott Prout	992	14.05	
Conservative	Brian Walker	968	13.71	
Conservative	Jean Carol Shippam	933	13.21	
UKIP	Shan-E-Din Choycha	874	12.37	
Majority		69		
Turnout		7063	63.91	
Labour hold		Swing		
Labour hold		Swing		
Conservative gain from Labour		Swing		

Stone (3)
Party	Candidate	Votes	%	±%
Conservative	Lucy Alison Canham	1251	16.48	
Conservative	John Burrell	1210	15.94	
Labour	Jonathon Simon Hawkes	989	13.03	
Labour	Claire Pearce	952	12.54	
Conservative	Stephanie Anne Thredgle	870	11.46	
Labour	Catherine Mary Stafford	850	11.20	
UKIP	James Arthur Moore	769	10.13	
UKIP	Roger Arnold Cherrington Cockett	699	9.21	
Majority		37		
Turnout		7590	66.53	
Conservative hold		Swing		
Conservative gain from Labour		Swing		
Labour hold		Swing		

Sutton-at-Hone and Hawley (2)
Party	Candidate	Votes	%	±%
Conservative	Patrick Francis Coleman	1364	35.80	
Conservative	Lucas James Reynolds	899	23.60	
UKIP	Ivan Paul Burch	729	19.13	
Labour	Carole Ann Jones	436	11.44	
Labour	Brian Charles Matthews	382	10.03	
Majority		170		
Turnout		3810	73.46	
Conservative hold		Swing		
Conservative hold		Swing		

Swanscombe (3)
Party	Candidate	Votes	%	±%
Residents	Bryan Ernest Read	1017	13.63	
Residents	Richard John Lees	999	13.39	
Residents	John Alfred Hayes	929	12.45	
Labour	Steve Jacqueline Doran	881	11.81	
UKIP	Stephen Norman Wilders	840	11.26	
Labour	Alex Harvey	837	11.22	
Labour	Tina Flint	781	10.47	
Conservative	Dorcas Londres	457	6.13	
Conservative	Melissa Souza-Lima	383	5.13	
Conservative	Johannes Theodor Zumbusch	337	4.52	
Majority		48		
Turnout		7461	59.02	
Residents hold		Swing		
Residents hold		Swing		
Residents hold		Swing		

Town (2)
Party	Candidate	Votes	%	±%
Conservative	Matthew John Davis	752	22.09	
Conservative	Christopher Jon Shippam	650	19.09	
Labour	Alina Gaskin	568	16.68	
Labour	Graham Christopher David Steele	566	16.62	
UKIP	Sonia Elizabeth Keane	425	12.48	
UKIP	Michael Robert Wiltshire	296	8.69	
Green	Richard Andrew Estcourt	148	4.35	
Majority		82		
Turnout		3405	63.76	
Conservative hold		Swing		
Conservative hold		Swing		

West Hill (3)
Party	Candidate	Votes	%	±%
Conservative	Arron Bardoe	1733	18.35	
Conservative	Jan Michael Ozog	1568	16.61	
Conservative	Denzil James Reynolds	1564	16.56	
Labour	Aaron Bowater	1105	11.70	
Labour	David Michael Brooker	962	10.19	
Labour	Garry Graham Sturley	863	9.14	
UKIP	Simon John Blanchard	725	7.68	
UKIP	Josephine Anne Shippam	600	6.35	
Green	David Richard Jones	322	3.41	
Majority		459		
Turnout		9442	73.91	
Conservative hold		Swing		
Conservative hold		Swing		
Conservative hold		Swing		

Wilmington (2)
Party	Candidate	Votes	%	±%
Conservative	Derek Edward Hunnisett	1526	35.64	
Conservative	Edward John Lampkin	1347	31.46	
UKIP	Robert Francis McLeod	516	12.05	
Labour	Susan May Brooker	487	11.37	
Labour	Derek Alexander Hills	406	9.48	
Majority		831		
Turnout		4282	76.81	
Conservative hold		Swing		
Conservative hold		Swing		
