= Wakley =

Surname list

Wakley is a name that was brought to England by the ancestors of the Wakley family when they migrated to the region after the Norman Conquest in 1066.

== Notable people ==
- Ralph Wakley (born 1941), American biathlete
- Thomas Wakley (1795–1862), English surgeon and founding editor of The Lancet
- James G. Wakley (1825–1886), the son of Thomas Wakley and the joint editor of The Lancet
- Thomas Henry Wakley (1821–1907), the son of Thomas Wakley and the joint editor of The Lancet

== See also ==
- Stuart Wakley Fleetwood (born in 1986), English footballer
- Cooper v Wakley, English tort law case
