= Bad Veins =

American indie pop musical group

- Origin: Cincinnati, Ohio, United States
- Genre: Indie rock
- Years active: 2007–present
- Labels: Dovecote; Dangerboat; Modern Outsider; Dynamite
- Members: Benjamin Davis
- Past members: Sebastien Schultz; Jake Bonta

Bad Veins is an American indie pop musical project by Benjamin Davis, formed in Cincinnati, Ohio, United States.

== History ==
Known for sporting vintage military clothing, using a telephone to sing into while performing, and utilizing an old reel-to-reel named Irene for backing tracks. Army green and red roses, similar to their debut album cover, is a visual staple during their live performance.

In 2008, Bad Veins won the first ever Target Music Maker Award at the Tribeca Film Festival.

Their self-titled debut album was released on July 21, 2009. The first single off the album was "Gold and Warm," which was used on Good Morning America’s "Your Three Words" segment on February 27, 2010. Dan Harris, an ABC News correspondent, named the debut the 7th best album of 2009 on ABC's Amplified blog, calling it "criminally overlooked" and "utterly fantastic." The USA Today blog Pop Candy named the last track on the album, "Go Home" one of the Top 20 Songs of 2009.

Bad Veins has garnered considerable praise in the blog scene. A post on Radio Free Chicago discussed the band's new EP, titled Outliers, which came out on June 15, 2010, and described the duo's stage dynamic: "At the end of the day, Bad Veins is one of the Midwest's most talented bands, regardless. They're comprised of one of the most passionate and energetic drummers I've ever seen and Davis is a talented composer and singer to say the least. After seeing Davis play a number of solo shows, I can attest to the fact that the slight distortion used on his voice is not to mask any weakness but instead is a deliberate affect used by Davis to suit the songs. Without the stage tricks that Bad Veins is gaining notoriety for, Davis could be a great folk musician, and a number of moments on Outliers showcase just that."

The Line of Best Fit drew comparisons to Joy Division and OMD. Acts the band have frequently played with or toured with include Two Door Cinema Club, Walk the Moon, Frightened Rabbit, We Were Promised Jetpacks, The Dig, Local H, As Tall As Lions, We Are Scientists, LoveLikeFire, The Subjects, Kevin Devine, Lightning Love, Maps & Atlases, Thrice and You, You're Awesome.

On January 24, 2012, Bad Veins announced that they will put out a new release, The Mess We've Made, via Austin, Texas-based label Modern Outsider. The Mess We've Made was released on April 24, 2012.

== Band members ==
Current

- Benjamin Davis (2007–present)

Former

- Jake Bonta (2013–2016)
- Sebastien Schultz (2007–2013)

== Discography ==
- Falling Tide (2007)
- Bad Veins (2009)
- Outliers EP (2010)
- The Mess We've Made (2012)
- The Mess Remade (2015)
- Imposter (2023)
