= Thomas Smethurst =

Thomas Smethurst (c.1810 - ?) was an apothecary, with a medical degree from a non-British university. Born in Budworth, Cheshire, by the 1850s he ran the Farnham Hydropathic Establishment in Surrey and in the 1851 census was living in Badshot with his wife Mary.

He is most notable for being convicted then pardoned of the murder by poisoning of Isabella Bankes, who had been living with Smethurst and his wife at 4 Rifle Terrace, Bayswater. He was sometimes known as "the Richmond Poisoner", as he and Bankes had lodged in Richmond (with Bankes going by "Mrs Smethurst") from 4 February until 3 May that year, when she died there.

The coroner's inquest into the death indicted Smethurst for murder and his trial at the Central Criminal Court began on 7-8 July 1859, with Serjeant-at-law John Humffreys Parry and George Markham Giffard as counsels for the defence, Sergeant-at-law William Ballantine, William Bodkin, Mr. Clark and Mr Merewether (a son of Henry Alworth Merewether) as counsels for the prosecution and Sir Frederick Pollock presiding - Smethurst pleaded Not Guilty. It was then interrupted by juror Thomas Instone suddenly being taken ill but resumed from 15 to 18 August.

The chief toxicology witness was Alfred Swaine Taylor, though in his testimony he admitted contamination to one of his arsenic tests. The trial ended in a Guilty verdict but Queen Victoria accepted Benjamin Brodie and Home Secretary George Cornewall Lewis's advice to grant Smethurst a royal pardon for the murder conviction, though he still had to serve a year in Wandsworth Prison for the bigamous marriage with Bankes. After his sentence he successfully defended the validity of Bankes' will (leaving him all her property) against a challenge from her relatives.
