= 1931 Dissolution Honours =

British government recognitions

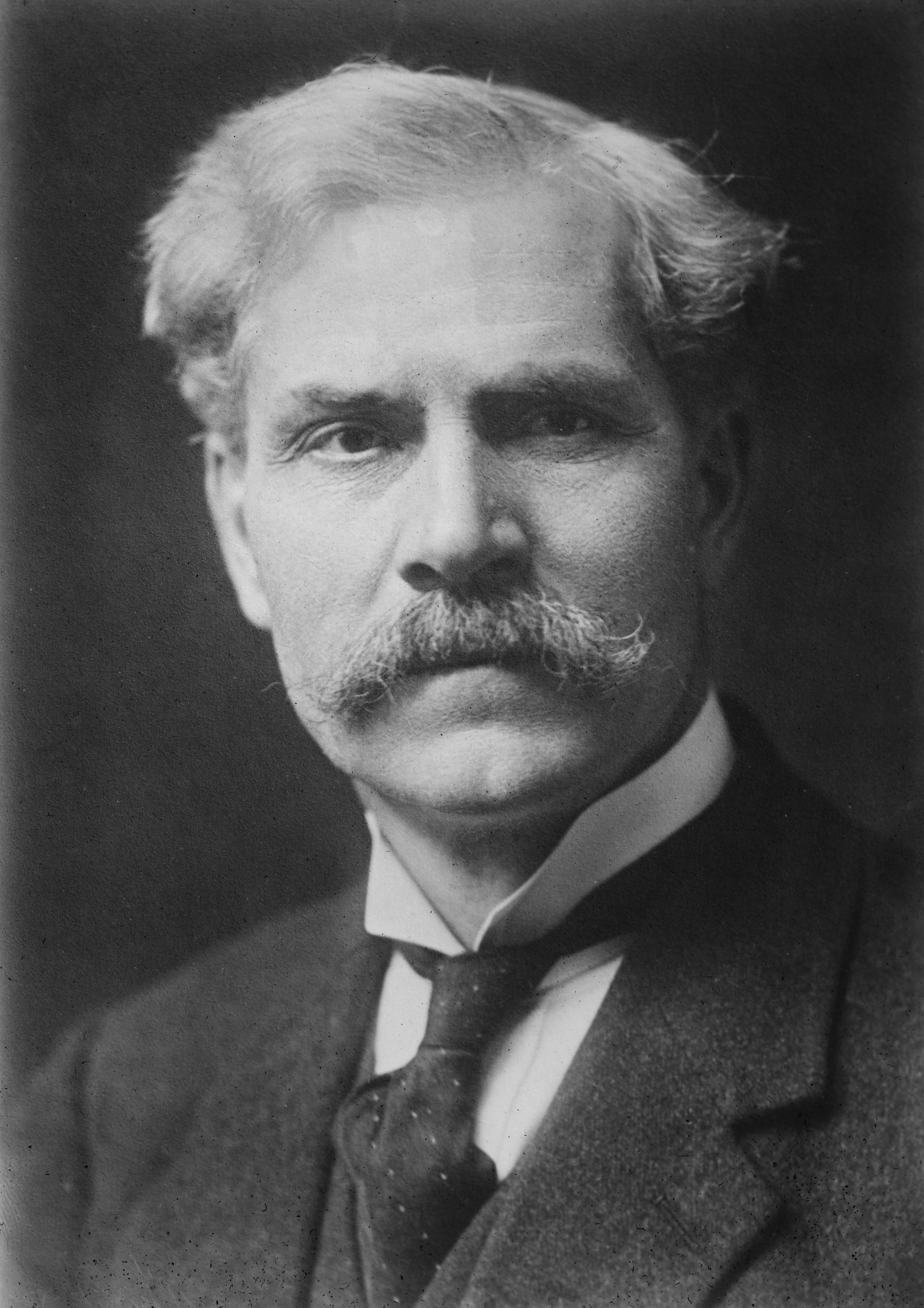
Ramsay MacDonald

The 1931 Dissolution Honours List was issued on 17 November 1931 at the advice of the Prime Minister, Ramsay MacDonald.

== Viscountcy ==
- The Right Honourable Philip Snowden, Chancellor of the Exchequer, 1924 and 1929–1931.

== Baronies ==
- Sir Robert Hunt Stapylton Dudley Lydston Newman, Bt., J.P., D.L., Member of Parliament for Exeter 1918–1931. For public and political services.
- Sir William Martin Conway, M.A., LL.D., F.S.A., Member of Parliament for the Combined English Universities 1918–1931. For public and political services.

== Knighthoods ==
- George Masterman Gillett, Esq., J.P., M.P. Member of Parliament for Finsbury since 1923. Secretary, Department of Overseas Trade, 1929 – August 1931. Parliamentary Secretary to the Ministry of Transport, August to October, 1931.
- John Charles Watson, Esq., M.B.E., K.C. Solicitor General for Scotland, 1928–1931.
