= Ben Collins =

Ben or Benjamin Collins may refer to:

- Benjamin Collins (Kent cricketer) (1820–1903), English cricketer
- Benjamin Collins (Cambridge University cricketer) (born 1977), English cricketer
- Ben Collins (American football) (1921–2014), American football player and coach
- Ben Collins (racing driver) (born 1975), English racing car driver, "The Stig" on TV series Top Gear
- Ben Collins (reporter), American reporter
- Ben Collins (footballer, born 1961), retired Liberian soccer midfielder
- Ben Collins (soccer, born 2000), Australian soccer player
- Ben Collins (writer), American screenwriter
- Ben Collins, guitarist in the band Lightning Love
- Ben Collins, guitarist in the band Chronic Future

== See also ==
- Benjamin Collins Brodie (disambiguation)
- Collins (surname)
