= Stride & Prejudice =

2013 video game

- Developer: No Crusts Interactive
- Publisher: No Crusts Interactive
- Director: Carla Engelbrecht Fisher
- Platforms: iOS, Fire OS
- Release: iOS; October 31, 2013; Fire OS; April 1, 2014
- Genre: Endless runner
- Mode: Single-player

Stride & Prejudice is a 2013 endless runner game developed and published by No Crusts Interactive. It is based on the 1813 novel Pride and Prejudice by Jane Austen. The player controls Austen's character Elizabeth Bennett in a two-dimensional perspective as she runs along the words in the novel's text, tapping the touchscreen to jump whenever a gap appears. The player can either choose to play until they fall or play endlessly regardless of falling. Fisher designed the game with the intention of creating a gateway to both game players and book readers, as well as to celebrate the 200th anniversary of Pride and Prejudice. It has received a generally positive reception for the cleverness of the concept, though reviewers were also critical of the constant pace of the reading and the relative difficulty involved in retaining information.

== Gameplay ==
Players control Elizabeth Bennett, the protagonist of Jane Austen's Pride and Prejudice, from a two-dimensional perspective. Elizabeth automatically runs along the text of the book, which serves as platforms for her to run on. Players must prevent Elizabeth from falling off of words by tapping the screen to jump over gaps in the text. Stride & Prejudice has two modes of play: Survival mode, where players see how far they can get in the story before Elizabeth falls, and Reader mode, where players can play endlessly with infinite attempts. The game's scrolling speed can be increased or decreased and the color of the text and background can be changed.

== Development and release ==
Stride & Prejudice was developed by No Crusts Interactive and directed by Carla Engelbrecht Fisher, who created it with the intention of it being a gateway work for both gamers and book readers. Fisher sought out subject matter that was public domain, and chose Pride and Prejudice to coincide with its 200th anniversary. During development of the game, Fisher created demos in order to get feedback and create press for the game. She has considered making more games in this vein based on other books, including Mary Shelley's Frankenstein and "Anna Karenina", but felt that Pride and Prejudice lent itself better to this style than those did. While she admits that endless runners are not a good means by which to read a book, due to the effort it takes, she argues that interactivity has a place in literature. Stride & Prejudice was released for iOS devices on October 31, 2013, and for Fire OS devices on April 1, 2014.

== Reception ==
Stride & Prejudice was met with a generally positive reception. It reached number 14 on the Apple Education Store, though fell out of the top 100 after four days. It was included in a recommendations list by Eric Smith for The Mary Sue of "bookish iPhone games", which praised the quality of the game and its value. Eli Hodapp for TouchArcade found the game clever and readable due to its ease of play, though they noted that iOS has better auto-runner titles. Gamezebo writer Joe Jasko similarly found it clever, suggesting that it would be a more fun way to experiencing the book.

Stride & Prejudice faced criticism for the relative difficulty faced by players trying to follow the story, including Michelle Parnett-Dwyer for The Strong National Museum of Play, who found it difficult to keep track of the characters and felt that people who want to read Austen's work would not bother with Stride & Prejudice. PC Gamer writer Philip Michaels felt it was clever and entertaining, he agreed that the genre made it difficult. The Register writer Simon Sharwood, echoing similar sentiments, also noted that players interested in a more "hyperkinetic fare" would not be interested. Ryan Vogt for The Independent felt that the Reader mode was an interesting take on the autorunning genre, and that the Survival mode helped put early passages, including its opening line, into players' heads. However, he was less enthused by its pace, feeling that it negatively impacted the ability to follow the story. He suggested that it wasn't really a game, stating that the action of tapping the screen was just an unconscious action, similar to turning a page to progress the story. He also felt that, even with the ability to adjust the pace, Despite this, he felt interested in reading the book, though he didn't experience it through the game.

== See also ==
- Ever, Jane
