= John Humffreys Parry =

British barrister

John Humffreys Parry (24 January 1816 – 10 January 1880) was a British barrister, who became serjeant-at-law.

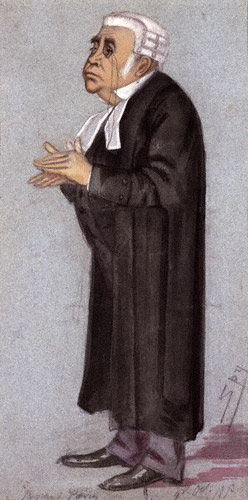
John Humffreys Parry, Vanity Fair caricature 13 December 1873

== Early life ==
The son of John Humffreys Parry the antiquarian (1786–1825), he was born in London on 24 January 1816. He received a commercial education at the Philological School, Marylebone, and spent a short time in a merchant's office in London; but then took a post in the printed-book department in the British Museum. He attended lectures at the Aldersgate Institution and studied for the bar.

== Legal career ==
Parry was called to the bar in June 1843 at the Middle Temple. On the home circuit he built up a good criminal business, principally at the Old Bailey and the Middlesex sessions. Appointment as a serjeant-at-law, in June 1856, led him to success also in the civil courts. He was also largely employed in compensation cases, especially for the London, Brighton, and South Coast Railway.

Parry obtained a patent of precedence in 1864 from Lord Westbury, and then led the home circuit. In November 1878 he was elected a bencher of the Middle Temple. His best-known cases were the trial of Marie Manning and her husband in 1849; the defence of Thomas Smethurst for murdering Isabella Bankes, in July and August 1859; of Franz Müller for the murder of Thomas Briggs, in October 1864; the Overend and Gurney prosecution in 1869; the indictment of Arthur Orton the Tichborne claimant, in 1873–4; and Whistler v. Ruskin in November 1878. Vanity Fair published a caricature of Parry on 13 December 1873.

== Political views ==
In politics Parry was a Radical—or advanced liberal—and at the time of the first Chartist movement he sympathised with some of their moderate views, and knew many of their leaders: William Lovett mentioned assistance received from him. Parry was also one of the founders of the Complete Suffrage Association in 1842.

In 1847 Parry unsuccessfully contested Norwich against Lord Douro and Sir Samuel Morton Peto. In 1857 he was beaten in Finsbury by Tom Duncombe and William Cox, coming third at the poll despite heavy spending.

== Death ==
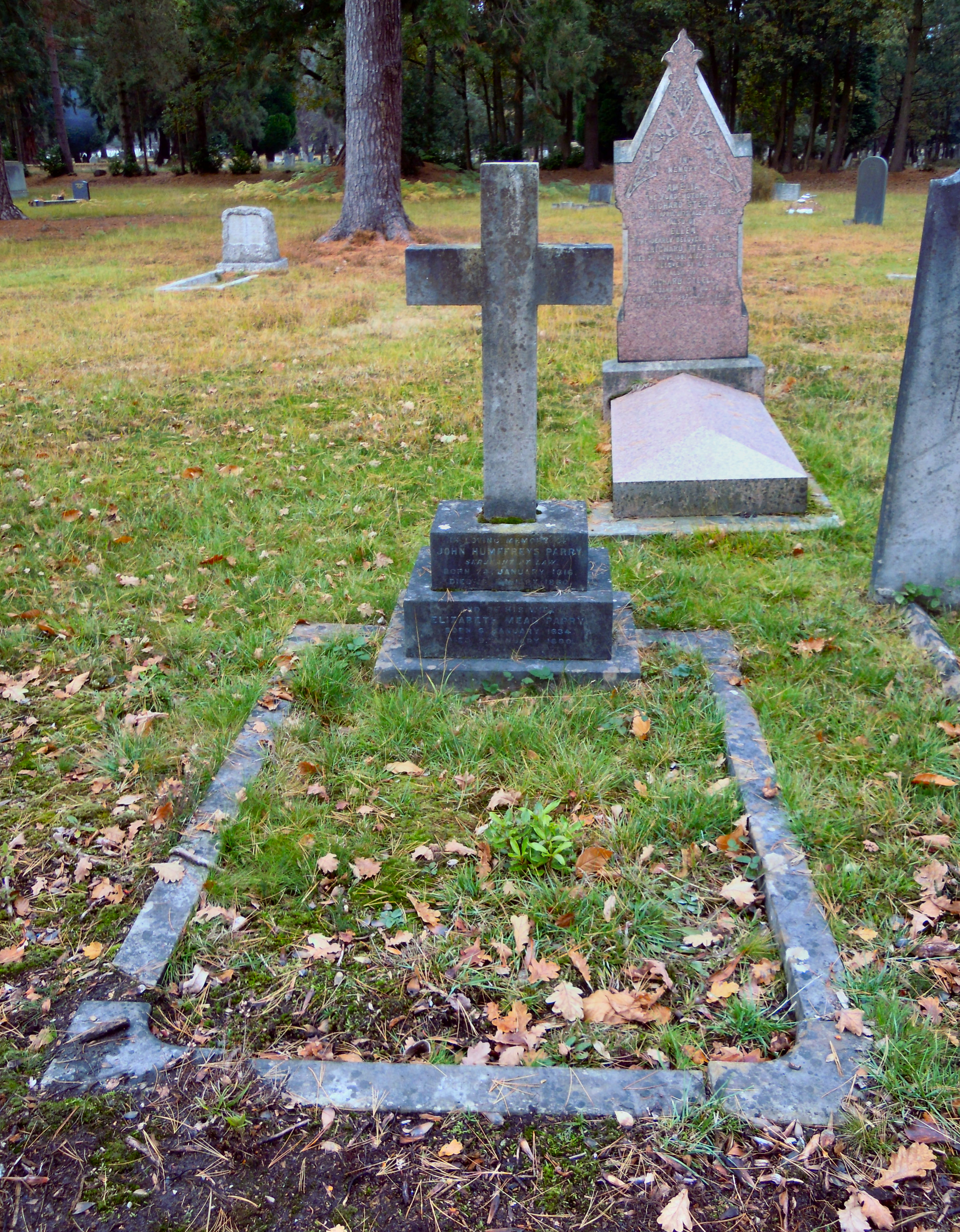
Parry's grave in Brookwood Cemetery

Parry died on 10 January 1880 at his house in Holland Park, Kensington. He was buried at Brookwood Cemetery in Woking on 15 January 1880.

== Family ==
Parry was twice married: first, to Margaret New, who died on 13 September 1856; and afterwards to Elizabeth Mead, daughter of Edwin Abbott; she predeceased him by a few hours. He had two sons, of whom the elder, John Humffreys, an actor, died in 1891; the second was Edward Abbott Parry, judge and man of letters.

== Notes ==
Attribution

This article incorporates text from a publication now in the public domain: Lee, Sidney, ed. (1895). "Parry, John Humffreys (1816-1880)". Dictionary of National Biography. Vol. 43. London: Smith, Elder & Co.
