= Bad Veins (album) =

Studio album by Bad Veins
- Released: 21 July 2009
- Genre: Indie rock
- Length: 38:32
- Label: Dangerbird Records
- Producer: Benjamin Davis, Sebastien Shultz, Justin Bailey

Bad Veins chronology
Demos EP (2008)	Bad Veins (2009)	Outliers EP (2010)

Bad Veins is the debut album by the indie rock duo of the same name, released on 21 February 2009 through Dangerbird Records. The first single off the album was "Gold and Warm," which was used on Good Morning America’s "Your Three Words" segment on February 27, 2010. Dan Harris, an ABC News correspondent, named the debut the 7th best album of 2009 on ABC’s Amplified blog, calling it "criminally overlooked" and "utterly fantastic." The USA Today blog Pop Candy named the last track on the album, "Go Home" one of the Top 20 Songs of 2009.

== Track listing ==
All tracks are written by Benjamin Davis.

No.	Title	Length
1.	"Found"	4:35
2.	"Gold and Warm"	3:36
3.	"Crosseyed"	4:27
4.	"You Kill"	3:55
5.	"Afraid"	2:44
6.	"The Lie"	4:00
7.	"Falling Tide"	2:39
8.	"Dry Out"	3:50
9.	"This Ending"	4:01
10.	"Go Home"	4:45

== Reception ==
Reviews of the album have been generally mixed-to-favorable. Below are some quotes from articles on the release:

Doublestereo.com - "The self titled album from Bad Veins is one of the best records I have received all year... The album overall is solid and I have nothing bad to say about it really. It is danceable, well written and sounds like it picked apart the best pieces from other great bands."

SnobsMusic.Net - "There's been a fair bit of hype generated around Cincinnati indie duo Bad Veins. The public gets to see if it's worth it now with the release of the band's debut album Bad Veins. The short answer to the question is a resounding no." (3.5/10 rating)

EachNoteSecure.Com - "And now, the album we have all been waiting for is finally here and I am happy to tell you that it is totally worth the wait."

MetroMix Cincinnati - "Many have chalked up Bad Veins’ accomplishments to luck. But in reality, the steps the band has taken to get where they have been as carefully orchestrated as their songs: Infectious, pop-influenced arrangements marked by Davis’s soaring, distorted vocals and gritty guitars; Schultz’s, dramatic, driving drumbeats; and backing tracks recorded on a 1973 Pioneer reel-to-reel tape player named Irene."

The 8th Circuit - "I was surprised at how amazing the album sounded. It still wasn't as good as my monstrous expectations of it, but every song and sound on the album combined perfectly; a feeling that fits together with the more surprising fact that, upon being submitted to Dangerbird Records, not one thing was changed about the album. One can tell how much the band worked on this album; from the sweet orchestral sounds of 'Dry Out' to the rocking chorus of 'Crosseyed', every song has its own niceties."

== Personnel ==
Bad Veins

- Benjamin Davis– vocals, guitar, keys (wrote all songs and arranged album)
- Sebastiens Schulz– drums (all percussion arrangements)

Additional personnel

- Recorded, Engineered and Produced By – Bad Veins and Justin Bailey for Black Iris Music
- Mixed By – Justin Bailey for Black Iris Music
- Mastered By – Stephen Marcussen
- Trombones on 'Found' – Cam Dinunzio
- Saxophones on 'Go home' – Mandy Levy and Justin Bailey
- A&R – Jeff Castelaz / Peter Walker
- Management – Tyler Childs
- Legal – Bryan Christner
- Cover Photo – Irene Little
