= William Ballantine =

Serjeant William Ballantine
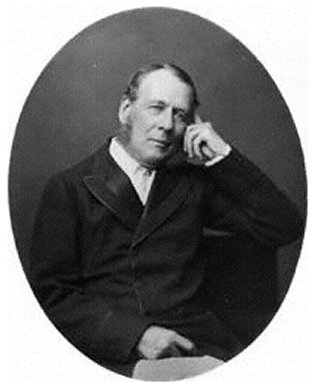
- Born: 3 January 1812; Camden, London
- Died: 9 January 1887 (aged 75); Margate
- Education: St Paul's School
- Occupation: Lawyer

Serjeant William Ballantine SL (3 January 1812 – 9 January 1887) was an English Serjeant-at-law, a legal position defunct since the legal reforms of the 1870s.

== Early career ==
Born in Howland Street, Tottenham Court Road in Camden, London, the son of a police-magistrate, Ballantine was educated at St Paul's School, and called to the Bar in 1834. He joined the Criminal Court and travelled the judicial 'Home Circuit', which necessitated him attending courts in Hertfordshire, Kent, Surrey, Sussex and Essex. As a young man he had a wide familiarity with dramatic and literary society, meeting many writers, including Charles Dickens, William Makepeace Thackeray, and Anthony Trollope, and this background helped to obtain for him a large legal practice, particularly in criminal cases. In the late 1840s, Ballantine became known as a formidable cross-examiner, having become involved in several famous cases, where he was able to display these skills. His great rival at during this period was Serjeant Parry (1816–1880), facing him in the Thomas Smethurst murder trial in 1859 for instance, with Ballantine for the prosecution and Parry for the defence.

== Serjeant-at-Law ==
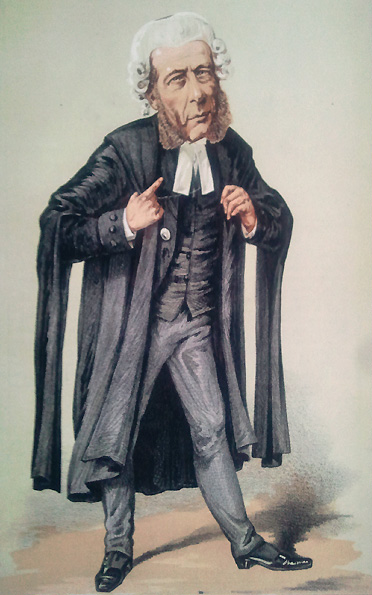
"He resisted the temptation to cross-examine a Prince of the blood" As depicted by "ATn" (Alfred Thompson) in Vanity Fair, 5 March 1870

Ballantine became a Serjeant-at-law in 1856, being then entitled to wear the white coif or cap of that rank (see illustration). He was one of the last Serjeants in the courts, that title and position being abolished in the judicial reforms of 1874. During the 1860s, he took on a number of high-profile cases.

=== Mordaunt divorce trial ===
Ballantine served as Counsel for Sir Charles Mordaunt in the then notorious divorce case against his wife. Lady Mordaunt, who, much younger than her husband, informed him that he was not the father of her child. She admitted to him that she had committed adultery with a number of men, including the Prince of Wales, 'often, and in open day.'

It became clear that because of these revelations that the Prince of Wales would have to be summoned to court to give evidence in the case. Although he could be subpoenaed, he could not be forced to give evidence; Queen Victoria, his mother, advised him not to attend the court. However, the Prince agreed to attend the court, and to be questioned. After delicate questioning by Lady Mordaunt's counsel, the Prince denied that 'any improper familiarity or criminal act' had taken place between himself and Lady Mordaunt. It was generally believed that by stating this the Prince had perjured himself.

Ballantine, as counsel for Lord Mordaunt, the plaintiff, was entitled to cross-examine the Prince of Wales. Instead, in an attempt to save the Prince from any embarrassment, he declared that he had no questions for His Royal Highness, thus saving the Prince's honour. However, Ballantine lost the case because he had failed to convince the jury that Lady Mordaunt was guilty.

== Retirement ==
In the early 1880s, Ballantine retired from the law in order to write and travel, publishing several volumes of reminiscences. His interest in the theatre and journalism made him a familiar sight around London. Although he was recognised as an incisive cross-examiner, Ballantine was not regarded by his peers as being 'a model legal mind.' The Law Times, in a brief notice, stated that Ballantine "left behind him scarcely any lesson, even in his own poor biography, which the rising generation could profitably learn." But in the same issue there is a full obituary with a detailed description of his life and career, ending with "[…] he had an individuality of character which gave him a position almost unique in the estimation of the public. His intimate acquaintance with human nature made him an excellent prosecutor or counsel for the defence in criminal trials. […] He was a skilful cross-examiner, an amusing speaker, and a great adept in the art of penetrating the motives and designs of criminals."

He died at Margate on 9 January 1887, aged 76 years. Ballantine's private life was considered Bohemian; and though he earned large sums, he died poor. Barrister and politician Sir Edward Clarke wrote that Ballantine spent the latter part of his life "in exile at Boulogne, only being saved from poverty by the allowance made him by his son, which was generously supplemented by six members of the Bar".

== Family ==
On 4 December 1841, he married Eliza, daughter of Henry Gyles of London. The DNB reports that he left no issue, but a variety of other sources record that he was the father of William Henry Walter Ballantine, an attorney on the South Eastern Circuit and a Member of Parliament.

== Other cases ==
Among Ballantine's other notable cases were:

- his successful prosecution of Franz Muller for the murder of Mr. Briggs in 1864,
- his successful prosecution of Madame Rachel for fraud in 1868,
- his skilful defence of the Tichborne claimant in 1871, and
- his defence of the Gaekwad (Gaekwar) Maharaja of Baroda in 1875, his fee in this last case being one of the largest ever known at the time.
