= John Watson (advocate) =

Scottish Historic Figure

Sir John Charles Watson, MBE KC (9 July 1883 – 8 February 1944) was an advocate and sheriff from Scotland. He served from 1929 to 1931 as Solicitor General for Scotland in Ramsay MacDonald's second Labour Government.

A long-standing activist in the Scottish Liberal Party, his political ambitions were thwarted after his military service in World War I. Instead he built a successful legal practice, and grew closer to the Labour Party, leading to his appointment in 1929 as a law officer.

== Early life ==
Watson was born in Paisley on 9 July 1883. His father Henry C. Watson (died 1929) was editor of a local newspaper, the Paisley Daily Express.

He was educated locally at the John Neilson Institution, and then at the University of Glasgow. After graduating with an MA in 1905 and an LLB in 1908, he was admitted to the Faculty of Advocates in 1909.

== Career ==
With the help of his connections in the Liberal Party, Watson built a substantial legal practice. It included a lot of Parliamentary work.

Watson served in the armed forces throughout World War I. He initially joined the Royal Fusiliers, serving with the Mediterranean Expeditionary Force and then with the Egyptian Expeditionary Force.

He then joined the Royal Flying Corps and its successor the Royal Air Force, reaching the rank of captain. Stationed in Palestine from 1916 onward, his duties with the RAF included flying a 12-person secret expedition to the Hedjaz to liaise with Lawrence of Arabia. He was mentioned in dispatches, and in 1918, he was made a Member of the Order of the British Empire (MBE).

After the war, he was expected to be the Liberal candidate for the Paisley by-election in January 1920. However, the party selected instead H. H. Asquith, the former party leader and Prime Minister who had lost his seat in East Fife at the 1918 general election.

Watson abandoned further hopes of a Parliamentary seat, and instead developed his legal career. He became one of the most prominent advocates, and in 1928 he was one of Oscar Slater's counsel in a successful appeal against Slater's conviction in 1909 for murder.

He took silk in April 1929, becoming a King's Counsel. Two months later, in June 1929, he was appointed as Solicitor General for Scotland by Ramsay MacDonald. Watson's sympathies had shifted towards Labour since his disappointment in 1920, but he was never a member of the Labour Party. His appointment reflected the difficulties which Macdonald had in appointing Scottish law officers.

He was knighted in the Dissolution Honours in November 1931 and appointed as Sheriff of Caithness, Orkney and Shetland.

In his spare time, he worked to support the armed services, especially the Highland regiments. During World War II, while his son served overseas with the RAF, Watson served on a number of government committees. Watson was chairman of the Scottish Woolen Comforts Council, and his wife helped to provide woollens to RAF personnel.

== Personal life ==
Watson married Dr Olive Robertson in 1915. They had one son.

== Death ==
On 8 February 1944, Watson died suddenly at Stoke on Trent, on a train from London to Edinburgh. He was 60 years old.

The inquest in Hanley found that he died from angina pectoris, having been weakened by influenza about six weeks before his death.

Legal offices
Preceded by Wilfrid Normand	Solicitor General for Scotland; 1929–1931	Succeeded by Wilfrid Normand
