= Robert Grant (MP) =

British lawyer and politician

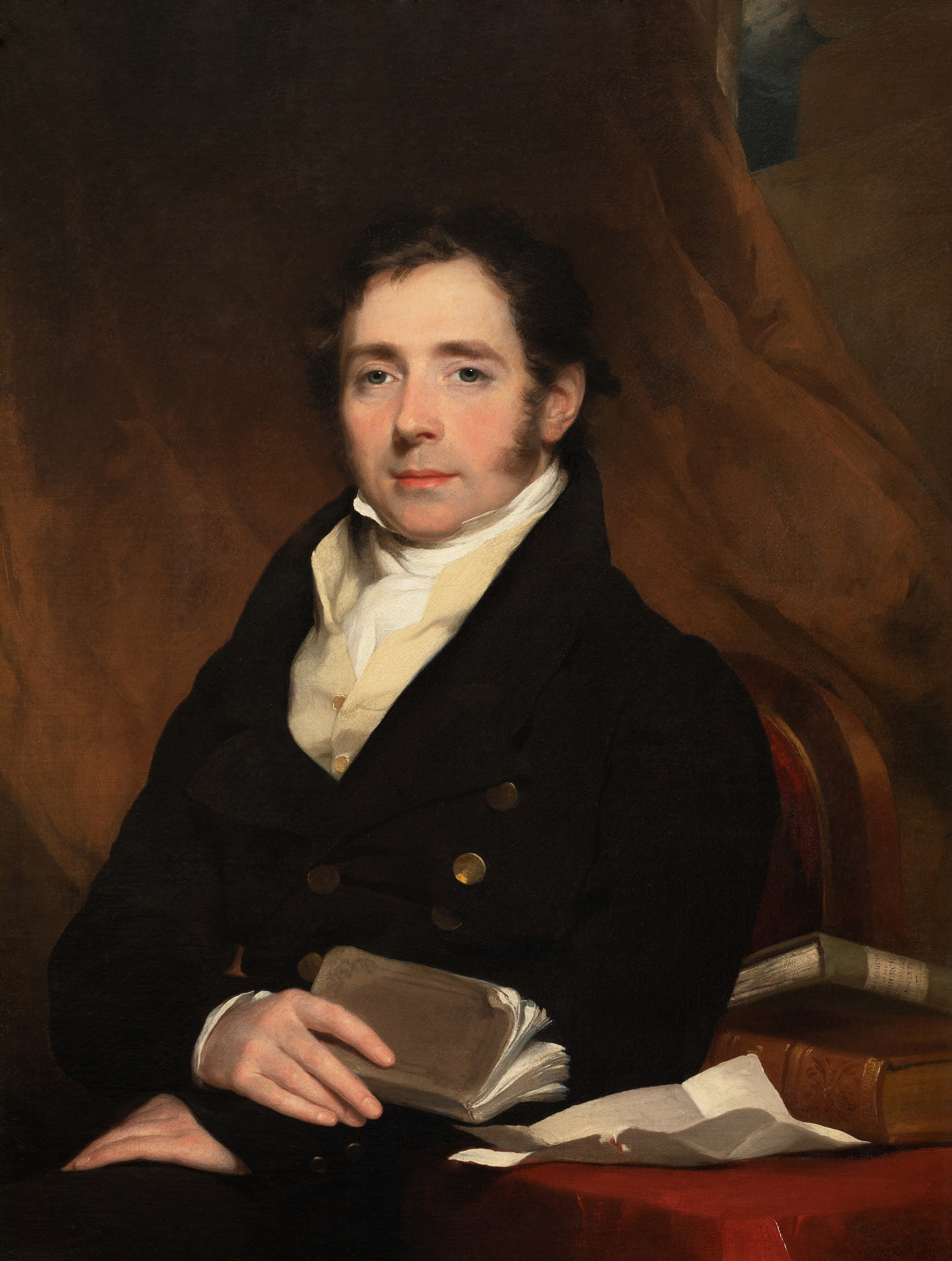
Portrait of Robert Grant, by William Beechey, 1823

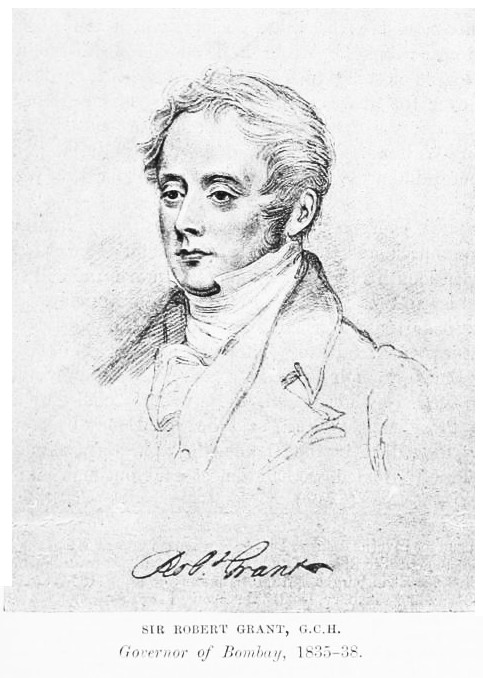
Sir Robert Grant.

Sir Robert Grant, GCH (1779 – 9 July 1838) was a British lawyer and politician. Born in Bengal in 1779, his family relocated to England in 1790.

He studied law at Magdalene College, Cambridge, and in 1807 passed the bar. He became a Commissioner in Bankruptcy. Between 1818 and 1832, he was an elected member of Parliament for several different Burghs.

On 11 August 1829, in Inverness-shire Grant married Margaret Davidson, daughter of Sir David Davidson. They had four children, two daughters and two sons. Grant died in Dapodi, in Poona, India in 1838.

== Life ==
Robert Grant was born in India, the second son of Charles Grant, chairman of the Directors of the Honourable East India Company, and younger brother of Charles Grant, later Lord Glenelg. After arriving in Britain with their father in 1790, the two brothers were entered as students of Magdalene College, Cambridge, in 1795. In 1801 Charles was fourth wrangler and senior Chancellor's medallist; Robert was third wrangler and second Chancellor's medallist.

Grant was called to the bar the same day as his brother, 30 January 1807, and entered into legal practice, becoming King's Sergeant in the Court of the Duchy of Lancaster, and one of the Commissioners in Bankruptcy. He was elected Member of Parliament for the Elgin Burghs in 1818, and for the Inverness Burghs in 1826. The latter constituency he represented for four years. In 1830 and 1831, he was returned for Norwich, and in 1832 for Finsbury. He advocated for the removal of the disabilities of the Jews, and twice carried bills on the subject through the House of Commons. They were, however, rejected in the Upper House, which did not yield on the question until 1858, twenty years after Grant's death. In 1832 he became Judge Advocate General, and in 1834 was appointed Governor of Bombay. As governor, Grant was a law unto himself and under his rule a multitude of large-scale projects were pushed forward which were to transform the shape of British policy in the East. He was a key player in the decision to occupy Aden, which was carried out shortly after his death.

He died at Dapodi, near Poona on 9 July 1838. His remains are housed in the St. Mary's Church, Poona.

== Works ==
In his younger days, Grant published an essay on the trade and government of India, and a sketch of the early history of the British East India Company. He was the author of a volume of sacred poems, which was edited and published after his death by his brother, Lord Glenelg. This volume includes some hymns; his best known hymn is "O Worship the King", based on Psalm 104. Additional hymns include "Saviour, when in dust to thee" and "Confidence in God."

== Legacy ==
Grant Medical College, the oldest medical college in Mumbai, India, is named after Robert Grant, as are Grant Road and Grant Road Station in the same city.

== Family ==
Grant married Margaret, only daughter of Sir David Davidson of Cantray, with issue two sons and two daughters:

- Sir Charles Grant, K.C.S.I, formerly a Member of Council in India;
- Colonel Robert Grant, R.E., Deputy Adjutant General;
- Sibylla Sophia, married to Granville Ryder, Esq.; and
- Constance Charemile, who died in childhood.

Ten years after his death, Margaret married Josceline Percy, second son of the Earl of Beverley, with issue one son, George Algernon, born in 1849, who later became Capt. and Lt. Col. of the Grenadier Guards.

Parliament of the United Kingdom
Preceded by Patrick Milne	Member of Parliament for Elgin Burghs; 1818–1820	Succeeded by Archibald Farquharson
Preceded by George Cumming	Member of Parliament for Inverness Burghs; 1826–1830	Succeeded by John Baillie
Preceded by William Smith; Jonathan Peel	Member of Parliament for Norwich; 1830–1832; With: Richard Hanbury Gurney	Succeeded by Viscount Stormont; Sir James Scarlett
New constituency	Member of Parliament for Finsbury; 1832–1834; With: Robert Spankie	Succeeded by Thomas Slingsby Duncombe; Robert Spankie
Legal offices
Preceded by Sir John Beckett	Judge Advocate General; 1832–1834	Succeeded by Robert Cutlar Fergusson
Political offices
Preceded by The Earl of Clare	Governor of Bombay; 1835–1838	Succeeded by Sir James Rivett-Carnac
