= George Gillett (politician) =

British banker and politician

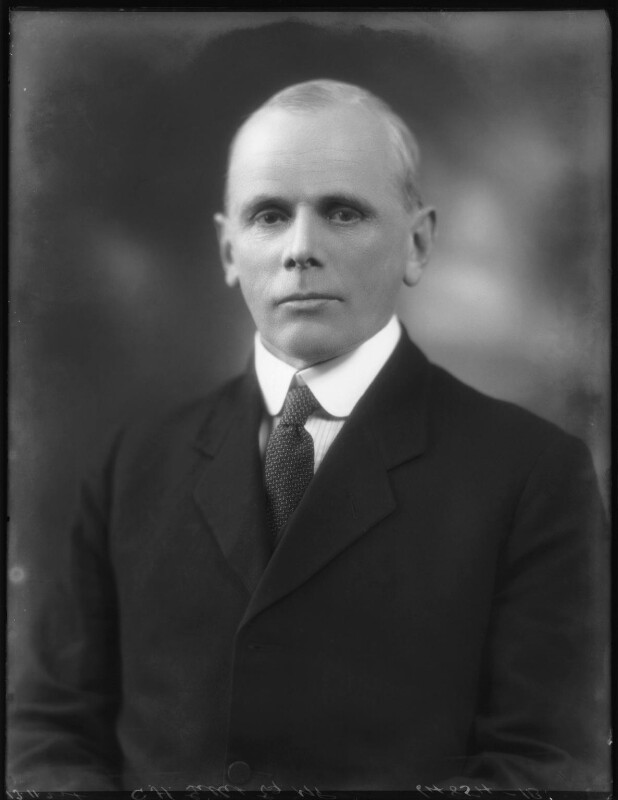
Gillett

Sir George Masterman Gillett (1870 – 10 August 1939) was a British banker and politician.

== Life ==
Born in Islington, he was the son of George Gillett, a banker and member of a well-known Quaker family. He was educated at a Society of Friends boarding school in Scarborough, Yorkshire and in Paris. In 1894 he became a partner the family business of Gillett Brothers, discount bankers of Lombard Street in the City of London.

Gillett was very active in charitable and social work in London, and in 1898 founded the Peel Institute, to "advance the mental, physical, religious, moral and social education of persons and the promotion of facilities for the recreation or other leisure time occupation of those who by reason of age, youth, infirmity, disablement, poverty or social and economic circumstances are in need of such facilities, with the object of improving their conditions of life".

When the Metropolitan Borough of Finsbury was created in 1900, Gillett was elected to the first borough council, serving for six years. He was subsequently elected to the London County Council in 1910, representing East Finsbury as a member of the majority Progressive Party until 1922, and as an alderman from 1922 to 1925.

At the 1922 general election Gillett was nominated as the Labour Party's candidate to contest the Finsbury constituency. Although unsuccessful on this occasion, in the following year another general election was held and he became Finsbury's member of parliament. He held the seat at the 1924 1929 general elections. With the formation of the Second Labour Government in 1929 he received the post of Secretary for Overseas Trade in the Board of Trade.

When a National Government was formed in 1931, Gillett was one of the minority of Labour MPs who continued to support the premiership of Ramsay MacDonald, forming what became the National Labour Organisation. He held the seat for the National Government in the election of 1931, and was appointed Parliamentary Secretary to the Ministry of Transport. In the 1931 Dissolution Honours he was knighted. He was defeated by his Labour Party opponent, the Reverend George Saville Woods at the 1935 general election.

In 1936 he was appointed as Commissioner for the Special Areas in England and Wales. The "special areas" were localities of very high unemployment, and the commissioners were empowered to make grants to local authorities for works such as water supply and sewage works, hospitals and social amenities. Gillett retired from the post in May 1939 due to ill health. He died in August of the same year at his home in Letchworth, Hertfordshire.

== Family ==
Gillett married in 1898 Edith Mary Dixon, daughter of John Dixon MD.

Parliament of the United Kingdom
Preceded by Martin Archer-Shee	Member of Parliament for Finsbury; 1923–1935	Succeeded by George Woods
