= Andrew Lusk =

Scottish businessman and Liberal politician

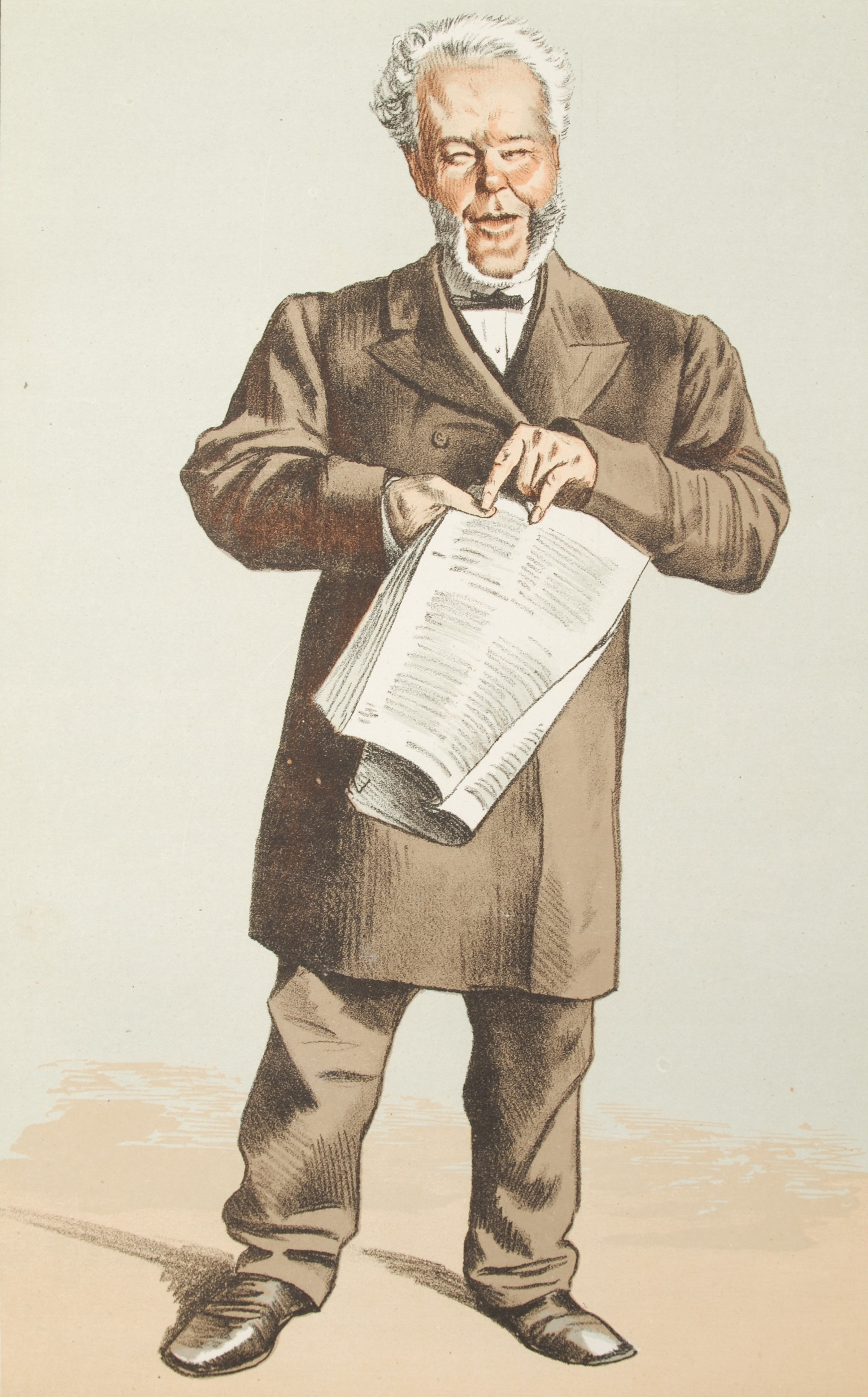
"Now I want to know" Lusk as caricatured by James Tissot in Vanity Fair, October 1871

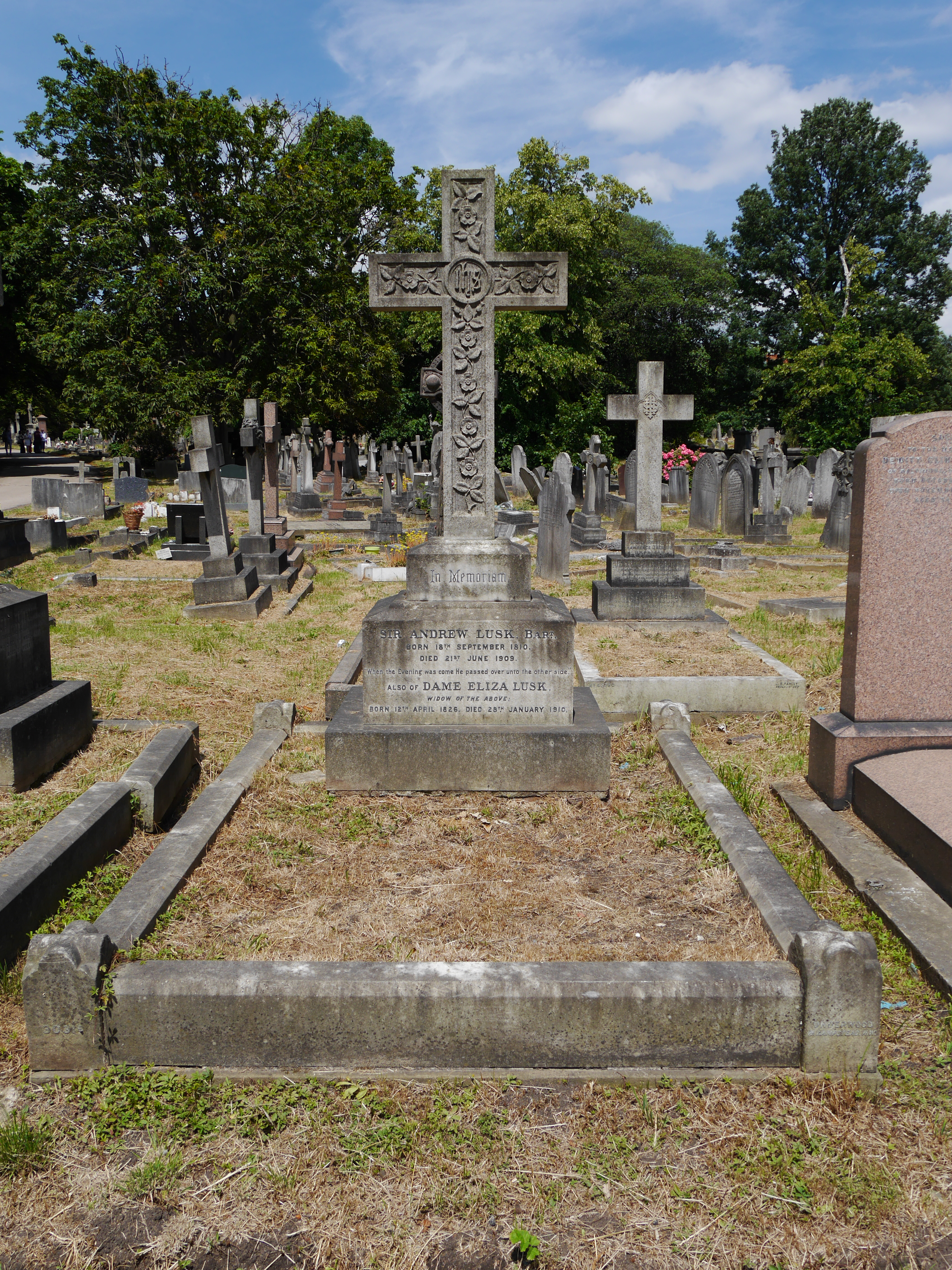
Funerary monument, Kensal Green Cemetery

Sir Andrew Lusk, 1st Baronet (18 September 1810 – 21 June 1909) was a Scottish businessman and Liberal politician. He sat in the House of Commons from 1865 to 1885.

== Biography ==
Lusk was the son of John Lusk of Barr, Ayrshire and his wife Margaret Earl. He was Presbyterian and entered business as a merchant and shipowner. He was active in the City of London where he was a director of the Imperial Bank and of the General Fire and Life Assurance Co. He was an alderman and Deputy Lieutenant for the City of London and a J.P. for Middlesex. From 1860 to 1861 he was Sheriff of London and Middlesex.

In 1865 Lusk was elected Member of Parliament for Finsbury. He held the seat until 1885. He was Lord Mayor of London in 1873/74 and was created a baronet, of Colney Park, on 4 August 1874 to commemorate the visit of the Emperor of Russia to the city. He was Chairman of the Trustees of Morden College from 1885 to 1896.

Lusk married Eliza Potter, daughter of James Potter of Falkirk, in 1848. He died on 21 June 1909, aged 98, when the baronetcy became extinct.

Parliament of the United Kingdom
Preceded by Sir Samuel Peto, Bt; William Cox	Member of Parliament for Finsbury; 1865–1885; With: William McCullagh Torrens	Constituency abolished
Civic offices
Preceded by Sir Sydney Waterlow, Bt	Lord Mayor of London; 1873 – 1874	Succeeded by David Henry Stone
Baronetage of the United Kingdom
New creation	Baronet (of Colney Park); 1874–1809	Extinct
