= Ever, Jane =

1993 video game

- Developer: 3 Turns Production
- Platform: Windows
- Release: September 14, 2016
- Genre: MMORPG

Ever, Jane: The Virtual World of Jane Austen was a massively multiplayer online role-playing game (MMORPG) developed by 3 Turns Production. It was inspired by the work of Jane Austen and the settings of her work.

== Gameplay ==
Ever, Jane puts players in a shared online world, where they can interact with player-characters and non-player characters alike. It is designed to be unlike traditional MMORPGs such as World of Warcraft, choosing to center its gameplay around romance and intrigue. Character statistics include Duty, Happiness, Kindness, Status, and Reputation. Players can join different families and can choose what social hierarchy and titles they have. Players can attempt to invite characters to different events, and their social standing is affected by the response. If the character is of a higher status and declines the invitation, it hurts players' social standing. It will increase if they accept, though whether it was done because of Duty or Happiness determines the size of the increase. Settings players attend balls and dinner parties where they can interact with player-characters and non-player characters. Mini-games are also included, such as fishing, sewing, hunting, and piano playing. Some of these mini-games are gender specific; hunting can only be participated in by men, and sewing by women. The game features a free-to-play model but also allows players to subscribe for additional content. This model was planned to be changed to either a one-time payment or a $5 per month.

Characters from Jane Austen's novels appear in Ever, Jane as non-playable characters that players may interact with.

== Development ==
Ever, Jane was developed by 3 Turns Production, with Judy Tyrer serving as lead developer. It was produced by Renee Nejo. Development of Ever, Jane began following Tyrer scrapping another project and becoming inspired to make it while reading the book "Sense and Sensibility." They also felt discouraged by MMORPGs moving away from role-playing and more into action, and wanted to make something dedicated to roleplaying. Tyrer aspired for Ever, Jane to be as historically accurate to the period the game is set in as possible, noting the promiscuity of people in that time behind closed doors. She sought to have this reproduced by private messaging. Promiscuity would be allowed in private discussion, but not public. People who violate this rule would be sent to a location called Botany Bay, though it was not implemented at the game's launch. Botany Bay was conceived as an alternative to banning in order to avoid angry players. While researching for the game, she discovered a number of relatively obscure historical facts, such as the presence of black people in the Merchant Gentry across Regency England and Austen's status as an abolitionist. Tyrer found evidence of historical whitewashing, and used this historical information to allow players to choose different skin colors without it being regarded as historically inaccurate. Skin color was not a customization option at launch, but it was intended for inclusion at a later date. Some video game inspirations for Ever, Jane include World of Warcraft, EVE Online, and A Tale in the Desert. When determining payment models, Tyrer wanted to avoid microtransactions being required to reasonably progress in the game, but she needed to have some payment models such as subscriptions as an option in order to pay for the servers.

Its game engine was Unity 4.6, while its networking library was uLink. They worked with Symas Corporation to get LDAP provided as a database for the game. A significant portion of the game's design was the product of three people: an artist, a programmer/designer, and a part-time content expert As of September 9, 2016, the staff consisted of four full-time members and five part-time members, excluding employees who work in legal, accounting, and music areas.

A Kickstarter was created to seek funding for the project, asking for $100,000. A prototype version of the game was released alongside the Kickstarter. A few days after the Kickstarter began, the project had earned more than $36,000. Tyrer expected that polish and "sufficient content" would lead to the game being released about a full year after September 2016. It secured its $110,000 funding in December 2013. It entered beta in August 2016, with approximately a few hundred players overall and 30 players online at any given time. During the beta, most of Ever, Jane's players were women, particularly those who enjoyed literature. Engadget writer Jessica Conditt speculated that the reason for this is because the game depicts a "real-life society that paints women as more emotionally aware." Tyrer had a desire to provide a game that could appeal to women. She was funding the game herself during this period, but hoped that she could get outside funding. She felt that the beta was weak owing to the lack of funding and staff. In an interview, Tyrer discusses the Kickstarter campaign and how it taught her that one has to keep their calendar open in order to devote their time and attention to it.

Ever, Jane's servers were shut down on December 20, 2020 due to a shortage of funds.

== Reception ==
USA Today writer Whitney Matheson included it in their list of suggestions of projects for people to fund on Kickstarter, expressing interest due to its literary focus. Vice writer Miellyn Fitzwater Barrows noted that the concept of romance being the primary genre of an MMORPG was an unprecedented thing, with author James Batchelor regarding it as among the best non-violent video games. He found the use of gossip as a means to attack others interesting.
