= Robert Spankie =

Robert Spankie (17 April 1774 – 2 November 1842) was a Scottish-born journalist, barrister and politician who spent most of his career and life in England and India.

Born in Falkland, Fife, he was the son of a Church of Scotland minister. He entered the University of St Andrews but left without graduating, moving to London in about 1792. He became a reporter for the Morning Chronicle, rising to be the editor. In 1803 he left journalism and became a law student at the Inner Temple in 1803, and was called to the bar in 1808. Following his marriage to Euphemia Inglis, daughter of an East India Company director in 1813, he pursued a legal career in India. In 1817 he became Advocate-General of Bengal. He returned to England in 1823 due to illness.

He resumed his legal practice from his home in Russell Square, London, and became a serjeant-at-law in 1824 and a king's serjeant in 1832.

At the 1832 general election Spankie was elected as one of two members of parliament for the new London constituency of Finsbury, enfranchised under the Reform Act 1832. Elected as Liberal, in parliament he took a distinctly Conservative line, leading to his defeat at the next election in 1835. He subsequently stood as a Conservative candidate at Bury in 1837 without success.

He continued his legal practice, becoming standing counsel for the East India Company. He died at his London home in 1842 aged 68.

Parliament of the United Kingdom
New constituency	Member of Parliament for Finsbury; 1832–1835; With: Robert Grant (until 1834); Thomas Slingsby Duncombe (1834–1835)	Succeeded by Thomas Slingsby Duncombe; Thomas Wakley
