= William McCullagh Torrens =

Irish Liberal politician

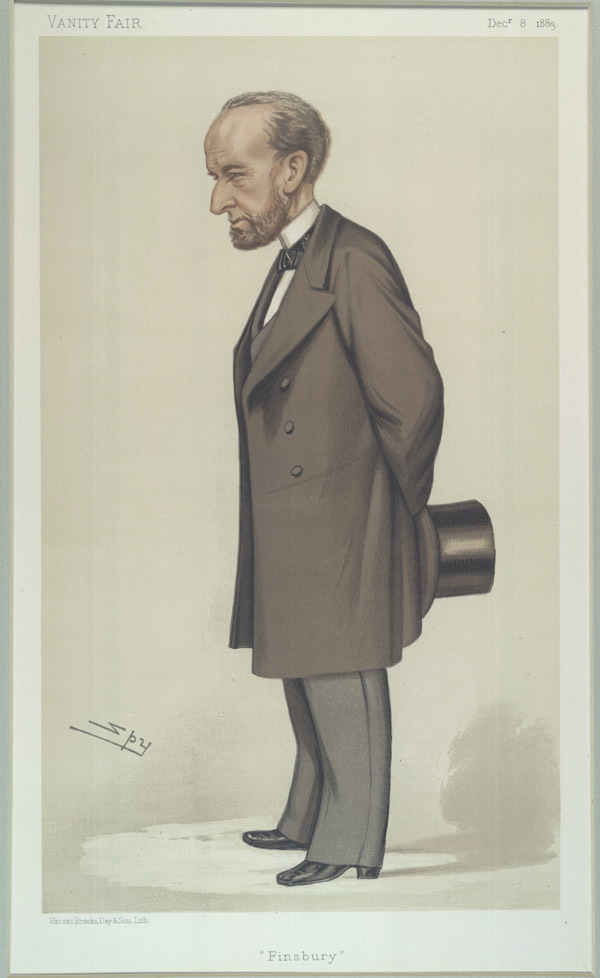
"Finsbury". Caricature by Spy published in Vanity Fair in 1883.

William Torrens McCullagh Torrens (13 October 1813 – 26 April 1894) was an Irish Liberal politician, who sat in the House of Commons for various constituencies between 1848 and 1885.

== Life ==
Torrens was the son of James McCullagh of Greenfield, Dublin, and his wife Jane Torrens, daughter of Andrew Torrens of Dublin. He was educated at Trinity College, Dublin. In 1835 he was Assistant Commissioner of the Irish Poor Inquiry and was called to the bar in Ireland in 1836. He was an original member of the Anti-Corn Law League founded in 1838. In 1846 he was private secretary to Henry Labouchere when he was Chief Secretary for Ireland.

Torrens stood for parliament unsuccessfully at Dundalk in 1847 but was seated as Member of Parliament on petition in March 1848. He held the seat until 1852 when he stood unsuccessfully for Yarmouth.

Torrens was called to the bar at Lincoln's Inn in 1855. He was elected MP for Yarmouth in 1857 but his election was declared void on petition. In 1863 he adopted the additional surname Torrens. In 1865 he was elected MP for Finsbury. He held the seat until 1885. He introduced in 1866 the "Artisans and Labourers Dwelling Bill" and carried the lodger franchise in the Reform Act 1867. He obtained a Select Committee on Extradition in 1869 and in 1874 brought in and carried the Building Societies Bill.

Torrens died at the age of 80 after being knocked down by a hansom cab.

== Works ==
Torrens published a number of works including

- Lectures on the Use and Study of History
- Life of Lord Melbourne
- Industrial History of Free Nations
- Empire in Asia
- Memoirs of Wellesley

== Family ==
Torrens married firstly Margaret Henrietta Gray daughter of John Gray of Claremorris, County Mayo in 1836. She died in 1873 and he married secondly Emily Harrison, daughter of William Harrison of Leamington in 1878.

Parliament of the United Kingdom
Preceded by Charles Carroll MacTavish	Member of Parliament for Dundalk; 1848–1852	Succeeded by Sir George Bowyer, Bt
Preceded by Charles Rumbold; Sir Edmund Lacon	Member of Parliament for Great Yarmouth; March 1857 – August 1857; With: Edward Watkin	Succeeded by John Mellor; Adolphus William Young
Preceded by William Cox; Samuel Morton Peto	Member of Parliament for Finsbury; 1865–1885; With: Sir Andrew Lusk	Constituency abolished
