= Martin Archer-Shee =

British politician

Lieutenant-Colonel Sir Martin Archer-Shee CMG DSO

Member of Parliament for Finsbury
- In office 15 December 1918 – 6 December 1923
- Preceded by: Constituency established
- Succeeded by: Sir George Gillett

Member of Parliament for Finsbury Central
- In office 10 February 1910 – 25 November 1918
- Preceded by: William Charles Steadman
- Succeeded by: Constituency abolished

Personal details
- Born: 5 May 1873
- Died: 6 January 1935 (aged 61)
- Party: Conservative
- Relations: Alfred Shipley Pell (grandfather)
- Education: The Oratory School; RMC Sandhurst

Military service
- Branch/service: British Army; (United Kingdom of Great Britain and Ireland) Royal Navy
- Years of service: 1886–1918
- Rank: Lieutenant-Colonel
- Commands: 12th (Service) Battalion, Gloucestershire Regiment (Bristol's Own); 2/4th Battalion, York and Lancaster Regiment; 10th Battalion, King's Own Scottish Borderers
- Battles/wars: Second Boer War (POW); First World War

Sir Martin Archer-Shee CMG DSO (5 May 1873 – 6 January 1935) was a British army officer and Conservative Party politician.

== Background ==
He was the son of Martin Archer-Shee (1846–1913) and his wife Elizabeth Edith Dennistoun (1851–1890) (née Pell) of New York who married in 1872 at Piccadilly. His maternal grandfather was the American insurance executive Alfred Shipley Pell. His father was a bank manager of the Bank of England, was the grandson of the painter Martin Archer Shee. His half-brother was George Archer-Shee, whose notable acquittal of the accusation of theft became the basis of the play The Winslow Boy by Terence Rattigan.

== Royal Navy ==
Archer-Shee was educated at The Oratory School before entering the Royal Navy as a cadet in 1886. After two years on the training ship HMS Britannia he became a midshipman on HMS Agincourt, part of the Channel Fleet, later transferring to HMS Cleopatra. He later joined The Castaways' Club to keep in touch with his former service.

== Boer War ==
In 1890 he resigned from the navy in order to enter the Royal Military College Sandhurst and to become an officer in the British Army. He obtained a commission as second lieutenant in the 19th Hussars on 15 March 1893, and was promoted to lieutenant on 7 February 1897. He served in the Second Boer War 1899–1902, where he took part in operations in Natal, including the defence of Ladysmith, then in the Transvaal from July to November 1900. The award of the Distinguished Service Order (DSO) (dated 29 November 1900) for his services during the early part of the war, was announced in the September 1901 South African Honours list.

In February 1902, he was wounded near Kromdraal when he captured enemy soldiers (mentioned in dispatches 25 April 1902), and he was invalided home in May that year, shortly before the official end of hostilities.

Following the war he was promoted to captain on 15 August 1902, and received the rank of brevet major a week later on 22 August 1902. He resigned from the army in 1905.

In the same year he married Frances Pell (1878-1959), born in Manhattan to Alfred Walden and Mary Kirkland (Tracy) Pell. Frances's aunt Frances Louisa Tracy married the banker J. P. Morgan. At their wedding in Highland Falls, New York, Morgan gave the bride away. Franklin Delano Roosevelt attended the wedding.

Martin and Frances Archer-Shee had seven children:

- John Pell Archer-Shee, 1906–1980.
- Richard Martin Archer-Shee, 1907–1963.
- Edith Frances Archer-Shee, 1908–1989.
- Kathleen Winifred Archer-Shee, 1908–1985.
- Lucy Mary Archer-Shee, 1910–1988.
- Philip Archer-Shee, 1911–1993
- Robert Alfred Archer-Shee, 1912–1988.

== Member of Parliament for Finsbury Central ==
At the January 1910 general election he was elected to the House of Commons as the Member of Parliament (MP) for Finsbury Central, winning the seat for the Conservatives and unseating the Liberal-Labour MP, W. C. Steadman. In parliament he was an advocate of Tariff Reform and argued for the case for an enlargement of the navy.

Archer-Shee was able to use his political connections to secure the services of Edward Carson in the court case involving his half-brother, George.

== First World War ==
With the outbreak of war in 1914, Archer-Shee rejoined the army. He was promoted to lieutenant-colonel, and commanded three different infantry battalions during the conflict: the 12th (Service) Battalion, Gloucestershire Regiment (Bristol's Own), the 2/4th Battalion York and Lancaster Regiment and the 10th Battalion King's Own Scottish Borderers. He was mentioned in dispatches four times, and was made a Companion of the Order of St Michael and St George for his services. Following an altercation in Parliament, Noel Pemberton Billing offered Archer-Shee a duel by boxing in public for charity; Archer-Shee declined.

== Member of Parliament for Finsbury ==
At the 1918 general election Archer-Shee was elected MP for the new constituency of Finsbury, parliamentary boundaries having been altered by the Representation of the People Act 1918. He held the seat at the 1922 general election, and was knighted in the 1923 Birthday Honours. He was defeated in 1923 by his Labour Party opponent, George Masterman Gillett. He attempted to re-enter parliament in the following year, but failed to be elected at Peckham. This was to be his last electoral contest: although his name was proposed when a vacancy occurred at Fulham East in 1933, he chose not to stand in the ensuing by-election.

Archer-Shee died at his home Ashurst Lodge, Sunninghill, Berkshire in January 1935, aged 61, after a long illness. Following a requiem mass at South Ascot Friary he was buried in Sunninghill.

== Arms ==
Coat of arms of Martin Archer-Shee
Notes Confirmed 30 January 1926 by Sir Nevile Rodwell Wilkinson, Ulster King of Arms. Crest On wreaths of the colours 1st a swan with wings addorsed Sable beaked Or 2nd a centaur Proper armed with a bow and arrow. Escutcheon Quarterly 1st & 4th per bend indented Or and Azure two fleurs-de-lys counterchanged (Shee) 2nd & 3rd Azure three arrows Argent (Archer). Motto Vincit Veritas

Parliament of the United Kingdom
Preceded by William Charles Steadman	Member of Parliament for Finsbury Central; 1910–1918	Constituency abolished
New constituency	Member of Parliament for Finsbury; 1918–1923	Succeeded by George Gillett
