= Thomas Challis =

British businessman and Liberal politician

Thomas Challis (1 July 1794 – 20 August 1874) was a British businessman and Liberal Party politician who held office as a Member of Parliament and as Lord Mayor of London.

Born in the City of London, he was a hide merchant with business premises in the Bermondsey area of south London, and also was a skin broker in Finsbury.

Challis was elected an alderman for Cripplegate Ward in 1844, an office he held until his death aged 80, when he was the senior member of the court of aldermen of the City of London. In 1846-47 he held the office of Sheriff of London and Middlesex and was Lord Mayor of London in 1856–57.

A member of the Worshipful Company of Butchers, he was master of the company in 1839.

In June 1852 a general election was called and a group of 500 electors in the Clerkenwell area presented a petition to Challis requesting that he stand for election to parliament for the constituency of Finsbury. He consented to become a candidate, declaring that if elected he would "exercise his own judgement, and, opposing all class legislation, he should make truth the basis of his conduct, and the happiness of the people his object." There were three candidates for the two-seat constituency, and Challis was elected along with his fellow Liberal, Thomas Slingsby Duncombe. He served a single term, standing down at the next general election in 1857.

On Michaelmas Day 1852 Challis was elected by the Corporation of London as Lord Mayor of London. He took office on 9 November, although the traditional Lord Mayor's Show was not held as the City was preparing to hold the state funeral of the Duke of Wellington.

He died at his country home in Enfield, Middlesex, and was buried at Enfield Chase Cemetery.

Civic offices
Preceded by William Hunter	Lord Mayor of the City of London; 1852	Succeeded by Thomas Sidney
Parliament of the United Kingdom
Preceded by Thomas Wakley; Thomas Slingsby Duncombe	Member of Parliament for Finsbury; 1852–1857; With: Thomas Slingsby Duncombe	Succeeded by Thomas Slingsby Duncombe; William Cox
