= Thomas Henry Wakley =

English surgeon and journalist (1821–1907)

- Born: 21 March 1821; London
- Died: 5 April 1907 (aged 86)
- Occupations: Surgeon and journalist

Thomas Henry Wakley (21 March 1821 – 5 April 1907) was an English surgeon and journalist.

== Biography ==
Wakley was the eldest son of Thomas Wakley. He was born in London on 21 March 1821. With a view to taking holy orders, he was educated, preparatory to matriculation at Oxford, by a private tutor, the Rev. James Basnett Mills, a son of a partner in the printing firm Mills & Jowett, who printed the 'Lancet' in its early days. Wakley resided in Oxford for a short time without matriculating; as the son of a prominent radical, he probably found the atmosphere uncongenial. Then entering the University of London, he took up medicine at University College. Among his teachers were Samuel Cooper, Robert Liston, Richard Quain, and Erasmus Wilson; the last named coached him privately. Continuing his medical studies in Paris, he there not only attended surgical lectures and clinics, but also devoted much time to music and singing under Garcia and Ronconi. In 1845 he became M.R.C.S., and in 1848 was elected assistant surgeon to the Royal Free Hospital. Taking a house in Guilford Street near the hospital, he filled the position of an informal casualty surgeon. As a young untried man, nearly all of whose studies had been pursued abroad, he incurred the hostility of his father's enemies, who held his appointment to be a breach of principles of hospital administration which his father's newspaper, the 'Lancet,' was vigorously upholding against abuses. Wakley was accused of malpraxis in treating a child for fracture complicated with scarlet fever, and an action was brought against him. In spite of the mental strain, he passed the examination for the fellowship of the College of Surgeons on 6 December 1849, four days before the trial came on. The jury found a verdict for Wakley without leaving the box. Wakley soon moved to No. 7 Arlington Street, where for many years he practised as a consulting surgeon. As a surgeon his name is chiefly associated with the invention of a form of urethral dilator and with the use of glycerine in the treatment of affections of the external auditory canal (cf. Clinical Reports on the Use of Glycerine, ed. W. T. Robertson, 1851).

In 1857 his father made him and his youngest brother, James Goodchild Wakley, part proprietors of the 'Lancet,' with a share in the management. In 1862 the father died. The youngest son, James, became editor, while Thomas maintained an active interest in its conduct. Until 1882, when he retired from practice, he pursued the double occupation of consulting surgeon and journalist. Upon the death of James Wakley in 1886 he assumed the editorship in association with his son Thomas. Thenceforth, until near his death, he devoted himself to his journalistic duties. Although he lacked the training of a journalist, he was a practical and shrewd editor, and maintained the position of the paper. The active management devolved in course of time on his son, but Wakley always kept in his own hands the 'Lancet' relief fund to meet accidental distresses of medical practitioners and their families, which he and his son founded and financed from 1889. To the last he helped to direct the Hospital Sunday Fund, which had been virtually founded by his brother. He manifested his interest in Epsom College for the sons of medical men by a donation in 1902 of 1000l. in the name of the proprietors of the 'Lancet.'

Wakley's energy was unbounded. When young he was a fine runner; he hunted until late in life, was a good shot, and fond of fishing. He died on 5 April 1907 of cardiac failure and senile decay, his last illness being practically his first. Wakley married in 1850 Harriette Anne, third daughter of Francis Radford Blake of Rickmansworth. She survived him, with a son, Thomas [see infra], and a daughter, Amy Florence.

Wakley wrote little. An article on diseases of the joints in Samuel Cooper's 'Dictionary of Practical Surgery' (new ed. revised by S. A. Lane, 1872) is the most important of his publications.

Wakley's only son, Thomas Wakley (1851–1909), born in London on 10 July 1851, was educated at Westminster School and at Trinity College, Cambridge, where he studied medicine but took no degree. After he left Cambridge a serious bicycle accident interrupted his medical studies for some six years, but having entered St. Thomas's Hospital he became L.R.C.P. in 1883. Thenceforth he worked in the 'Lancet' office, first as assistant to his uncle, James Wakley, then as editor, later on his uncle's death in 1886 as joint-editor with his father, and finally as sole editor in succession to his father. A good amateur actor, a prominent freemason, and a numismatist, he died on 5 March 1909 of a gradually progressive hepatitis. He married in 1903 Gladys Muriel, daughter of Mr. Norman Barron, by whom he left one son, Thomas.
