= Budworth =

Budworth may refer to:

People:

- Charles Budworth (1869–1921), British artillery officer
- Neil Budworth (born 1982), English rugby league footballer
- Richard Budworth (1867–1937), English rugby union forward
- William Budworth (1699–1745), schoolmaster at Brewood in Staffordshire, England

Places:

- Aston by Budworth, civil parish in the unitary authority of Cheshire East and the ceremonial county of Cheshire, England
- Great Budworth, civil parish and village in the unitary authority of Cheshire West and Chester and the ceremonial county of Cheshire, England
- Little Budworth, civil parish and village in the unitary authority of Cheshire West and Chester and the ceremonial county of Cheshire, England
