= Benjamin Collins Brodie =

Benjamin Collins Brodie may refer to:

- Sir Benjamin Collins Brodie, 1st Baronet (1783–1862), English physiologist and surgeon
- Sir Benjamin Collins Brodie, 2nd Baronet (1817–1880), English chemist

== See also ==
- Ben Collins (disambiguation)
