= William Cox (British politician) =

British politician (1817–1889)

William Cox (1817 – 12 December 1889) was a British solicitor and Liberal Party politician.

Cox qualified as a solicitor in 1840 and became a member of the Common Council of the City of London in 1851. In 1857 he was chosen as a candidate to contest the two-seat constituency of Finsbury as a Whig and supporter of the policy of Lord Palmerston. The election was held on 29 March, and Cox was elected, coming second of the four candidates, with a majority of 156 votes over the third-placed candidate.

When a further general election was called in 1859, Cox found himself opposed by two other Liberal candidates. He lost his seat, with The Standard noting satirically that:

"...the honourable gentleman neither spared his lungs nor his powers of sitting out the most long-winded debate... He had almost arrived at the distinction of being called a bore... Happily for his peace, his health, and his pocket, his too Liberal career has been stopped by an oblivious constituency".

On 13 November 1861 one of the sitting members of parliament for Finsbury, Thomas Slingsby Duncombe, died. On 9 December Cox announced that he would seek election in the resulting by-election. The by-election was held on 16 December, and Cox defeated his only opponent, J R Mills by 42 votes.

Cox held the seat until the next general election in July 1865. He was one of four Liberal candidates who, along with a lone Conservative, contested the seat. He failed to be re-elected, finishing in third place with 5,008 votes, more than 2,800 behind the second-placed candidate.

Between c.1861 and c.1868 Cox commissioned a house to be built in the village of Netteswell, Essex. The house was called 'Spurriers'. Cox lived in the house until his death in December 1889 aged 72. William Cox is buried in the parish of St Andrew's churchyard, Netteswell, Harlow.

Parliament of the United Kingdom
Preceded by Thomas Challis; Thomas Slingsby Duncombe	Member of Parliament for Finsbury; 1857–1859; With: Thomas Slingsby Duncombe	Succeeded by Thomas Slingsby Duncombe; Samuel Morton Peto
Preceded by Morton Peto; Thomas Slingsby Duncombe	Member of Parliament for Finsbury; 1861–1865; With: Morton Peto	Succeeded by William McCullagh Torrens; Sir Andrew Lusk
