= Thomas Wakley =

English surgeon and social reformer (1795–1862)

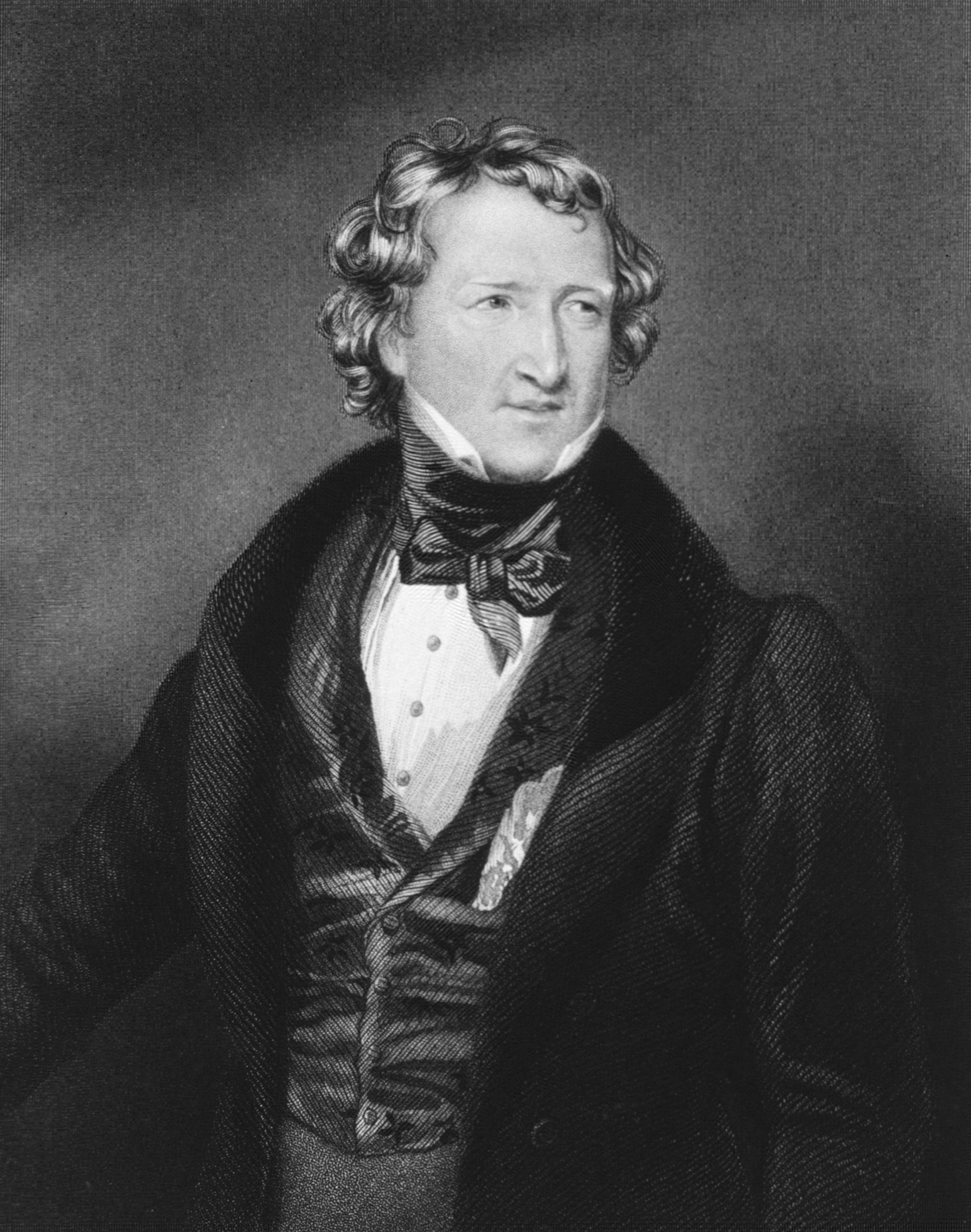
Thomas Wakley

Thomas Wakley (11 July 1795 – 16 May 1862) was an English surgeon. He gained fame as a social reformer who campaigned against incompetence, privilege and nepotism. He was the founding editor of The Lancet, a radical Member of Parliament (MP) of the Liberal Party and a celebrated coroner.

== Early life ==
He was born in Membury, Devon, to a prosperous farmer, Henry Wakley (1750 – 26 August 1842), and his wife, Mary née Minifie. His father inherited property, leased neighbouring land and became a large farmer by the standards of the day and a government Commissioner on the Enclosure of Waste Land. He was described as a "just but severe parent" and, with his wife, had eleven children, eight sons and three daughters. Thomas was the youngest son, and attended the grammar school at Chard (now Chard School), then Taunton Grammar School.

When he was eleven, he sailed on a ship captained by a family friend to Calcutta. He joined the ship on 7 March 1807 as one of six midshipmen. He was discharged on 18 August 1808. When he returned, he attended school at Wiveliscombe, Somerset. At fifteen, he was apprenticed to a Taunton apothecary and then later to surgeons in Beaminster and Henley-on-Thames. Young Wakley was a sportsman and a boxer: he fought bare-fisted in public houses.

In 1815, he then went to London, where he attended anatomy classes at St Thomas's Hospital, and enrolled in the United Hospitals of St. Thomas's Hospital and Guy's. The dominant personality at these two hospitals was Sir Astley Cooper FRS (1768–1841). He also studied at a private anatomy college on Webb Street, run by Richard and Edward Grainger. Wakley qualified as a Member of the Royal College of Surgeons (MRCS) in 1817.

A surgeon at 22, he set up in practice in Regent Street and in 1820 married Elizabeth Goodchild, whose father was a merchant and a governor of St Thomas' Hospital. They had three sons and a daughter, who died young. His eldest son, Henry Membury Wakley, became a barrister and sat as deputy coroner under his father. His youngest son, James Goodchild Wakley, and his middle son, Thomas Henry Wakley, became joint editors of The Lancet.

All through his career, Wakley proved to be a man of aggressive personality, and his experiences had a sensational beginning. In August 1820 a gang of men (reputedly, the Thistlewood gang) that had some imagined grievance against him burnt down his house and severely wounded him in a murderous assault. The whole affair is obscure. The assault may have been a follow-up to the Cato Street conspiracy, whose supporters believed (wrongly) that the hangman was a surgeon. Wakley was indirectly accused by the insurance company, which had refused his claim, of setting fire to his house himself. He won his case against the company.

== Lancet years ==
In 1823, he started the now well-known medical weekly, The Lancet, with William Cobbett, William Lawrence, James Wardrop and a libel lawyer as associates. It was extremely successful: by 1830, it had a circulation of about 4,000. In 1828, one of his accounts of medical negligence accused Bransby Cooper (the nephew of Sir Astley Cooper, the General Surgeon) of incompetence in causing a patient immense suffering as he attempted to extract a bladder stone through a cut beneath the scrotum. Such operations were regularly completed in only a minute's time by excellent surgeons such as the previous century's William Cheselden, but Cooper took more than an hour and was seen to have great difficulty in locating the stone. The magazine account led to a libel case, Cooper v Wakley, which would raise the profile and popular prestige of Wakley and his magazine. The court found in Cooper's favor, but awarded him much smaller damages than requested, which was generally taken as an acknowledgment that Wakley's accusations of incompetence and nepotism were justified.

At first, the editor of the Lancet was not named in the journal, but after a few weeks, rumours began to circulate. After the journal began printing the content of Sir Astley Cooper's lectures without permission, the great man paid a surprise visit to his former pupil to discover Wakley correcting the proofs of the next issue. Upon recognising each other, they fell immediately into laughter or perhaps an altercation. Either way, they reached an agreement that was mutually satisfactory.

The libel lawyer was certainly needed for a series of attacks on the jobbery in vogue among the medical practitioners of the day. In opposition to the hospital surgeons and physicians, he published reports of their lectures and exposed their malpractices. He had to fight a number of lawsuits, but they only increased his influence. He attacked the whole constitution of the Royal College of Surgeons and obtained so much support from among the general body of the profession, now roused to a sense of the abuses that he exposed, that in 1827, a petition to Parliament resulted in a return being ordered of the public money granted to it.

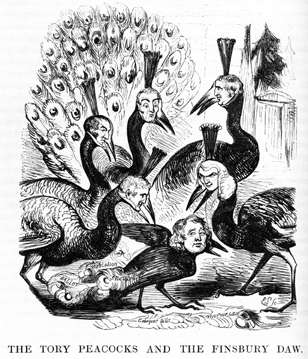
Wakley as Jackdaw plucking feathers from the peacocks of his times. Punch 1841

Wakley's campaigning was rough and outspoken:

[We deplore the] "state of society which allows various sets of mercenary, goose-brained monopolists and charlatans to usurp the highest privileges.... This is the canker-worm which eats into the heart of the medical body"

— Wakley, The Lancet 1838–39, 1, p 2–3.

"The Council of the College of Surgeons remains an irresponsible, unreformed monstrosity in the midst of English institutions – an antediluvian relic of all... that is most despotic and revolting, iniquitous and insulting, on the face of the Earth".

— Wakley, The Lancet 1841–42, 2, p 246.

He was especially severe on whomever he regarded as quacks. The English Homeopathic Association were "an audacious set of quacks" and its supporters "noodles and knaves, the noodles forming the majority, and the knaves using them as tools".

=== London College of Medicine ===
One of Wakley's best ideas came in 1831, when a series of massive meetings were held to launch a rival to the Royal Colleges. Though successful, not eventually unsuccessful, and the LCM incorporated ideas that formed the basis of reforms in the charters of the main licensing bodies, the Apothecaries, the Royal Colleges of Surgeons and Physicians. Firstly, there was to be one Faculty: the LCM was to include physicians, surgeons and general practitioners; teachers at private medical schools and naval surgeons would also be included. Secondly, the structure was to be democratic: there would be no restrictions by religion (e.g. the Anglican restrictions of Oxford and Cambridge Universities) or by institution (e.g. membership of hospitals). Its officers and Senate would be decided by annual ballot. The cost of diplomas would be set low; those already qualified would be eligible to become Fellows so, for instance, those qualified in Scotland would be received without re-examination. Appointments to official (public) positions were to be by merit, eliminating nepotism and the hand-placing of protégées. All Fellows would carry the prefix 'Dr', removing artificial divisions between members.

Perhaps not surprisingly, the LCM did not succeed against the united opposition of the established Colleges and other institutions. Nevertheless, the strong case for reform had been made in the most public manner. Subsequent legislation and reforms in governing charters were, for many years, influenced by this campaign.

=== Miscellany ===
In its early years, the Lancet also had other content of a non-medical kind. There was a chess column, the earliest regular chess column in any weekly periodical: The Chess Table. There were also occasional articles on politics, theatre reviews, biographies of non-medical persons, excerpts of material in other publications &c. None of that diminished its huge impact on surgery, hospitals and the Royal Colleges, which were opened up to public view as never before. Wakley also played a leading role in the reform of the London Veterinary College and the creation of the Society of Coroners. In addition to his work on The Lancet he also published a number of pamphlets and short guides, including "The Mother's Medical Adviser", published by Wilson and Company, New York, 1844.

== Member of Parliament ==
Reform in the College of Surgeons was slow, and Wakley now set himself to rouse the House of Commons from within. He became a radical candidate for Parliament and in 1835 was returned for Finsbury; he retained his seat till 1852. Even after his departure, his work was largely responsible for the content of the Medical Act 1858. He spoke in the House of Commons against the Poor Laws, police bills, newspaper tax and Lord's Day observance and for Chartism, Tolpuddle Martyrs, free trade, Irish nationalism and, of course, medical reform. All the topics were vigorously debated and fought over, for the 1830s was a turbulent decade; the origin of the difficulties lay in the massively expensive Napoleonic Wars, and in the inherent injustice of the way British law and Parliament operated.

The Chartist demands were

1. 1. Universal suffrage for adult men
2. 2. Annual Parliaments
3. 3. Payment for members of Parliament
4. 4. Abolition of property qualifications for candidates
5. 5. Vote by ballot (i.e. secret voting)
6. 6. Abolition of rotten boroughs (rough equalisation of electoral districts).

Apart from annual Parliaments, these were achieved, but it took time. The effect was to give ordinary citizens a direct say in how the country was governed. Wakley was one of many campaigners; his influence was greater than most because he was now inside Parliament.

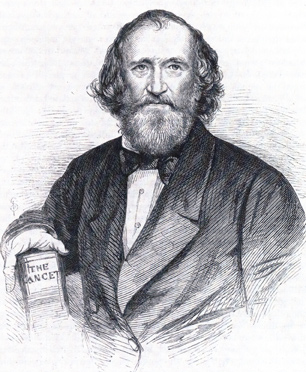
Wakley in old age. Illustrated London News 1862

As an Anglican and a regular church-goer, Wakley's opposition to aspects of the Lord's Day Observance legislation was based not on secularism but on his sympathy for the ordinary man. In his day, men worked a full six days each week and could not shop on pay nights. If all shops closed for the whole of Sunday, it was clearly unfair to working men. Also, he advocated that places of education, such as museums and zoos, should be open to all on Sundays. The working week became five days long around 1960, and it was even later before shops were able to open on Sundays.

== Medical coroner ==
Wakley also argued for medical coronerships, and when they were established, he was elected Coroner for West Middlesex in 1839. Consistent with his views, he held inquests into all sudden deaths, including deaths in police custody. He was indefatigable in upholding the interests of the working classes and advocating humanitarian reforms as well as in pursuing his campaign against medical restrictions and abuses, and he made the Lancet not only a professional organ but a powerful engine of social reform. During his term as coroner he held between 25,000 and 30,000 investigations, sometimes delegating responsibility to his son Henry Membury Wakley. Charles Dickens, a frequent guest at Wakley's dinner table, is said to have derived material for "Oliver Twist" from Wakley (inquest on Eliza Burgess, held St. Marylebone Workhouse, January 1840) and was juror on more than one Wakley inquest. Details of many of his cases are held in the reference sections of a number of north and west London reference and local history libraries under the collective title of "Coroner Wakley's Casebook", a series of books published by C. B. Wakley between 2015 and 2017.

=== Flogging ===
Wakley campaigned against flogging as a punishment for many years. Deaths from flogging in the British Army were not unknown and not surprising when one reads the details. Wakley was Coroner when Private James White, after committing a disciplinary offence, was subjected to 150 lashes of the cat-o'-nine-tails in the 7th Hussars in 1846 and died a month later after symptoms of "serious cardiac and pulmonary mischief" were followed by pleurisy and pneumonia. The army doctors, under direct pressure from the colonel of the regiment, signed the certificate saying "cause of death was in no way connected with the corporal punishment." Before burial, the vicar communicated with Wakley, who issued a warrant for an inquest. Evidence was given by the Army surgeons, by the hospital physician and orderlies and by independent experts. In the event, it was the evidence of Erasmus Wilson, consulting surgeon to the St Pancras Infirmary, who made it clear that the flogging and the death were causally connected. The jury concurred and added a strongly worded rider that expressed their "horror and disgust that the law of the land provided that the revolting punishment of flogging should be permitted upon British soldiers." Sprigge added that it was not Wilson's able scientific arguments that convinced the jury, but it was his assertion that had it not been for the flogging, White would be alive. The Army Act 1881 abolished flogging as a punishment.

=== Adulteration of foodstuffs ===
Wakley's last campaigns were against the adulteration of foodstuffs. This was common in Wakley's day, and his opposition was significant in bringing about much-needed reforming legislation. To provide evidence, Wakley set up The Lancet Analytical and Sanitary Commission, which provided 'records of the microscopical and chemical analyses of the solids and fluids consumed by all classes of the public'. The methods were devised by Wakley, Sir William Brooke O'Shaughnessy and Dr Arthur Hill Hassall, who was the Commissioner.

The first investigation showed that "it is a fact that coffee is largely adulterated". Of 34 coffees, 31 were adulterated; the three exceptions were of higher price. The main adulteration was chicory, otherwise bean-flour, potato-flour or roasted corn was used. Moreover, it was found that chicory itself was usually adulterated. The Lancet published the names of the genuine traders and threatened the others with exposure if they failed to mend their ways. A second report (26 April 1851) actually carried out the threat. A third report showed that canister coffee was even more adulterated. Investigations of sugar, pepper, bread, tobacco and tea followed, then finally the purity of the water supply. The first Adulteration Act became law in 1860, the second in 1872. The Sale of Food and Drugs Act 1875 and the Sale of Food and Drugs Act 1879 followed. All was achieved by Wakley and his associates.

== Death ==
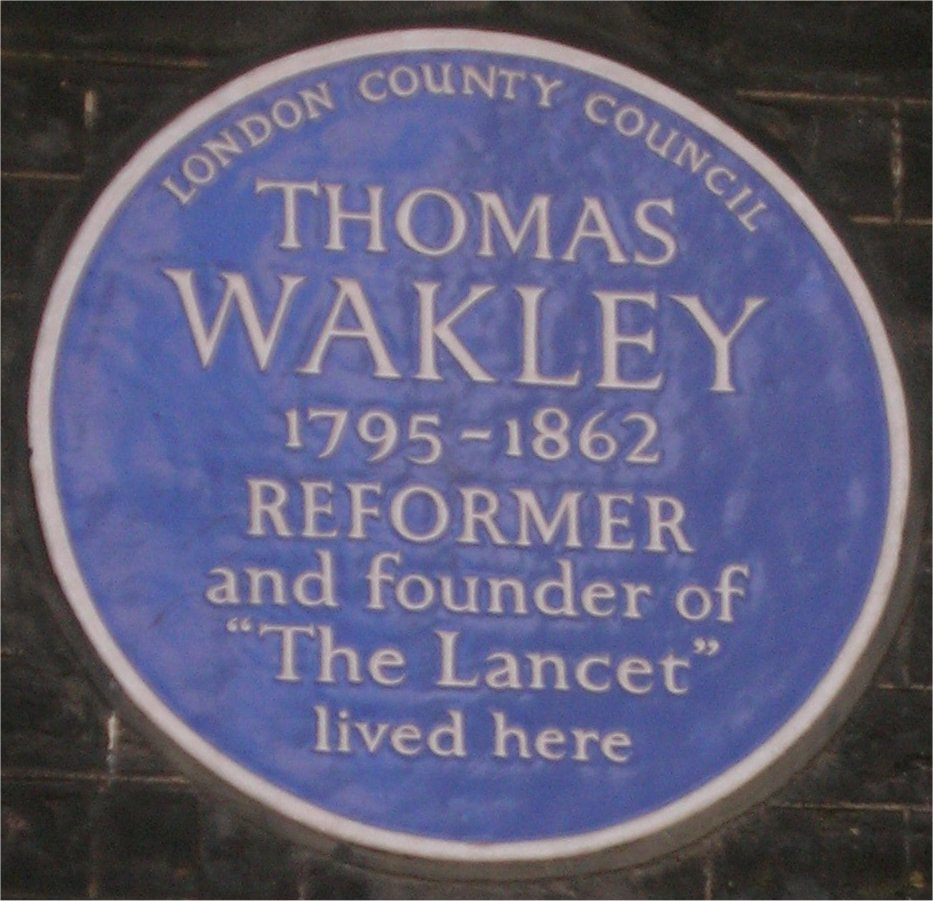
Commemorative plaque outside Wakley's former residence in Bedford Square, London

Wakley's death, on 16 May 1862 in Madeira, was occasioned by pulmonary haemorrhage after a fall from a boat in the harbour. He had been in declining health for about ten years, the symptoms being entirely consistent with tuberculosis. Wakley's three sons survived him, and the Lancet remained in Wakley hands for two more generations. His funeral was a very private affair, attendance restricted to family and close friends; the long-term consequences of his radicalism were eventually appreciated, at least to some extent. Wakley is interred in the catacombs of Kensal Green Cemetery (alcove 59, compartment 13) alongside his wife Elizabeth (alcove 59, compartment 16), who had died three years earlier. There is a blue plaque on his house in Bedford Square, London, and further plaques in the grounds of the Harefield Hospital in Uxbridge, Land Farm in Membury, and Membury parish church .

Parliament of the United Kingdom
Preceded by Robert Spankie; Thomas Slingsby Duncombe	Member of Parliament for Finsbury; 1835–1852; With: Thomas Slingsby Duncombe	Succeeded by Thomas Challis; Thomas Slingsby Duncombe
