= Finsbury (UK Parliament constituency) =

Parliamentary constituency in the United Kingdom, 1918–1950

- Former borough constituency for the House of Commons

1832–1885
- Seats: two
- Created from: Middlesex
- Replaced by: Finsbury Central, Finsbury East, Holborn, Islington East, Islington North , Islington South and Islington West

1918–1950
- Seats: one
- Created from: Finsbury Central and Finsbury East
- Replaced by: Shoreditch and Finsbury

The parliamentary borough of Finsbury was a constituency of the House of Commons of the UK Parliament from 1832 to 1885, and from 1918 to 1950. The constituency was first created in 1832 as one of seven two-seat "metropolis" parliamentary boroughs (five in southeast Middlesex and two in northeast Surrey) other than the two which already existed: Westminster and the City of London; the latter until 1885 retained an exceptional four seats. Finsbury was directly north of the City of London and was smaller than the Finsbury division of the Ossulstone hundred but took in land of Holborn division (hundred division) to its southwest in pre-introduction changes by Boundary Commissioners. It included Finsbury, Holborn, Moorfields, Clerkenwell, Islington, Stoke Newington and historic St Pancras (later mainly known as Camden Town). The 1918 constituency corresponded to the smaller Metropolitan Borough of Finsbury (Finsbury, Moorfields, Clerkenwell, and St Luke's, Islington); it was a seat, thus electing a single member, fulfilling a longstanding aim of Chartism which underscored the 1832 reforms.

== History ==
=== 1832–1885 two-member constituency / parliamentary borough ===
The original constituency was created by the Parliamentary Boundaries Act 1832, which carried into effect the redistribution of parliamentary seats under the Reform Act 1832.

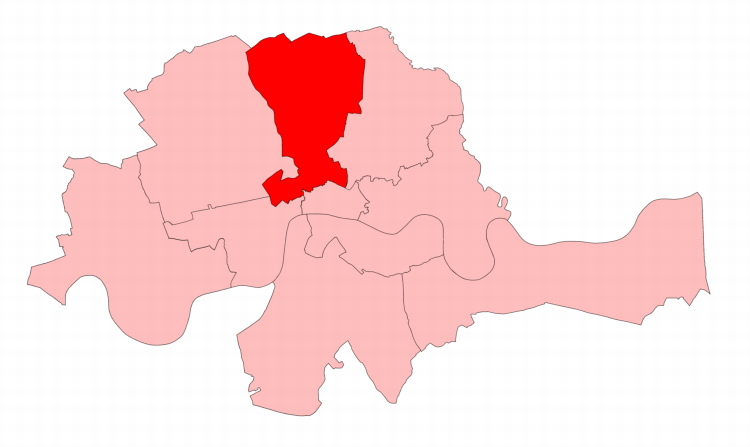
Finsbury in the Metropolitan area, 1868–1885

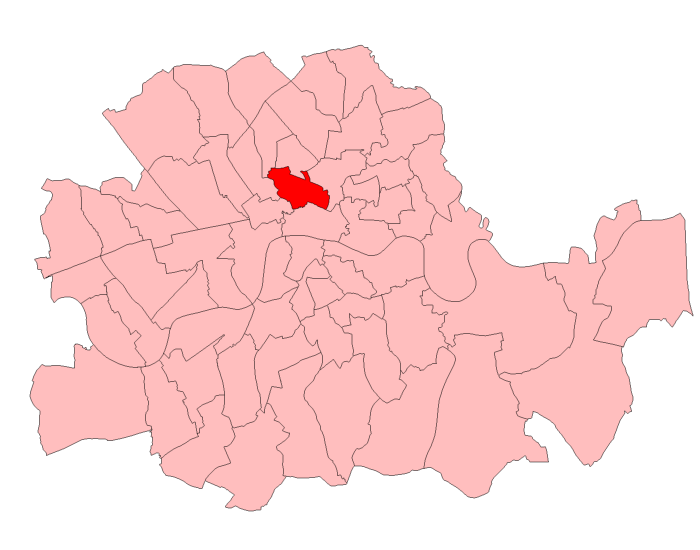
Finsbury in the Parliamentary County of London, 1918–1950

It was originally proposed that the constituency would comprise the entire Finsbury Division and a number of adjoining parishes in the Holborn Division of Ossulstone, one of the hundreds of Middlesex. The commissioners appointed under the Boundaries Act decided to exclude the northern part of the Finsbury Division, which extended as far as Friern Barnet, some nine miles from London and a largely rural area. They could find no natural boundary to separate "the Rural from the Town District" and suggested that the dividing line should run through the northern section of Islington, following limits of relatively recently founded Church of England parishes. The seat as eventually created included the whole of Islington, however.

The parliamentary borough was defined in Schedule O of the Boundaries Act as:

The several Parishes of Saint Luke, Saint George the Martyr, St Giles in the Fields, Saint George Bloomsbury, Saint Mary Stoke Newington, and St. Mary, Islington; the several Liberties or Places of Saffron Hill, Hatton Garden, Ely Rents, Ely Place, the Rolls, Glass House Yard, and the Charterhouse; Lincoln's Inn and Gray's Inn; the Parish of St. James and St. John Clerkenwell, except that Part thereof which is situate to the North of the Parish of Islington; those Parts of the respective Parishes of Saint Sepulchre and Saint Andrew Holborn and of Furnivals Inn and Staple Inn respectively, which are situated without the Liberty of the City of London.

The Redistribution of Seats Act 1885 divided the constituency, by then highly populated, into seven new single member constituencies. Four were divisions of a new Parliamentary Borough of Islington; while the Finsbury Parliamentary Borough was divided into three, named Central Division, East Division and Holborn Division.

=== 1918–1950 seat ===
The Representation of the People Act 1918 created a new single-member Finsbury Parliamentary borough in the County of London, identical to the Metropolitan Borough of Finsbury. In 1950, it was merged with the neighbouring borough of Shoreditch to become Shoreditch and Finsbury.

== Members of Parliament ==
=== MPs 1832–1885 ===
The parliamentary borough returned two members of parliament

Election	First member	First party	Second member	Second party
1832	Robert Grant	Whig	Robert Spankie	Whig
1834 by-election	Thomas Slingsby Duncombe	Radical	Robert Spankie	Whig
1835	Thomas Slingsby Duncombe	Radical	Thomas Wakley	Radical
1852	Thomas Slingsby Duncombe	Radical	Thomas Challis	Radical
1857	Thomas Slingsby Duncombe	Radical	William Cox	Whig
1859	Thomas Slingsby Duncombe	Liberal	Morton Peto	Liberal
1861 by-election	William Cox	Liberal	Morton Peto	Liberal
1865	William McCullagh Torrens	Liberal	Sir Andrew Lusk	Liberal
1885	constituency abolished: see Finsbury Central, Finsbury East and Holborn			

=== MPs 1918–1950 ===
The borough was a single-member constituency.

Election	Member	Party
1918	Martin Archer-Shee	Unionist
1923	George Gillett	Labour
1931	George Gillett	National Labour
1935	George Woods	Labour
1945	John Platts-Mills	Labour
1948	John Platts-Mills	Labour Independent Group
1950	constituency abolished	

== Elections ==
=== Elections in the 1910s ===
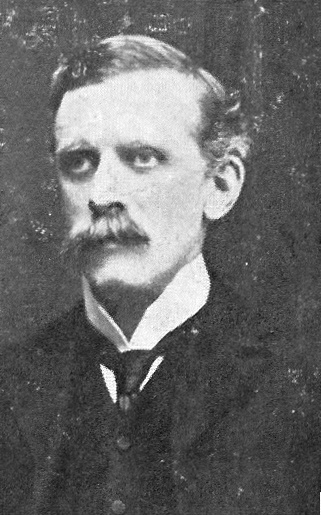
H. E. A. Cotton

General election 1918: Finsbury
Party		Candidate	Votes	%	±%
C	Unionist	Martin Archer-Shee	8,782	63.8	
	Liberal	Evan Cotton	4,981	36.2	
Majority			3,801	27.6	
Turnout			13,763	39.5	
	Unionist win (new seat)				
C indicates candidate endorsed by the coalition government.

=== Elections in the 1920s ===
General election 1922: Finsbury
Party	Candidate	Votes	%	±%
Unionist	Martin Archer-Shee	9,382	44.6	−19.2
Liberal	Harry Gilpin	6,384	30.4	−5.8
Labour	George Gillett	4,903	23.3	New
Independent Labour	Christopher Roland Morden	349	1.7	New
Majority		2,998	14.2	−13.4
Turnout		21,018	54.3	+14.8
Unionist hold		Swing	-6.7	

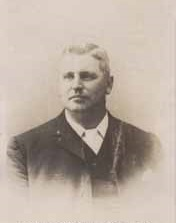
A.H. Scott

General election 1923: Finsbury
Party	Candidate	Votes	%	±%
Labour	George Gillett	8,907	42.4	+19.1
Unionist	Martin Archer-Shee	7,063	33.6	−11.0
Liberal	Alfred Scott	5,054	24.0	−6.4
Majority		1,844	8.8	N/A
Turnout		21,024	53.8	−0.5
Labour gain from Unionist		Swing	+15.0	

General election 1924: Finsbury
Party	Candidate	Votes	%	±%
Labour	George Gillett	12,363	47.0	+4.6
Unionist	Ernest Taylor	11,643	44.2	+10.6
Liberal	Robert Shaw	2,324	8.8	−15.2
Majority		720	2.8	−6.0
Turnout		26,330	66.3	+12.5
Labour hold		Swing	-3.0	

General election 1929: Finsbury
Party	Candidate	Votes	%	±%
Labour	George Gillett	17,970	56.5	+9.5
Unionist	William Ray	9,026	28.3	−15.9
Liberal	William John Pinard	4,855	15.2	+6.4
Majority		8,944	28.2	+25.4
Turnout		31,851	66.0	−0.3
Labour hold		Swing	+12.7	

=== Elections in the 1930s ===
General election 1931: Finsbury
Party	Candidate	Votes	%	±%
National Labour	George Gillett	17,292	63.1	+6.6
Labour Co-op	Thomas Williams	10,133	36.9	−19.6
Majority		7,159	26.2	N/A
Turnout		27,425	58.1	−7.9
National Labour gain from Labour		Swing		

General election 1935: Finsbury
Party	Candidate	Votes	%	±%
Labour Co-op	George Woods	13,408	55.8	+18.9
National Labour	George Gillett	10,600	44.2	−18.9
Majority		2,808	11.6	N/A
Turnout		24,008	56.2	−1.9
Labour Co-op gain from National Labour		Swing	+18.9	

General Election 1939–40

Another general election was required to take place before the end of 1940. The political parties had been making preparations for an election to take place and by the Autumn of 1939, the following candidates had been selected;

- Labour: George Woods
- National Labour: Frederick Burden

=== Elections in the 1940s ===
General election 1945: Finsbury
Party	Candidate	Votes	%	±%
Labour	John Platts-Mills	9,786	70.8	+15.0
Conservative	Frederick Burden	4,029	29.2	New
Majority		5,757	41.6	+30.0
Turnout		13,815	63.9	+7.7
Labour hold		Swing		

=== Elections in the 1880s ===
General election 1880: Finsbury (2 seats)
Party	Candidate	Votes	%	±%
Liberal	Andrew Lusk	16,128	36.5	+4.9
Liberal	William McCullagh Torrens	15,247	34.5	+1.7
Conservative	Francis Duncan	12,800	29.0	+3.8
Majority		2,447	5.5	−0.9
Turnout		28,928 (est)	64.3 (est)	+13.0
Registered electors		44,955		
Liberal hold		Swing	+1.5	
Liberal hold		Swing	−0.1	

=== Elections in the 1870s ===
General election 1874: Finsbury (2 seats)
Party	Candidate	Votes	%	±%
Liberal	William McCullagh Torrens	10,099	32.8	−7.0
Liberal	Andrew Lusk	9,713	31.6	−6.2
Conservative	Charles Wilson Randolph	7,737	25.2	+6.6
Lib-Lab	Benjamin Lucraft	3,205	10.4	New
Majority		1,976	6.4	−12.8
Turnout		18,880 (est)	51.3 (est)	−7.0
Registered electors		36,804		
Liberal hold		Swing	−5.2	
Liberal hold		Swing	−4.8	

=== Elections in the 1860s ===
General election 1868: Finsbury (2 seats)
Party	Candidate	Votes	%	±%
Liberal	William McCullagh Torrens	13,159	39.8	+2.5
Liberal	Andrew Lusk	12,503	37.8	+2.8
Conservative	Peter Frederick O'Malley	6,137	18.6	+14.8
Liberal	William Cox	1,238	3.7	−18.7
Majority		6,366	19.2	+6.6
Turnout		19,587 (est)	58.3 (est)	+12.0
Registered electors		33,601		
Liberal hold		Swing	−6.2	
Liberal hold		Swing	+10.8	

General election 1865: Finsbury (2 seats)
Party	Candidate	Votes	%	±%
Liberal	William McCullagh Torrens	8,480	37.3	N/A
Liberal	Andrew Lusk	7,959	35.0	N/A
Liberal	William Cox	5,100	22.4	+1.0
Conservative	William Phillips	866	3.8	New
Independent Liberal	Philip William Perfitt	316	1.4	New
Majority		2,859	12.6	−4.4
Turnout		11,794 (est)	46.3 (est)	−2.1
Registered electors		25,461		
Liberal hold		Swing	N/A	
Liberal hold		Swing	N/A	

By-election, 17 December 1861: Finsbury (1 seat)
Party	Candidate	Votes	%	±%
Liberal	William Cox	4,884	50.2	+28.8
Liberal	John Remington Mills	4,848	49.8	N/A
Majority		36	0.4	−16.6
Turnout		9,732	43.1	−5.3
Registered electors		22,556		
Liberal hold		Swing	N/A	

- Caused by Duncombe's death.

=== Elections in the 1850s ===
General election 1859: Finsbury (2 seats)
Party	Candidate	Votes	%	±%
Liberal	Thomas Slingsby Duncombe	8,538	40.1	+0.2
Liberal	Morton Peto	8,174	38.4	N/A
Liberal	William Cox	4,556	21.4	−2.3
Majority		3,618	17.0	+0.8
Turnout		10,634 (est)	48.4 (est)	+6.3
Registered electors		21,951		
Liberal hold		Swing	N/A	
Liberal hold		Swing	N/A	

General election 1857: Finsbury (2 seats)
Party	Candidate	Votes	%	±%
Radical	Thomas Slingsby Duncombe	6,922	39.9	−1.3
Whig	William Cox	4,110	23.7	New
Radical	John Humffreys Parry	3,954	22.8	N/A
Whig	Joseph Haythorne Reed	2,378	13.7	New
Turnout		8,682 (est)	42.1 (est)	+1.7
Registered electors		20,626		
Majority		2,812	16.2	−12.6
Radical hold		Swing	N/A	
Majority		156	0.9	N/A
Whig gain from Radical		Swing	N/A	

General election 1852: Finsbury (2 seats)
Party	Candidate	Votes	%	±%
Radical	Thomas Challis	7,504	46.3	N/A
Radical	Thomas Slingsby Duncombe	6,678	41.2	N/A
Radical	James Wyld	2,010	12.4	N/A
Majority		4,668	28.8	N/A
Turnout		8,096 (est)	40.4 (est)	N/A
Registered electors		20,025		
Radical hold		Swing	N/A	
Radical hold		Swing	N/A	

=== Elections in the 1840s ===
General election 1847: Finsbury (2 seats)
Party	Candidate	Votes	%	±%
Radical	Thomas Wakley	Unopposed		
Radical	Thomas Slingsby Duncombe	Unopposed		
Registered electors		15,921		
Radical hold				
Radical hold				

General election 1841: Finsbury (2 seats)
Party	Candidate	Votes	%	±%
Radical	Thomas Wakley	Unopposed		
Radical	Thomas Slingsby Duncombe	Unopposed		
Registered electors		12,974		
Radical hold				
Radical hold				

=== Elections in the 1830s ===
General election 1837: Finsbury (2 seats)
Party	Candidate	Votes	%	±%
Radical	Thomas Wakley	4,957	40.2	+12.2
Radical	Thomas Slingsby Duncombe	4,895	39.7	+2.2
Conservative	Dudley Montague Perceval	2,470	20.0	+0.6
Majority		2,425	19.7	+11.1
Turnout		7,489	61.1	+2.8
Registered electors		12,264		
Radical hold		Swing	+6.0	
Radical hold		Swing	+1.0	

General election 1835: Finsbury (2 seats)
Party	Candidate	Votes	%	±%
Radical	Thomas Slingsby Duncombe	4,497	37.5	N/A
Radical	Thomas Wakley	3,359	28.0	+10.6
Conservative	Robert Spankie	2,332	19.4	N/A
Whig	Henry William Hobhouse	1,817	15.1	N/A
Majority		1,027	8.6	N/A
Turnout		6,003 (est)	58.3 (est)	−12.9
Registered electors		10,299		
Radical gain from Whig		Swing		
Radical gain from Whig		Swing		

By-election, 2 July 1834: Finsbury (1 seat)
Party	Candidate	Votes	%	±%
Radical	Thomas Slingsby Duncombe	2,514	45.7	N/A
Tory	Henry Pownall	1,915	34.8	New
Radical	Thomas Wakley	695	12.6	−4.8
Whig	Charles Babbage	379	6.9	−11.8
Majority		599	10.9	N/A
Turnout		5,503	59.2	−12.0
Registered electors		9,294		
Radical gain from Whig		Swing		

- Caused by Grant's appointment as Governor of Bombay

General election 1832: Finsbury (2 seats)
Party	Candidate	Votes	%	±%
Whig	Robert Grant	4,278	34.6	
Whig	Robert Spankie	2,842	23.0	
Whig	Charles Babbage	2,311	18.7	
Radical	Thomas Wakley	2,151	17.4	
Radical	Christopher Temple	787	6.4	
Majority		531	4.3	
Turnout		7,344	71.2	
Registered electors		10,309		
Whig win (new seat)				
Whig win (new seat)				
