= Cooper v Wakley =

English tort law case

- Court: Westminster Assizes
- Citations: (1828) 172 ER 507, (1828) 3 Carrington and Payne 474

Court membership
- Judge sitting: Lord Tentenden CJ

Keywords
- Libel, medical negligence

Cooper v Wakley (1828) 172 ER 507 is an English tort law case, concerning the libel by the editor of The Lancet.

== Facts ==
Dr.Thomas Wakley alleged in The Lancet that Dr. Bransby Cooper had negligently performed an operation on a patient. He alleged Dr. Cooper caused a patient incredible suffering as he attempted to extract a bladder stone through a cut beneath the scrotum. The patient subsequently died. Dr. Cooper sued Dr. Wakley for defaming him and asked for 2000 pounds to be paid in damages. The Court ruled in favor of Dr Cooper and awarded him 100 pounds as damages.

== Judgment ==
R. Scarlett, for the plaintiff (Dr Cooper), having opened the pleadings—

Sir J. Scarlett, as the plaintiff's leading counsel, contended, that the plaintiff had the right to begin, the affirmative of the issue being upon his client; and he argued, that, as the issue was, whether the plaintiff had performed an operation in an unskilful and unsurgeonlike manner, and had occupied too much time, it was incumbent upon the plaintiff to give evidence of his skill.

Lord Tenterden, C. J.—That he occupied too long a time is an affirmative.

Sir J. Scarlett.—Besides this, I submit, that, as the damages are unliquidated, that gives the plaintiff a right to begin, to shew the extent of the injury he has received.

Lord Tenterden, C. J.—Till the issue is tried that question does not arise. The defendant, in person, relied on the cases of Hodges v. Holder, Jackson v. Hesketh, and Bedell v. Russell.

Sir J. Scarlett.—On the question of skill or no skill, the proof of the affirmative is proof of the skill. The plaintiff here complains of the defendant's charging him with want of skill; and the defendant, by his pleas, has put the plaintiff's skill in issue. Now, as the defendant has denied the skill of the plaintiff, it lies upon the plaintiff to prove it; and the last case cited shews that Lord Chief Justice Best thought that the plaintiff should have begun, and would have so held, except that he felt himself bound by the previous authorities.

Lord Tenterden, C. J. (addressing the defendant).—You see that Sir James Scarlett contends, that certain parts of your pleas call upon him to prove an affirmative. It therefore becomes material to consider what these several pleas are. In the second plea, you allege that the operation was performed by the plaintiff without proper and sufficient skill, and that the operation did not present such difficulties as no degree of skill could have surmounted; but because the operation was performed as aforesaid, you justify the publication. The third plea is, that the plaintiff, in performing the operation, occupied a longer time than was necessary, and performed it in an unsurgeonlike manner, causing greater pain to the patient than was necessary; and the fourth plea is, that the operation occupied a longer time than was necessary, and was performed in an unskilful manner. These being the allegations of the pleas, Sir James Scarlett contends, that he should begin by proving the plaintiff's skill. Now, upon that, do you wish to make any further observation?

The defendant.—I charge the plaintiff with unskilfulness, and come here prepared to prove it.

Lord Tenterden, C. J.—As the decision in this case will probably be quoted as a precedent, I shall avail myself of the assistance of the other learned Judges.

His Lordship then went out of Court to confer with Bayley, Littledale, and J. Parke, Js., and on his return said: “I am of opinion that the defendant has a right to begin. The general rule is, that that party on whom the affirmative lies has to begin; and in one, at least, of the cases cited, the plaintiff was seeking to recover unliquidated damages. I mean the case of Bedell v. Russell. It has been said, that here the affirmative is upon the plaintiff:—however, upon reading these pleas, I find nothing of that kind. The plaintiff must, in the first instance, be taken to exercise his profession with skill, as no one is presumed to have misconducted himself; and, if the defendant asserts that the plaintiff wanted skill, and occupied unnecessary time in the performance of an operation, it lies upon him to prove it; and so, if the defendant says, that an operation was unskilfully performed, and caused more pain than was necessary, it lies upon him to prove that also. It is incumbent upon the defendant to make out the truth of all these assertions; and till that is done, the plaintiff is not called upon to go into any evidence. I ought also to add, that my learned Brothers concur with me in this opinion.”

The defendant then stated his case to the Jury, and called his witnesses. After that the plaintiff's counsel addressed the Jury, and called witnesses; and the defendant replied.

Lord Tenterden, C. J., left it to the Jury to say, whether the allegations of the pleas had been made out to their satisfaction. Verdict for the plaintiff.—Damages £100.

Sir J. Scarlett, F. Pollock, and R. Scarlett, for the plaintiff.

The defendant (Dr Wakley), in person.

== See also ==
- English tort law
