= Thomas Slingsby Duncombe =

British politician (1796–1861)

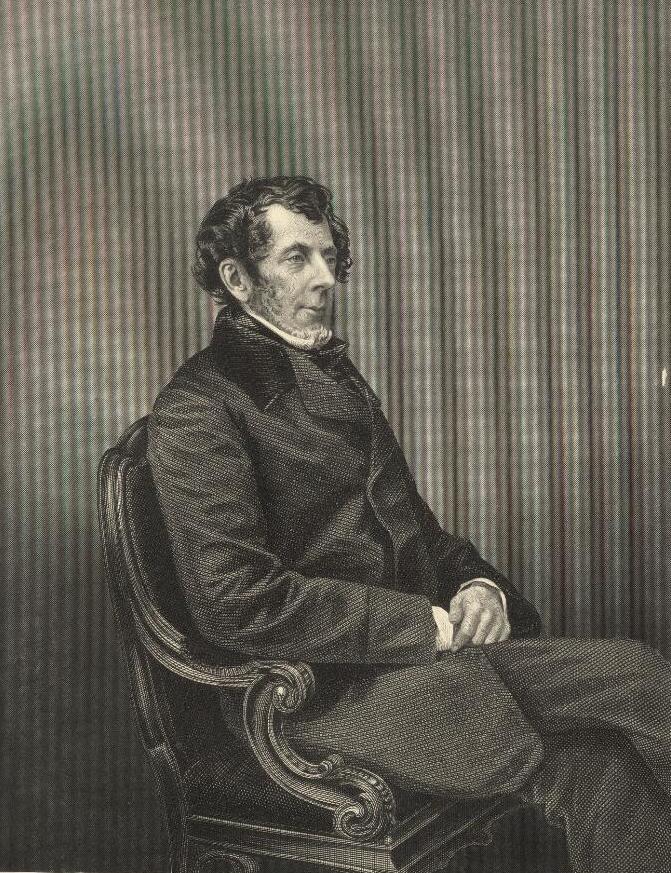
Engraving of Duncombe, c. 1858

Thomas Slingsby Duncombe (13 January 1796 – 13 November 1861) was a British radical politician, who was a member of the Parliament of the United Kingdom for Hertford from 1826 to 1832 and for Finsbury from 1834 until his death.

Duncombe was a tireless champion of radical causes in the 27 years he served the North East London borough of Finsbury. But he was equally well known for his style; he was, it was often said, "the handsomest and best-dressed man in the house," and his love for theatre, gaming and women were well publicized. Duncombe was elected and then returned to his seat seven times by the shopkeepers, artisans and laborers, the Nonconformists, Catholics, and Jews of Finsbury, making him the longest-sitting representative of a metropolitan borough in his day. His constituents called him "Honest Tom Duncombe" with great affection; to his detractors he was known as the "Dandy Demagogue" or the "Radical Dandy". His name was celebrated in working men's newspapers and frequently mentioned in the gossip sheets of high society. Duncombe was, as The Times put it delicately upon his death, a "character".

== Life and career ==
Duncombe was born wealthy and well-connected in 1796 in Middlesex. His parents, Thomas and Emma Duncombe, had an estate in the West Riding of Yorkshire. He was the grandson (on his mother's side) to the Bishop of Peterborough, and nephew to the first Baron Feversham. He attended Harrow school from 1808 to 1811, leaving to take up a commission in the elite regiment of the Coldstream Guards. While in the Guards, Duncombe served as aide-de-camp to General Sir Ronald Ferguson. As Ferguson was well known for supporting the ballot and other political reforms during his time in Parliament, it is likely that it was here that Duncombe had his first political awakening as a radical. After being raised to the rank of Lieutenant, Duncombe resigned from the army in 1819.

=== Early service in Parliament ===
In 1820, Duncombe ran for Parliament for Pontefract as a Whig candidate. He lost. In 1823, he ran again as a Whig for Hertford and was again unsuccessful. In June 1826, Duncombe finally won a seat in Parliament for Hertford. He enjoyed a great success in the Commons with two early speeches in which he vigorously attacked the Government. According to Greville, however, he had merely committed to heart and rehearsed speeches which had been prepared for him by Henry de Ros. Greville noted caustically in his diary for 25 February 1828:

"And what are the agents who have produced such an effect? A man of ruined fortune and doubtful character, whose life has been spent on the race-course, at the gaming-table, and in the green-room, of limited capacity, exceedingly ignorant, and without any stock but his impudence to trade on, only speaking to serve an electioneering purpose, and crammed by another with every thought and every word that he uttered."

Duncombe was returned in 1830 and again in 1831. Over the course of these contests he spent an estimated £40,000; a fact he later frankly admitted in pressing the case for political reforms. Outspent by his rival, the Tory Marquis of Salisbury, Duncombe lost his seat in 1832. Outmanoeuvring Salisbury, Duncombe challenged the election on grounds of bribery and had it declared void.

As a representative for Hertford he was an early supporter of political reform, though made little lasting impression in Parliament. He made more of an impression in society where he built a reputation as a dandy, a rake, a theatre supporter, and one of the best gentleman horseriders in England. He was close friends with Count D'Orsay, who sketched a portrait of his "cher Tomie" that still resides in the collection of the National Portrait Gallery. For a time "Tommy" was attached to Madame Vestris, the famed actress and later lessee of the Olympic Theatre. Lady Blessington used him as a model for the hero of one of her novels and the novelist-cum-Prime Minister, Benjamin Disraeli, recalled that his friend Duncombe was later to be his resource on Chartism for Sybil: or The Two Nations.

=== Radical for Finsbury ===
The Reform Act 1832 created new metropolitan boroughs that needed representation. In 1834, Duncombe won a seat representing the new North East London borough of Finsbury, spending less than £16 to do so. In his acceptance speech he laid out his increasingly independent and Radical politics: promising to fight for religious liberty and an end to church rates and sinecures, reform of taxation and modernizing the economy, and the ballot, the franchise and triennial parliamentary terms; the core principles of what would become the People's Charter of Chartism four years later. Indeed, Duncombe was to introduce the second petition for the People's Charter to Parliament in 1842. Signed by more than 3.3 million people, the petition had to be unrolled to fit through the doors of the House of Commons.

As Radical MP for Finsbury, Duncombe became increasingly outspoken. He sought to obtain the release of John Frost and other Chartists. He campaigned against the new Poor Law and other "reforms" of Edwin Chadwick. He exposed conditions in prison hulks and the treatment of the insane. He exposed the practice of the Home Office opening the mail of political dissidents such as the Italian Mazzini and, as it was later revealed, himself. And, taking on an issue particularly dear, he chaired a committee that examined—and ridiculed—the power of the Lord Chamberlain's office to censor and restrict the theatre. He also took up the cause of religious Dissenters, Catholics and Jews, including the claim of Baron Rothschild to take his seat in Parliament, and was a particular advocate of Jewish emancipation, spending the last years of his life helping edit a book on The Jews of England: Their History and Wrongs.

=== Radical at large ===
Outside Parliament Duncombe worked to support working men and women. He chaired the national conference of trades in 1845 and helped organize the National Association of United Trades for the Protection of Labour (NAUT), serving as the body's president for seven years. Duncombe was a frequent speaker at trade union functions, and came out in public support of a number of strikes. The enigmatic radical was also equally at home in the green rooms of theatres and the gambling halls of exclusive clubs like Crockford's and Almack's where he ran up debts to the astounding amount of £120,000 – £140,000 (in excess of £8 million in 2006 pounds) . His creditors had him arrested in 1847 and he was heavily criticized for using parliamentary privilege to escape punishment. Indeed, his critics accused Duncombe of using an earlier trip to Canada to support his friend and political patron Lord Durham as a ruse to escape his debts.

=== Performative politics ===
Even his critics, of which he had many, had to admit that as a debater Duncombe was one of the best in the House of Commons. His jocular manner disarmed his opponents and charmed his supporters. His polemical speaking style, and sartorial dressing style, was even parodied by Charles Dickens in a brief sketch in Nicholas Nickleby. Exhibiting a new style of politics, Duncombe performed not only for the politicians assembled in the House but for "the people out of doors," as the public were then called. In spite of his dandified affectations, or perhaps—given the growing popularity of commercial spectacles like the sights of the Vauxhall and Cremorne pleasure gardens and the Crystal Palace—partly because of his colorful performance, he was immensely popular with the public. His open embrace of pleasure, his sartorial style and the perceived and real excesses of his personal life, far from being the distraction from politics as his critics frequently commented, may actually have been an integral asset to his popularity.

=== Sickness and death ===
Duncombe was plagued by a bronchial condition that would eventually kill him. Between 1847 and 1850 he was often too sick to attend Parliament regularly. But when he could he did, and gaunt and emaciated, this dandified child of privilege continued to stand up in the House for the rights of the less visible and less fortunate, and chair the long and arduous meetings of trade unionists.

In 1856, already ill, he championed the case of the Hungarian revolutionary exile István Türr, arrested by the Austrian authorities and in concrete danger of being executed, and helped push the British government to intervene and get him freed.

Duncombe died at the age of 65 in Sussex, and a week later he was buried at Kensal Green Cemetery in London.

== Books by Duncombe ==
- Duncombe, Thomas Slingsby and James Acland, The Jews of England: Their History and Wrongs (London: J. Wade, 1866)

Parliament of the United Kingdom
Preceded by Nicolson Calvert; Thomas Byron	Member of Parliament for Hertford; 1826–1832; With: Thomas Byron to 1830; Viscount Ingestrie 1830–1831; John Currie 1831–1832	Succeeded by Viscount Mahon; Viscount Ingestrie
Preceded by Robert Grant; Robert Spankie	Member of Parliament for Finsbury; 1834–1861; With: Robert Spankie to 1835; Thomas Wakley 1835–1852; Thomas Challis 1852–1859; William Cox 1859; Samuel Morton Peto from 1859	Succeeded by William Cox; Samuel Morton Peto
