= James G. Wakley =

English doctor and editor of the Lancet

James G. Wakley

James Goodchild Wakley (December 1825 in Brompton – 30 August 1886 in Longcross) was a physician and later co-joint editor along with his older brother of the general medical journal The Lancet, from 1862 when his father died, to his death in 1886. Wakley was principally known as one of the most vociferous and public critics of Joseph Lister's antiseptic technique, indeed becoming his nemesis.

== Life ==
Wakley was the youngest son of the English surgeon and politician Thomas Wakley and Elizabeth Goodchild, whose father was a merchant and a governor of St Thomas' Hospital. Wakley had three siblings, but his sister had died young. He had two brothers, His eldest brother was Henry Membury Wakley (1824–1903) who became a barrister and sat as deputy coroner under his father. His other older brother was Thomas Henry Wakley (1821–1907).

== Education ==
His early education was completed at a school in the village of Hanwell, that is now part of the London Borough of Ealing. Wakley then attended University College London where his professional training was completed. In 1849 he became a member of the Royal College of Surgeons of England. In 1852 he was awarded a Doctor of Medicine at King's College, Aberdeen.
