= Lightning Love (band) =

American indie pop band

- Origin: Ypsilanti, Michigan, United States
- Genres: Pop; Indie
- Years active: 2007–present
- Labels: Quite Scientific Records
- Members: Leah Diehl; Aaron Diehl; Ben Collins

Lightning Love is an indie pop band based in Ypsilanti, Michigan, United States. With keyboard and vocals by Leah Diehl, Ben Collins on Guitar, and Aaron Diehl on drums. Their sound is up-beat and minimal, contrasted by lyrics that often express isolation and self-consciousness.

== History ==
Lightning Love is an indie pop trio formed in the fall of 2007. Leah, Aaron and Ben, all former members of the band Minor Planets, formed Lightning Love in the fall of 2007. They released their self-recorded and produced album, November Birthday, in December 2008. The group has been on an unofficial hiatus since February 2013.

Vice.com published an extremely short review of Blonde Album: "I can’t think of what this reminds me of, but whatever it is it makes me want to tap dance on a piano". This album was reissued by Lost in Ohio in 2023.

== Discography ==
- November Birthday LP (2008)
- Girls Who Look Like Me EP (2012)
- Blonde Album LP (2012)

=== Songs in TV and film ===
| Year | Movie | Song | Notes |
|---|---|---|---|
| 2010 | Playing Dead (Miniseries) | "Friends" | Directed by Ted Raimi |
| 2010 | The Virginity Hit | "Everyone I Know" | Produced by Adam McKay and Will Ferrell, directed by Huck Botko and Andrew Gurland. |

== See also ==
- Music of Detroit
