= Whitney Matheson =

American pop culture writer

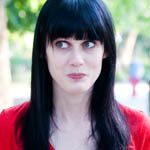
- Matheson in 2016
- Born: April 21, 1977 (age 49); Fredericksburg, Virginia, U.S.
- Education: University of Tennessee
- Occupation: Journalist
- Spouse: Rhyne Piggott
- Children: 1
- Writing career
- Subject: Pop culture
- Notable work: Pop Candy blog
- Notable awards: Best Culture Blog of 2006
- Website: whitneymatheson.com

Whitney Matheson (born April 21, 1977) is a pop culture writer. She was the author of Pop Candy, a popular entertainment blog which was part of USA Today from 1999–2014. She also wrote entertainment and pop culture features for the newspaper.

Matheson has delivered pop-culture commentary on several television networks, including VH1, E!, and G4 TV.

== Career ==
Matheson earned a journalism degree from the University of Tennessee in 1999, and joined USA Today and created Pop Candy that same year. Pop Candy began as a weekly online pop-culture column that covered television, movies, comic books, and music. During this period, Matheson also wrote a daily blog, Hip Clicks. As her web audience grew, Matheson merged Hip Clicks and Pop Candy in 2005 to form the Pop Candy blog. During its tenure, Pop Candy was cited in Wired, Slate, The Rough Guide to Blogging, and on many other entertainment blogs, including Stereogum, Entertainment Weekly's PopWatch, and RollingStone.com.

Editor & Publisher and Mediaweek awarded Pop Candy an EPpy award for the Best Entertainment Blog in 2008. In 2006, the Weblog Awards honored Pop Candy as the Best Culture Blog.

On September 3, 2014, Matheson confirmed that she had been laid off as part of a USA Today drawdown. Soon afterwards she was invited by former USA Today editor-in-chief Ken Paulson to serve as Journalist in Residence at Middle Tennessee State University in Murfreesboro, Tennessee.

On May 13, 2019, Matheson unveiled her digital children's book We Make Comics, illustrated by Genevieve Kote.

== Personal life ==
Matheson lives in Brooklyn, New York with her husband, Rhyne Piggott. They have one daughter.
