= Finsbury East (London County Council constituency) =

London County Council constituency

- Former constituency for the London County Council

Former constituency
- Created: 1889
- Abolished: 1919
- Member(s): 2
- Replaced by: Finsbury

Finsbury East was a constituency used for elections to the London County Council between 1889 and 1919. The seat shared boundaries with the UK Parliament constituency of the same name.

== Councillors ==
Year	Name	Party	Name	Party
1889	John Benn	Progressive	John Sinclair	Progressive
1892	John Benn	Progressive	Archibald Primrose	Progressive
1895	John Benn	Progressive	Joseph Allen Baker	Progressive
1898	Joseph Benson	Progressive	Joseph Allen Baker	Progressive
1904	Thomas Edmund Harvey	Progressive	Joseph Allen Baker	Progressive
1907	Enos Howes	Municipal Reform	Alfred Welby	Municipal Reform
1910	H. E. A. Cotton	Progressive	George Gillett	Progressive

== Election results ==
1889 London County Council election: Finsbury East
Party	Candidate	Votes	%	±%
Progressive	Sir John Benn	1,791		
Progressive	John Sinclair	1,655		
Moderate	John Brogden Moreland	1,098		
Moderate	George Berry	1,071		
Moderate	Robert Josiah Hall	66		
Progressive win (new seat)				
Progressive win (new seat)				

1892 London County Council election: Finsbury East
Party	Candidate	Votes	%	±%
Progressive	Archibald Primrose	2,045		
Progressive	Sir John Benn	2,031		
Moderate	James Tolimann	928		
Moderate	Michael H. Temple	918		
Progressive hold		Swing		
Progressive hold		Swing		

1895 London County Council election: Finsbury East
Party	Candidate	Votes	%	±%
Progressive	Sir John Benn	1,805		
Progressive	Joseph Allen Baker	1,787		
Moderate	S. P. Ridley	1,407		
Moderate	W. H. Devenish	1,404		
Progressive hold		Swing		
Progressive hold		Swing		

1898 London County Council election: Finsbury East
Party	Candidate	Votes	%	±%
Progressive	Joseph Allen Baker	2,114		
Progressive	Joseph Benson	2,038		
Moderate	Walter Smith	1,391		
Moderate	W. W. Grantham	1,338		
Progressive hold		Swing		
Progressive hold		Swing		

1901 London County Council election
Party	Candidate	Votes	%	±%
Progressive	Joseph Allen Baker	2,471	37.3	+6.6
Progressive	Joseph Benson	2,409	36.4	+6.8
Conservative	William Porter	870	13.1	−7.1
Conservative	Herbert John Marcus	870	13.1	−6.3
Progressive hold		Swing	+6.7	
Progressive hold		Swing		

1904 London County Council election: Finsbury East
Party	Candidate	Votes	%	±%
Progressive	Joseph Allen Baker	2,336		
Progressive	Thomas Edmund Harvey	2,190		
Conservative	Enos Howes	1,772		
Conservative	Walter Smith	1,618		
Majority				
Progressive hold		Swing		
Progressive hold		Swing		

1907 London County Council election: Finsbury East
Party	Candidate	Votes	%	±%
Municipal Reform	Alfred Welby	2,024		
Municipal Reform	Enos Howes	2,014		
Progressive	Thomas Edmund Harvey	1,988		
Progressive	F. A. Harrison	1,988		
Majority				
Municipal Reform gain from Progressive		Swing		
Municipal Reform gain from Progressive		Swing		

1910 London County Council election: Finsbury East
Party	Candidate	Votes	%	±%
Progressive	Evan Cotton	2,026	27.9	
Progressive	George Gillett	2,020	27.8	
Municipal Reform	Lord Hardwicke	1,616	22.3	
Municipal Reform	Joseph Lewthwaite	1,592	21.9	
Majority				
Progressive gain from Municipal Reform		Swing		
Progressive gain from Municipal Reform		Swing		

1913 London County Council election: Finsbury East
Party	Candidate	Votes	%	±%
Progressive	George Gillett	2,037	26.2	−1.6
Progressive	H. E. A. Cotton	2,026	26.1	−1.8
Municipal Reform	Eustace Widdrington Morrison-Bell	1,866	24.0	+1.7
Municipal Reform	William Perring	1,837	23.7	+1.8
Majority		160	2.1	−3.4
Progressive hold		Swing	-1.7	
Progressive hold		Swing	-1.8	
