= 1886 Brentford by-election =

UK Parliamentary by-election

The 1886 Brentford by-election was held on 23 December 1886 following the death of the incumbent Conservative MP, Octavius Coope on 27 November 1886.

== Candidates ==
The Conservative Party candidate was James Bigwood who had been MP for Finsbury East from 1885 until being defeated at the 1886 general election. Bigwood was a partner in the firm of Champion & Co., mustard and vinegar manufacturers located in Finsbury.

The Liberal Party candidate was James Haysman. Haysman had contested this constituency at the 1885 and 1886 general elections.

There were six polling stations: Brentford Town Hall, Twickenham Town Hall, Isleworth board school, Norwood Green board school, Hanwell board school, and Hounslow board school.

== Result ==
The Conservative Party held the seat.

1886 Brentford by-election
Party	Candidate	Votes	%	±%
Conservative	James Bigwood	2,572	66.2	−2.2
Liberal	James Haysman	1,316	33.8	+2.2
Majority		1,256	32.4	−4.4
Turnout		3,888	48.8	−7.1
Registered electors		7,971		
Conservative hold		Swing	−2.2	
