= Hansi Neumann flight =

First evacuation of refugee children from Prague in 1939

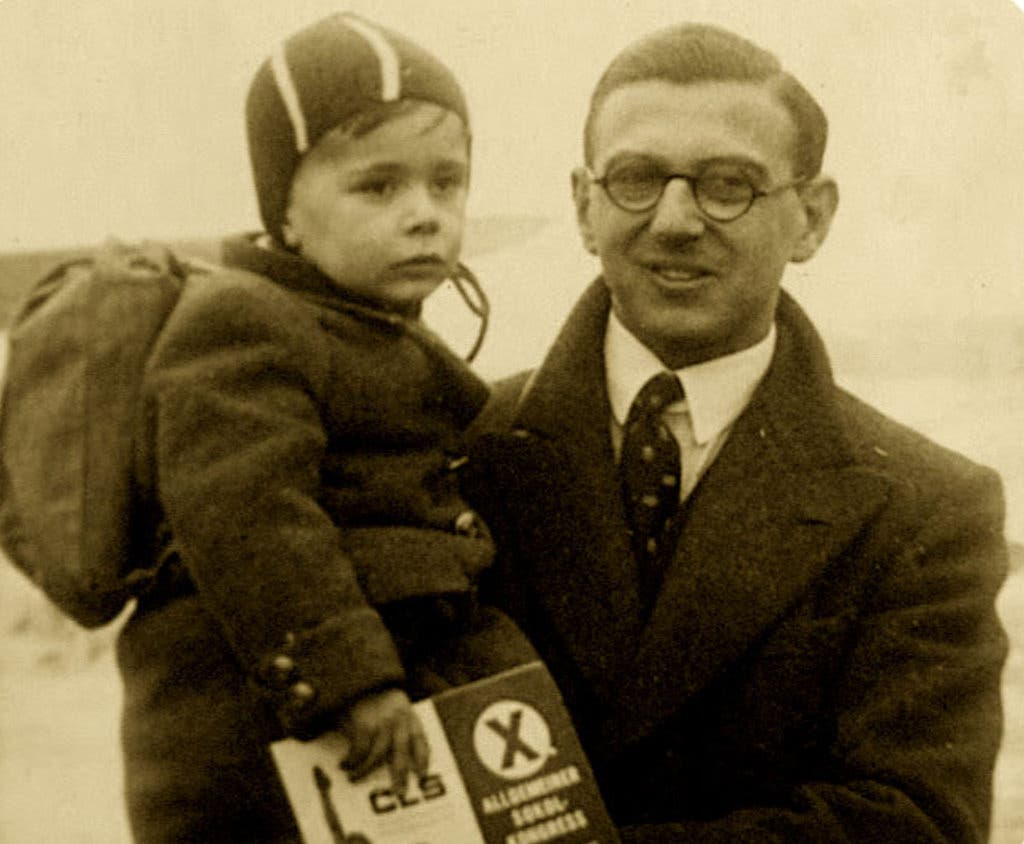
- Nicholas Winton and Hansi on the apron, Václav Havel Airport, Prague (January 1939)
- Date: January 1939
- Venue: Prague–Ruzyně Airport, Prague, Czechoslovakia
- Location: Prague
- Also known as: Czech kindertransport
- Organised by: Barbican Mission to Jewish People; British Committee for Refugees from Czechoslovakia
- Filmed by: Universal News
- Outcome: Landed at Croydon, England (12 January 1939)

The Hansi Neumann flight was the first flight to evacuate refugee children from Prague, Czechoslovakia, to Croydon, England, in January 1939, in the lead-up to the Second World War. Part of the Czech kindertransport, it was completed in a Dutch Douglas aircraft of KLM, and organised by the Barbican Mission to Jewish People and the British Committee for Refugees from Czechoslovakia (BCRC). Around 18 Jewish children were on the flight.

News of the flight was covered by journalists and photographers at the time. A two and a half minute film was taken of the departure by Julius Jonak of Universal News. Images of the BCRC's Nicholas Winton and the child Hansi at the airport, inspired a memorial later placed at the main railway station, Prague.

== Background ==
In the lead up to the Second World War, the Barbican Mission to Jewish People and the British Committee for Refugees from Czechoslovakia (BCRC), organised flights to evacuate mostly Jewish children from Prague to England, part of the Czech kindertransport. The first of these flights was one of two Dutch Douglas aircraft of KLM, made available in January 1939. (Note: Generally, only a very small percentage of the total refugee children in Europe were evacuated by flight. Most went by train and ship.)

The Barbican Mission was an organisation whose intention was to bring Jewish children from Prague to Britain and bring them up as Christians. It declared that its mission was "to proclaim the Gospel of our lord Jesus Christ to the Jews". Key members were Reverends Isaac Emmanuel Davidson, the Barbican Mission's director, his wife Lucy, and William Edward Wallner, the representative in Prague. The BCRC had been established in late October 1938 in response to the increase in requests for refuge abroad. Its purpose was to make arrangements and allocate funds for Czech refugees who may travel to Britain. One of its associates was Nicholas Winton, a 29 year old British stock-broker of German-Jewish origin. In December 1938, Marie Schmolka, Hannah Steiner and Martin Blake, asked him to hold off his skiing holiday in the Alps and visit Prague instead. The message he received began "600 children in Prague and elsewhere in Czechoslovakia urgently require emigration to England." In Prague, he became acquainted with the BCRC's Doreen Warriner and other officers involved in rescuing refugees. Winton remained there for around three weeks, helping with others, to organise the evacuation of mostly Jewish children refugees to England. At the time, KLM had been well established, was popular and successful at Croydon, with Spry Leverton as the KLM's longstanding representative there, and with their main office at The Hague.

== Flight ==
Jewish children leave Prague for Britain by flight (January 1939)

On 9 January 1939, Davidson had given a press release from Hatton House, Lubbock Road, the residence of F. E. Fehr, regarding growing anti-semitism and need to evacuate at risk children in Prague.

=== Departure from Prague ===
One of several flights organised by the Barbican Mission before 15 March 1939, the first flight of all Jewish children left Prague in January 1939. KLM made available two Dutch Douglas aircraft that day. At the scene of departure, were the children, their parents, Winton, photographers and journalists.

Winton's scrapbook, Saving the Children, Czechoslovakia 1939, notes that "the first party of children today left Prague. This was fixed up by the Barbican Mission to the Jews in London and transport was arranged by us. Being the first lot of kids to leave Czechoslovakia it aroused much attention and cinema men and journalists were very much in evidence". The cameraman noted "today on the aerodrome of Ruzyn nearly 30 children of refugees took leave of their parents. Two Dutch Douglas airplanes brought them to Rotterdam and from there to London. This is the charitable work of the Barbican Mission of London, under the direction of Rev. Wallner. He intends to give 60 children altogether a new home in London where they will remain till their 18th year".

=== Arrival at Croydon ===
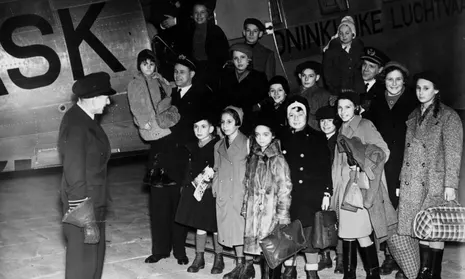
Children from Prague arrive at Croydon, 12 January 1939

The flight landed at Croydon airport, South London, in the afternoon of 12 January 1939. The children received a formal reception upon arrival at the airport. There, they would have been required to complete entry formalities and undergo medical inspections. (Note: Medical inspections would have been by immigration.) They were met by W. A. Leon, of the movement for the care of children from Germany. Also meeting the children were the Davidsons, who took them by bus to Brockley. They were first housed at Christ Church Parish Hall, some later being transferred to Seven Trees, a large house acquired by the Barbican Mission, on Lubbock Road, Chislehurst. Most children were found homes in the Chislehurst area.

== Children ==
The number of children on the flight was reported as 18. Their parents included lawyers, doctors and journalists. Hansi Neumann, also referred to as Hansi Beck, was born on 28 August 1935. He died in April 1940 from complications following an ear infection. An account in the Prism : An Interdisciplinary Journal for Holocaust Educators says that his father found his way to England to look for the boy, while the rest of his family were killed. Other sources say both his parents died later in a concentration camp. Ilse Ryder was 10 years old at the time. Two months later she was reunited with her mother, who arrived on a domestic permit. Other children included Gertie Verging, Eva Somers, Holger Heller, Eva Heller Lewis, Renata Ornea, and Ewald Heller.

Swedish Airlines also contributed to subsequent airlifts. On 8 March 1939, another group of 20 children left Prague by flight, and a further group left on 14 March. By the onset of the war, two houses on Lubbock Road had been acquired, one for 52 boys and the other for 26 girls. No further children were moved.

== Media coverage and legacy ==
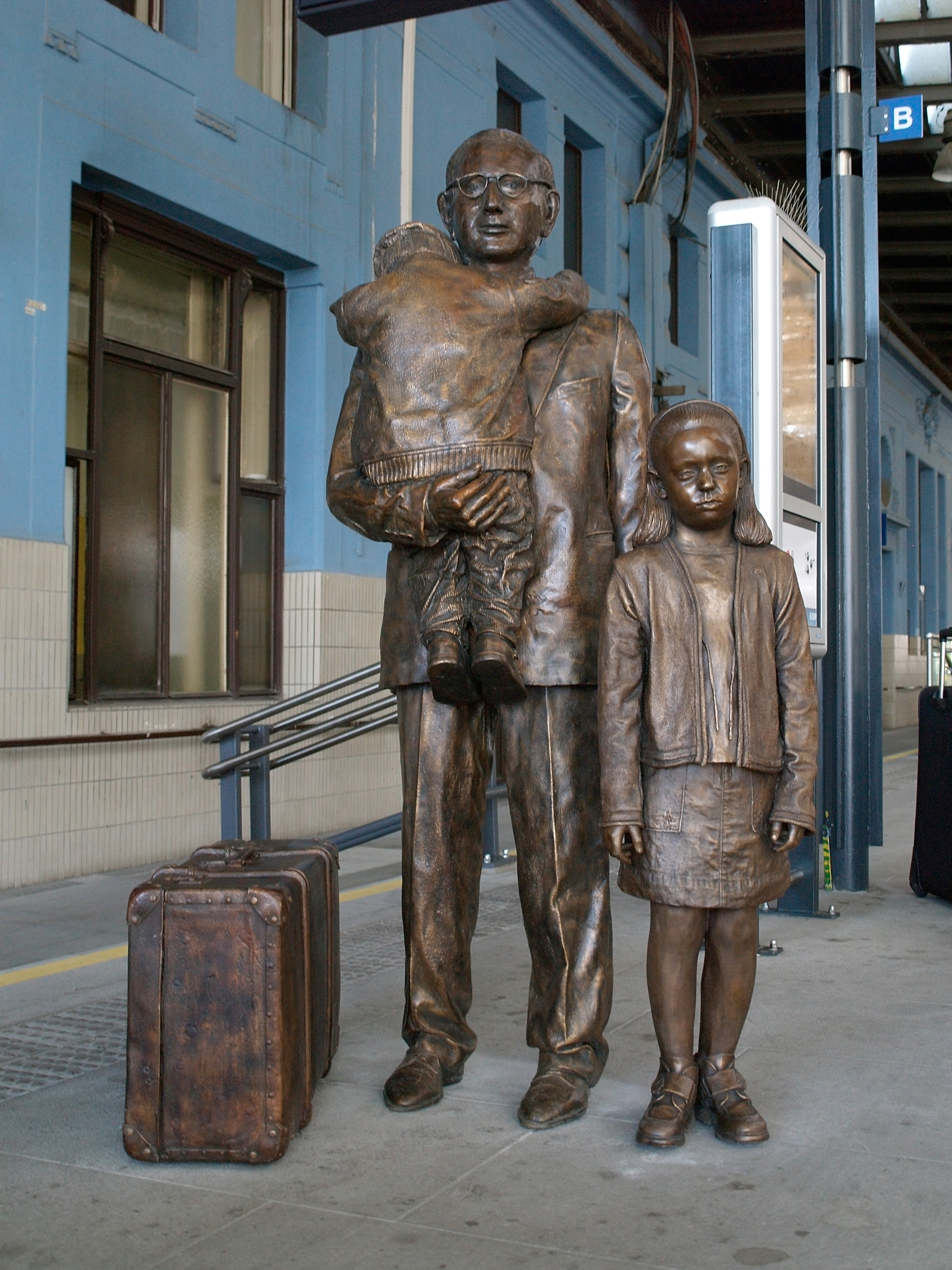
Winton's Prague memorial by Flor Kent, based on 1939 photograph with Hansi, Praha hlavní nádraží, platform 1

A two and a half minute film was made of the departure. The camera was operated by Julius Jonak, and the film was produced by Universal News.

News of the flight was covered by journalists and photographers at the time and has since received widespread media attention, with Winton featured in photographs with Hansi.

The artist Flor Kent, based a memorial at the main railway station, Prague, on an image of Winton and Hansi taken just prior to the departure. A memorial plaque to the Davidsons was erected at Lubbock Road, Chislehurst.
