= Frank Emil Fehr =

British businessman and underwriter (1874-1948)

- Born: 1874
- Died: 1948 (aged 73–74)
- Occupation: Businessman

Frank Emil Fehr CBE (1874–1948), was a British businessman and underwriter.

As president of the London Oil and Tallow Trades Association and Assistant Director of Oil and Oilseeds Supply, Ministry of Food, he was awarded the Commander of the Most Excellent Order of the British Empire (CBE) in 1920. In that year he stood in the Dartford by-election. He was President of the Kent County Football Association between 1920 and 1930 and again between 1944 and 1948.

Between 1937 and 1939 he was chairman of the Baltic Exchange. On 9 January 1939, his home, Hatton House, Lubbock Road, Chislehurst, was used by the Barbican Mission to the Jews to announce the desperation of refugees in Czechoslovakia and the urgency of evacuating them, a few days before the arrival of the first airlift of children from Prague.
