= 1905 Finsbury East by-election =

UK parliamentary by-election

← 1900	29 June 1905	1906 →
Candidate	Baker	Cohen
Party	Liberal	Conservative
Popular vote	2,320	1,552
Percentage	59.9%	40.1%
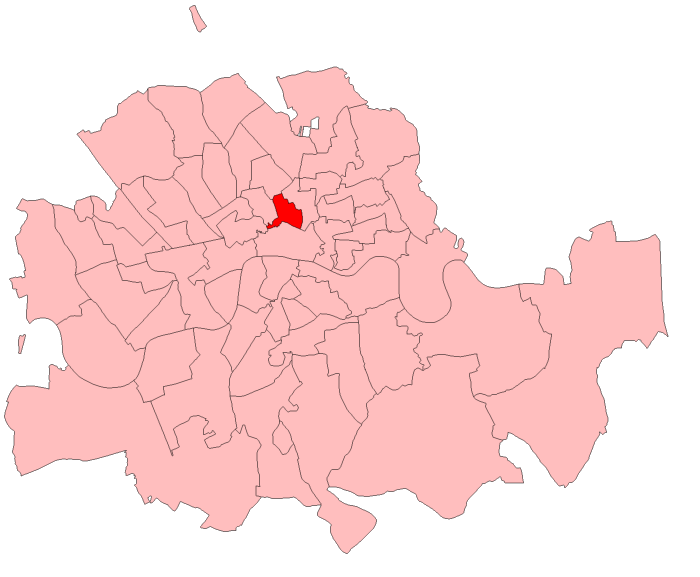
MP before election
Richards
Conservative
Subsequent MP
Baker
Liberal

The 1905 Finsbury East by-election was a Parliamentary by-election held on 29 June 1905. The constituency returned one Member of Parliament (MP) to the House of Commons of the United Kingdom, elected by the first past the post voting system.

== Vacancy ==
The vacancy came about due to the death of the sitting member, Henry Charles Richards on 1 June 1905. Richards died in a London nursing home of heart disease, aged 54. He had been Conservative MP for the seat of Finsbury East since the 1895 general election.

== Electoral history ==
The seat had been Conservative since Richards gained it in 1895 from the Liberals. He easily held the seat at the last election, with an increased vote share:

Richards

General election 1900: Finsbury East
Party	Candidate	Votes	%	±%
Conservative	Henry Charles Richards	2,174	54.3	+1.1
Liberal	Joseph Allen Baker	1,827	45.7	−1.1
Majority		347	8.6	+2.2
Turnout		4,001	70.5	−2.3
Conservative hold		Swing	+1.1	

== Candidates ==
The Conservatives selected Nathaniel Cohen as their candidate to defend the seat. He had contested the 1900 general election as Conservative candidate for Penryn and Falmouth.

The local Liberal Association re-selected 53-year-old Allen Baker to challenge for the seat. He was a Canadian- born engineer, specialising in machinery for the confectionery and bakery industries. He was a Quaker. Baker followed his father's professional footsteps and entered the family engineering business. In 1879 they set up business in Finsbury. As Quakers, the Baker family tried to run a model business taking a paternal interest in the welfare of their workforce and introducing schemes such as shorter working days, encouraging employees to participate in health and insurance plans and fostering a relaxed approach on the shop floor, perhaps to the detriment of profits. Baker and Sons also had connections to the motor car industry and in around 1902, the company held an agency for the American car manufacturers Stevens-Duryea. Baker had represented East Finsbury on the London County Council (LCC) as a Progressive since 1895. During his time on the LCC he acted as Chairman of the Highways Committee.

== Campaign ==
Polling Day was fixed for 29 June 1905, 28 days after the death of the previous member.

The Liberal campaign was launched with a visit from leading Liberal MP John Burns to speak on Allen Baker's platform.

The two candidates throughout the campaign were on the most cordial of terms. However, they differed on the key issue of trade. Cohen supported Chamberlain's Imperial Preference campaign for Tariff Reform. Allen Baker's Canadian background helped him to counter this policy in support of Free trade. At the previous General Election, Allen Baker had opposed the Boer War and that stance now seemed to be of help to his campaign.

On the eve of poll, David Lloyd George who spoke at Allen Baker's final meeting wound up the Radicals to a frenzy of excitement with one of the greatest of his election speeches.

== Result ==
Polling Day was wet, which usually told against the Liberal Party, but they gained the seat and recorded a massive 14.2% swing:

Baker

Finsbury East by-election, 1905
Party	Candidate	Votes	%	±%
Liberal	Joseph Allen Baker	2,320	59.9	+14.2
Conservative	Nathaniel Louis Cohen	1,552	40.1	−14.2
Majority		768	19.8	N/A
Turnout		3,872	73.0	+2.5
Liberal gain from Conservative		Swing	+14.2	

== Aftermath ==
At the 1906 general election, Baker and the Liberals held the seat with a slightly reduced majority:

General election January 1906: Finsbury East
Party	Candidate	Votes	%	±%
Liberal	Joseph Allen Baker	2,461	58.1	−1.8
Conservative	Alfred Cholmeley Earle Welby	1,772	41.9	+1.8
Majority		689	16.2	−3.6
Turnout		4,233	79.5	+6.5
Liberal hold		Swing	-1.8	

Cohen did not stand for parliament again, however he served on the London County Council representing the City of London from 1907 to 1911.
