= Angus McDonnell =

British politician, diplomat (1881–1966)

The Honourable Angus McDonnell CB CMG (7 June 1881 – 22 April 1966) was a British engineer, diplomat and Conservative Party politician.

== Early life ==
He was the second son of William Randal McDonnell, 6th Earl of Antrim, and Louisa McDonnell, Countess of Antrim. After his education at Eton College, he briefly entered business as a merchant banker with Morgan Grenfell. He subsequently moved to the United States, where he worked for Chiswell Langhorne in constructing railways in Virginia. McDonnell became a close friend of Langhorne's daughter Nancy Astor.

With the outbreak of the First World War, he served with the railway troops reserve of the 1st Canadian Division in constructing railways behind the lines of the Western Front and rose to the rank of colonel.

== Political career ==
He returned to the United Kingdom, where he was chosen by the Conservative Party to contest the constituency of Dartford at the 1924 general election. He narrowly defeated the sitting Labour Party member of parliament, John Edmund Mills. McDonnell had little interest in Parliament, did not defend the seat in 1929 and returned to his business activities.

== Washington honorary attaché ==
When America entered the Second World War in 1941, McDonnell was appointed Honorary Attaché to Washington, D.C. where he was able to use his personal and business contacts to assist Lord Halifax, British Ambassador to the United States. McDonnell was a capable aide to the British Ambassador, Lord Halifax. He would be the advance agent to Halifax's speeches and planned a punishing schedule of talks by the ambassador to the American public. His contacts enabled Halifax to further his influence in American political and commercial circles. The role of Ambassador was not one that came easily to Halifax, who greatly relied upon the aid that McDonnell provided.

== Personal life and death ==
He married actress Ethelwyne Sylvia Arthur Jones, the daughter of dramatist Henry Arthur Jones, on 13 December 1913. They had no issue, and she died in 1948. He died at 84 at his home in Tunbridge Wells, Kent, in April 1966.

== Links ==
- Leigh Rayment's Historical List of MPs

Parliament of the United Kingdom
Preceded by John Edmund Mills	Member of Parliament for Dartford; 1924–1929	Succeeded by John Edmund Mills
