= Octavius Coope =

English brewing partner and Conservative Member of Parliament

Octavius Edward Coope JP DL (12 January 1814 – 27 November 1886) was an English brewing partner and Conservative Member of Parliament 1847–1848 and 1874–1886.

Coope, born 12 January 1814, was the son of John Coope of Great Cumberland Place, London, and his wife Anna Maria.

== Career ==
In 1845 Octavius and his brother George joined the brewer Edward Ind to form the brewery company of Ind, Coope, and Co. Ltd which was based at Romford.

In 1847 he was elected as Member of Parliament for Great Yarmouth; the next year he was unseated on the proven bribery of some of his electors. He helped to endow the church of St. Paul, Bentley Common, and Crescent Road Infants' School, South Weald. He was a director of the Phoenix Fire and the Pelican Life Insurance Cos and a J.P. and Deputy Lieutenant for Essex.

Coope was next elected as MP for Middlesex in 1874. On 14 February 1881 he laid the foundation-stone for a new church at Brentwood. He held the Middlesex seat until 1885 when the constituency was reorganised. In 1885, he was elected as MP for Brentford; he held the constituency until his death in 1886.

=== Philanthropy ===
Coope was a major benefactor of St Mary Matfelon, Whitechapel. In 1873 the seventeenth-century church was found to be structurally unsafe, and the parish initially contemplated spending about £4,000 on repairs. In June 1874 Coope, who regarded himself as a Whitechapel parishioner through the offices and depot of his brewing firm Ind, Coope, and Co. Ltd in Osborn Street, offered up to £12,500 towards the construction of an entirely new church. He also presented plans prepared by his nephew, the architect Ernest Claude Lee, a former pupil of William Burges. Lee proposed a High Gothic Revival church of red brick with stone dressings, intended to seat about 1,400 people. The design proved controversial within the parish, particularly because of its red-brick construction and because some vestrymen wanted a larger building, while the estimated cost exceeded the amount Coope had offered. The vestry nevertheless accepted his proposal in September 1874.

Rebuilding began in 1875, and the new church was completed in October 1876 and consecrated in February 1877, while the upper part of the tower and its spire were later completed in 1878. The final cost was estimated at about £30,000; it was later said that approximately £10,000 of this cost was raised via public subscriptions, whilst Coope provided the remainder.

The new church was gutted by fire on 27 August 1880 after flames spread from the organ chamber into the roof. Coope again intervened, undertaking to use his influence to secure £16,800 in insurance money and to meet further rebuilding costs, on the condition that Lee redesign the interior to remedy the poor acoustics of the first church. The church was rebuilt in 1881–82 on substantially the same plan, but with a lower roof, a polygonal apse and a more elaborate interior. An alabaster reredos, which had originally been intended for the church in 1878, was finally completed in 1886–87 as a memorial to Coope following his death.

== Personal life ==
Coope married Emily Fulcher, daughter of British Indian Army Officer Captain Robert Page Fulcher Esq. of No. 70 Gloucester Place, Marylebone, in 1848. She survived her husband, and following her death in 1909 she was later buried alongside Octavius. The marriage produced six children, one son and five daughters.

- Edward Jesser Coope (1849–1924), who married Pleasance Susan Fellowes, daughter of the Rev. Thomas Lyon Fellowes, on 3 October 1872. He died at Forest Lodge, New Milton, Hampshire, on 12 March 1924.
- Mabel Coope (1854–1929), who married Archibald Weyland Ruggles-Brise, of Spains Hall, on 26 September 1876.
- Ada Caroline Coope (1856–1945), who married Sir William Francis George Guise, 5th Baronet of Elmore Court, Gloucestershire, on 23 August 1887.
- Emily Dora Coope (1859–1897), who married the Hon. Edwin Charles William Ponsonby, fifth son of Charles Ponsonby, 2nd Baron de Mauley, on 10 December 1878.
- Cicely Mary Coope (1861–1936), who married Algernon Leveson Elwes, maternal grandson of Admiral Sir Robert Howe Bromley, 3rd Baronet, on 7 December 1882.
- Alice Helen Coope (1865–1960), who married Claude Egerton Egerton-Green, a banker and later mayor of Colchester, in 1887.

=== Homes and residences ===
His main homes were Rochetts in South Weald, Essex; he purchased the manor house and 22-acre surrounding park for £28,000 in 1865. He purchased the lease of No. 41 Upper Brook Street, Mayfair, in 1863, which continued to be his London residence until his death in 1886.

In c. 1877 Coope also paid a rumoured £50,000 for Berechurch Hall and its 3,300-acre estate near Colchester in Essex. The existing house was subsequently demolished, and Coope commissioned a new manor house, which was completed in c. 1882, and was reportedly one of the first stately homes in the United Kingdom to have electricity installed. Following his death, Coope's executors sold the Berechurch Hall estate to Frederick Gordon in 1892.

=== Death and estate ===
Coope died on 27 November 1886 at the age of 72; his grave is located near the south-west corner of South Weald's churchyard. His epitaph reads The memory of the just is blessed.

His probate was sworn by his widow and others the next year at £542,784 (equivalent to about £61,700,000 in 2025).

The terms of his will distributed his estate amongst his family:

- His widow received £2,000, his leasehold interest in his London house at No. 41 Upper Brook Street, Mayfair, together with the furniture, effects, horses and carriages there and at Rochetts, and an annuity of £5,000 for so long as she remained his widow, in addition to provision already made for her under their marriage settlement. She was also given his pictures, works of art, books and engravings for life, with remainder to their children.
- Rochetts was left to his widow until the marriage of his daughter Ada Caroline Coope, after which Ada received a life interest in the estate. On Ada's death it was to revert to Coope's widow, if she survived, for life, and thereafter to the first son of Ada to attain the age of 21. A further annuity of £500 was provided to Ada to help maintain the estate.
- His son Edward Jesser Coope was to receive an annuity of £8,000 for life from the residuary estate, in addition to shares in Ind, Coope, and Co. Ltd which Octavius had previously paid for on his behalf. Edward was also given the power to appoint an annuity not exceeding £2,400 to his wife Pleasance Susan Coope if she survived him during her widowhood.
- £1,000 to each of his grandchildren.
- £100 to his two nephews.
- £40,000 in trust for each of his daughters Ada Caroline and Alice Helen Coope, of which £35,000 was permitted to remain loaned to Ind, Coope, and Co. Ltd, paying an interest rate of 6% annually.
- Durwards Hall and Appleford Farm in Essex were settled on his daughter Mabel Ruggles-Brise for life, with remainder to her first son to attain the age of 21, and failing this to his daughter Emily Dora Ponsonby and her children.
- He appointed his sons-in-law Archibald Ruggles-Brise and Algernon Leveson Elwes as directors of Ind, Coope, and Co. Ltd.
- Subject to the annuities, the residuary estate was left in trust in equal shares to his five daughters.

Parliament of the United Kingdom
Preceded by Charles Rumbold; William Wilshere	Member of Parliament for Great Yarmouth; 1847–1848; With: Lord Arthur Lennox	Succeeded by Charles Rumbold; Joseph Sandars
Preceded by Hon. George Byng; George Hamilton	Member of Parliament for Middlesex; 1874–1885; With: George Hamilton	Constituency divided
New constituency	Member of Parliament for Brentford; 1885–1886	Succeeded by James Bigwood
