= James Rowlands (politician) =

British politician

James Rowlands MP, circa 1900

James Rowlands (1 October 1851 – 1 March 1920) was a British Liberal or Lib-Lab politician. He served as Liberal Member of Parliament for East Finsbury and Dartford, Kent.

A son of William Bull Rowlands. He married in 1879 Kate Boyden who died in 1905. He was apprenticed to watch-case making. Early, he took an interest in politics; he organised registration in the borough of Finsbury. He was a member of the London Municipal Reform League, organising the Finsbury branch and becoming its Hon. Secretary. He was MP for East Finsbury, 1886–95. He was President of the Gas Consumers’ Protection League in 1893 and Secretary of Leaseholds Enfranchisement Association. He was elected at the General Election of 1906, defeating the Unionist MP and Father of the House, Rt Hon. Sir William Hart Dyke. He was defeated at the General Election of January 1910, but won his seat back at the General Election of December 1910. He sat in the House of Commons until his death in 1920. He took an active part in the international arbitration movement. He was a member of the last London School Board. He was Hon. Secretary of the Land Law Reform Association. He took an active part in Parliament in promoting Bills for reform of the land laws for town and country, and the housing question.

Parliament of the United Kingdom
| Preceded by James Bigwood | Member of Parliament for Finsbury East; 1886–1895 | Succeeded by Henry Charles Richards |
| Preceded by Sir William Hart Dyke | Member of Parliament for Dartford; 1906–January 1910 | Succeeded by William Foot Mitchell |
| Preceded by William Foot Mitchell | Member of Parliament for Dartford; December 1910–1920 | Succeeded by John Edmund Mills |
