= Arthur Black (Liberal politician) =

British businessman & politician (1863-1947)

Sir Arthur Black

Sir Arthur William Black (28 February 1863 – 13 July 1947) was an English lace manufacturer from Nottingham and a Liberal Party politician who served in local government in Nottingham before holding a seat in the House of Commons from 1906 to 1918.

== Career ==
Black was born in Nottingham, the son of William Edward Black. He was educated there before entering into business as a lace manufacturer in 1888, he later became a director of Turney Brothers and of the Sceptre Life Association. He was elected in 1895 to the Nottingham Town Council, becoming Sheriff from 1898 to 1899 and Mayor of Nottingham from 1902 to 1903, a Justice of the Peace and chairman of the Nottingham education committee.

As Chairman of the Nottingham Free Church Council in 1902 he shared a platform in a demonstration in Nottingham against the Education Bill which was addressed by the future Prime Minister H. H. Asquith. He was a member of Alfred Mosely's Commission of Inquiry into the educational systems of the United States in 1903, and visited the U.S. that year as part of the work of the commission. The Mosely Commission sought to learn from the American education system in the hope of bolstering Britain's industrial competitiveness in the face of growing industrial competition from Germany and the U.S., which they attributed to superior education. In 1909 he served as a member of the Royal Commission on international exhibitions.

=== Parliament ===
He first stood for Parliament unsuccessfully at the 1900 general election in the Doncaster division of the West Riding of Yorkshire, losing to the sitting Conservative MP by a margin of 2.8% of the votes.

At the 1906 general election he was elected as MP for the Biggleswade division of Bedfordshire, unseating the Liberal Unionist MP Lord Alwyne Compton by a majority of 23% of the votes. He was re-elected at both the January 1910 and December 1910 elections, though with more modest majorities of 4.8% of 5.8% respectively. The Bigglewsade division was abolished for the 1918 general election, when Black stood in the new Mid Bedfordshire division. However, his Conservative Party opponent Max Townley had received the coalition coupon, and took the seat with a majority of over 10%. After that defeat, Black did not stand for Parliament again.

He was knighted in 1916.

Black spoke out in 1930 against a proposal by the Labour Chancellor of the Exchequer Philip Snowden, to end the duty on imported lace. Although describing himself as a free trader, Black said that the end of the duty would be a "serious matter" for both workers and investors in the industry. He denied that the duty had led to higher prices, in the United Kingdom, saying that keen competition in the domestic market had prevented this.

== Charitable works ==
In 1935 Black donated a building known in Nottingham as 'Springfield' to the National Children's Home, and some ten years later he donated a further home called 'South Bank'. The Sir Arthur Black Charities in Nottingham continue to bear his name, awarding between £11,000 and £15,000 annually to causes in Nottingham in the years 2005 to 2009.

Parliament of the United Kingdom
Preceded by Lord Alwyne Compton	Member of Parliament for Biggleswade; 1906 – 1918	Constituency abolished
