= William Joynson-Hicks, 1st Viscount Brentford =

English politician and solicitor

The Right Honourable The Viscount Brentford PC PC (NI) DL
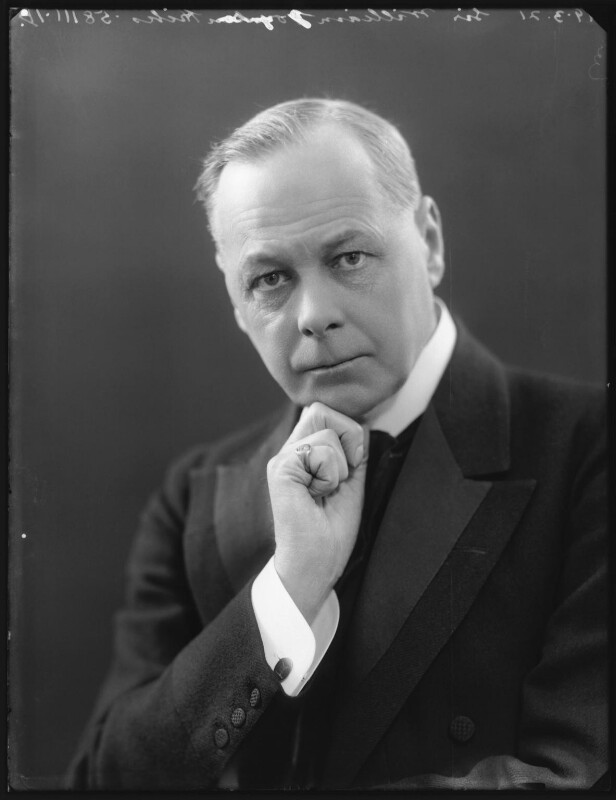

Home Secretary
- In office 7 November 1924 – 5 June 1929
- Prime Minister: Stanley Baldwin
- Preceded by: Arthur Henderson
- Succeeded by: J. R. Clynes

Minister of Health
- In office 27 August 1923 – 22 January 1924
- Prime Minister: Stanley Baldwin
- Preceded by: Neville Chamberlain
- Succeeded by: John Wheatley

Financial Secretary to the Treasury
- In office 25 May 1923 – 27 August 1923
- Prime Minister: Stanley Baldwin
- Preceded by: Archibald Boyd-Carpenter
- Succeeded by: Walter Guinness (from 5 October 1923)

Personal details
- Born: William Hicks; 23 June 1865 Plaistow Hall, Kent
- Died: 8 June 1932 (aged 66) London
- Party: Conservative
- Spouse: Grace Lynn Joynson (m. 1895)
- Education: Merchant Taylors' School

William Joynson-Hicks, 1st Viscount Brentford, PC, PC (NI), DL (23 June 1865 – 8 June 1932), known as Sir William Joynson-Hicks, Bt, from 1919 to 1929 and popularly known as Jix, was an English solicitor and Conservative Party politician.

He first attracted attention in 1908 when he defeated Winston Churchill, a Liberal Cabinet Minister at the time, in a by-election for the seat of North-West Manchester but is best known as a long-serving and controversial Home Secretary in Stanley Baldwin's Second Government from 1924 to 1929. He gained a reputation for pious authoritarianism, opposing Communism and clamping down on nightclubs and what he saw as indecent literature. He also played an important role in the fight against the introduction of the Church of England Revised Prayer Book, and in lowering the voting age for women from 30 to 21.

== Early life and career ==
=== Background and early life ===
William Hicks, as he was initially called, was born in Canonbury, London on 23 June 1865. He was the eldest of four sons and two daughters of Henry Hicks, of Plaistow Hall, Kent, and his wife Harriett, daughter of William Watts. Hicks was a prosperous merchant and senior evangelical Anglican layman who demanded the very best from his children.

William Hicks was educated at Merchant Taylors' School, London (1875–1881). He "took the pledge" (to abstain from alcohol) at the age of 14 and kept it all his life.

==== Marriage ====
In 1894, while on holiday, he met Grace Lynn Joynson, daughter of a Manchester silk manufacturer. Her father was also an evangelical Tory. They were married on 12 June 1895. In 1896 he added his wife's name "Joynson" to his surname.

==== Legal Career ====
After leaving school, Hicks was articled to a London solicitor between 1881 and 1887, before setting up his own practice in 1888. Initially he struggled to attract clients, but he was helped by his father's position as a leading member of the City Common Council and as Deputy Chairman of the London General Omnibus Company, for whom he did a great deal of claims work. His law firm was still operating as late as 1989, when a guide to the Copyright, Designs and Patents Act 1988 was published as Joynson-Hicks on UK Copyright.

In 1989, Joynson-Hicks merged with Taylor Garrett to form Taylor Joynson Garrett which itself merged with German law firm Wessing & Berenberg-Gossler to form Taylor Wessing in 2002.

=== Early attempts to enter Parliament ===
He joined the Conservative Party (at that time part of the Unionist coalition with the Liberal Unionists, which name it retained until 1925) and was selected as a Conservative Parliamentary candidate in 1898. He unsuccessfully contested seats in Manchester in the general elections of 1900 and 1906, losing to Winston Churchill on the latter occasion. On the latter occasion, he made anti-semitic speeches. At the time, there was an influx of Russian Jews fleeing from pogroms, which had caused Arthur Balfour's government to pass the Aliens Act 1905. In the 1906 election Joynson-Hicks advocated reform of workhouses and pensions for "the veteran of labour" but not for "the scallywag" (Churchill played down the idea that a Liberal government could set up a "mechanical" system of old age pensions, although it would eventually do so in 1908). Joynson-Hicks also claimed that a Liberal government, under the influence of Lloyd George, might disestablish the Church of England. Liberal posters in the constituency praised "Churchill and Free Trade", "Cheap Food" and "A United Empire". Churchill won by 1241 votes, a large majority for the time.

=== Motoring expert ===
Joynson-Hicks was an early authority on transport law, particularly motoring law. In 1906 he published "The Law of Heavy and Light Mechanical Traction on Highways". He was beginning to acquire a reputation as an evangelical lawyer with a perhaps paradoxical interest in the latest technology: motor cars (of which he owned several), telephones and aircraft.

In 1907 he became Chairman of the Motor Union, and presided over the merger with The Automobile Association in 1911, serving as chairman of the merged body until 1922. One of his first actions was to assert the legality of AA patrols warning motorists of police speed traps.

He was also President of the Lancashire Commercial Motor Users' Association of the National Threshing machine Owners' Association, and of the National Traction Engine Association.

He was also Treasurer of the Zenana Bible and Medical Mission and a member of the finance committee of the YMCA.

== 1908 by-election ==
Joynson-Hicks was elected to Parliament in a by-election in 1908, when Winston Churchill was obliged to submit to re-election in Manchester North West after his appointment as President of the Board of Trade, as the Ministers of the Crown Act 1908 required newly appointed Cabinet ministers to re-contest their seats. Cabinet ministers were normally returned unopposed, but as Churchill had crossed the floor from the Conservatives to the Liberals in 1904, the Conservatives were disinclined to allow him an uncontested return.

Ronald Blythe in "The Salutary Tale of Jix" in The Age of Illusion (1963) called it "the most brilliant, entertaining and hilarious electoral fight of the century". Joynson-Hicks' nickname "Jix" dates from this by-election. The election was notable for both the attacks of the Suffragette movement on Churchill, over his refusal to support legislation that would give women the vote, and Jewish hostility to Joynson-Hicks over his support for the controversial Aliens Act 1905 which aimed to restrict Jewish immigration.

Joynson-Hicks called Labour leader Keir Hardie "a leprous traitor" who wanted to sweep away the Ten Commandments. This prompted H. G. Wells to send an open letter to Labour sympathisers in Manchester, saying Joynson-Hicks "represents absolutely the worst element in British political life ... an entirely undistinguished man ... and an obscure and ineffectual nobody." Wells had endorsed Churchill, who admired his books and with whom he was in regular correspondence, as a potential social reformer.

Joynson-Hicks defeated Churchill by 429 votes. This provoked a strong reaction across the country with The Daily Telegraph running the front-page headline "Winston Churchill is OUT! OUT! OUT!" (Churchill shortly returned to Parliament as MP for Dundee.)

Joynson-Hicks gained personal notoriety in the immediate aftermath of this election for an address to his Jewish hosts at a dinner given by the Maccabean Society, during which he said "he had beaten them all thoroughly and soundly and was no longer their servant." Subsequent allegations that he was personally anti-Semitic formed an important strand of the authoritarian streak that many, including recent scholars David Cesarani and Geoffrey Alderman, detected in his speeches and behaviour. Cesarani cautioned that "although he may have been nicknamed 'Mussolini Minor', Jix was no fascist." Other work has disputed the notion that Joynson-Hicks was an anti-Semite, most notably a major article by W. D. Rubinstein which asserted that as Home Secretary Joynson-Hicks would later allow more Jews to be naturalised than any other holder of that office. Whether or not it was justified, the notion that Joynson-Hicks was an anti-Semite played a large part in his portrayal as a narrow-minded and intolerant man, most obviously in the work of Ronald Blythe.

== Early Parliamentary career ==
Joynson-Hicks lost his seat in the January 1910 general election. He contested Sunderland in the second general election in December that year, but was again defeated. He was returned unopposed for Brentford at a by-election in March 1911.

During World War I, he formed a Pals battalion within the Middlesex Regiment, the "Football Battalion". He acquired a reputation as a well-informed backbencher, an expert on aircraft and motors, badgering ministers about matters of aircraft design and production and methods of attacking Zeppelins. On 12 May 1915, he presented a petition to the Commons demanding the internment of enemy aliens of military age and the withdrawal from coastal areas of all enemy aliens. In 1916 he published a pamphlet The Command of the Air in which he advocated indiscriminate bombing of civilians in German cities, including Berlin. However, he was not offered a government post.

In 1918, his old constituency having been abolished, he became MP for Twickenham, holding the seat until his retirement from the House of Commons in 1929.

For his war work, he was created a Baronet, of Holmbury in the County of Surrey, in 1919.

== The Lloyd George coalition ==
In 1919–20 he went on an extended visit to the Sudan and India, which changed his political fortunes. At the time, there was considerable unrest in India and a rapid growth in the Home Rule movement, something Joynson-Hicks opposed due to the great economic importance of the Indian Empire to Britain. He at one time had commented "I know it is frequently said at missionary meetings that we conquered India to raise the level of the Indians. That is cant. We hold it as the finest outlet for British goods in general, and for Lancashire cotton goods in particular."

He emerged as a strong supporter of General Reginald Dyer over the Amritsar Massacre, and nearly forced the resignation of the Secretary of State for India, Edwin Montagu, over the motion of censure the government put down concerning Dyer's actions. This episode established his reputation as one of the "die-hards" on the right-wing of the party, and he emerged as a strong critic of the party's participation in a coalition government with the Liberal David Lloyd George.

As part of this campaign, he led an abortive attempt to block Austen Chamberlain's nomination as leader of the Unionist party on Bonar Law's retirement, putting forward Lord Birkenhead instead with the express aim of "splitting the coalition".

== Entering government ==
Joynson-Hicks played a small role in the fall of the Lloyd George Coalition, which he had so disliked, in October 1922. The refusal of many leading Conservatives, who had been supporters of the Coalition, to serve in Bonar Law's new government opened up promotion prospects. Joynson-Hicks was appointed Secretary for Overseas Trade (a junior minister, effectively deputy to the President of the Board of Trade). In the fifteen-month Conservative administration of first Bonar Law and then Stanley Baldwin, Joynson-Hicks was rapidly promoted. In March 1923, he became Paymaster General then Postmaster General, filling positions left vacant by the promotion of Neville Chamberlain.

When Stanley Baldwin became Prime Minister in May 1923, he initially also retained his previous position of Chancellor of the Exchequer while searching for a permanent successor. To relieve the burden of this position, he promoted Joynson-Hicks to Financial Secretary to the Treasury and included him in the Cabinet.

In that role, Joynson-Hicks was responsible for making the Hansard statement, on 19 July 1923, that the Inland Revenue would not prosecute a defaulting taxpayer who made a full confession and paid the outstanding tax, interest and penalties. Joynson-Hicks had hopes of eventually becoming Chancellor himself, but instead Neville Chamberlain was appointed to the post in August 1923. Once more, Joynson-Hicks filled the gap left by Chamberlain's promotion, serving as Minister of Health. He became a Privy Counsellor in 1923.

Following the hung parliament, amounting to a Unionist defeat in the general election of December 1923, Joynson-Hicks became a key figure in various intra-party attempts to oust Baldwin. At one time, the possibility of his becoming leader himself was discussed, but it seems to have been quickly discarded. He was involved in a plot to persuade Arthur Balfour that should the King seek his advice on whom to appoint Prime Minister, Balfour would advise him to appoint Austen Chamberlain or Lord Derby Prime Minister instead of Labour leader Ramsay MacDonald. The plot failed when Balfour refused to countenance such a move and the Liberals publicly announced they would support MacDonald, causing the government to fall in January 1924. MacDonald then became the first Labour Prime Minister.

== Home Secretary ==
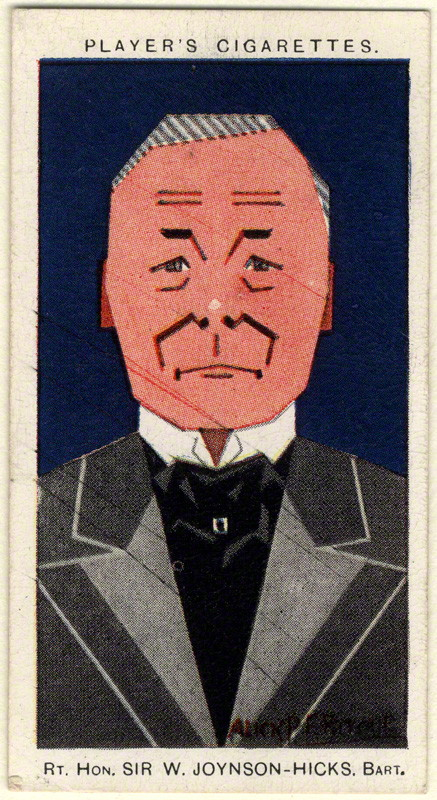
Cigarette card, 1926

The Conservatives returned to power in November 1924 and Joynson-Hicks was appointed as Home Secretary. Francis Thompson described him as "the most prudish, puritanical and protestant Home Secretary of the twentieth century". Promotion appears to have gone to his head somewhat and he allowed himself to be touted as a prospective party leader, a possibility which Leo Amery dismissed as "amazing" (October 1925). In his role as Home Secretary he was in attendance at the birth of Queen Elizabeth II in April 1926.

=== Public morals ===
Joynson-Hicks was portrayed as a reactionary for his attempts to crack down on night clubs and other aspects of the "Roaring Twenties". He was also heavily implicated in the banning of Radclyffe Hall's lesbian novel, The Well of Loneliness (1928), in which he took a personal interest.

He wanted to stem what he called "the flood of filth coming across the Channel". He clamped down on the work of D. H. Lawrence (he helped to force the publication of Lady Chatterley's Lover in an expurgated version), as well as on books on birth control and the translation of The Decameron. He ordered the raiding of nightclubs, where a great deal of after-hours drinking took place, with many members of fashionable society being arrested. The nightclub owner Kate Meyrick, proprietor of the 43 Club amongst other venues, was in and out of prison five times, her release parties being causes for big champagne celebrations. He instructed the head of London's Metropolitan Police, William Horwood that "it is a place of the most intense mischief and immorality [with] doped women and drunken men. I want you to put this matter in the hands of your most experienced men and whatever the cost will be, find out the truth about this club and if it is as bad as I am informed prosecute it with the utmost rigour of the law".

All of this was satirised in A. P. Herbert's one act play The Two Gentlemen of Soho (1927).

=== General strike and subversion ===
In 1925, he ordered a show trial of Harry Pollitt and a dozen other leading communists, using the Incitement to Mutiny Act 1797. During the general strike of 1926, he was a leading organiser of the systems that maintained supplies and law and order, although there is some evidence that left to himself he would have pursued a more hawkish policy – most notably, his repeated appeals for more volunteer constables and his attempt to close down the Daily Herald.

Having been a hardliner during the general strike, he remained a staunch anti-communist thereafter, although the left appear to have warmed a little to him over the Prayer Book controversy. Against the wishes of Foreign Secretary Austen Chamberlain he ordered a police raid on the Soviet trade agency ARCOS in 1927, apparently actually hoping to rupture Anglo-Soviet relations. He was popular with the police and on his retirement a portrait of him was erected in Scotland Yard, paid for by police subscription.

=== Prayer Book crisis ===
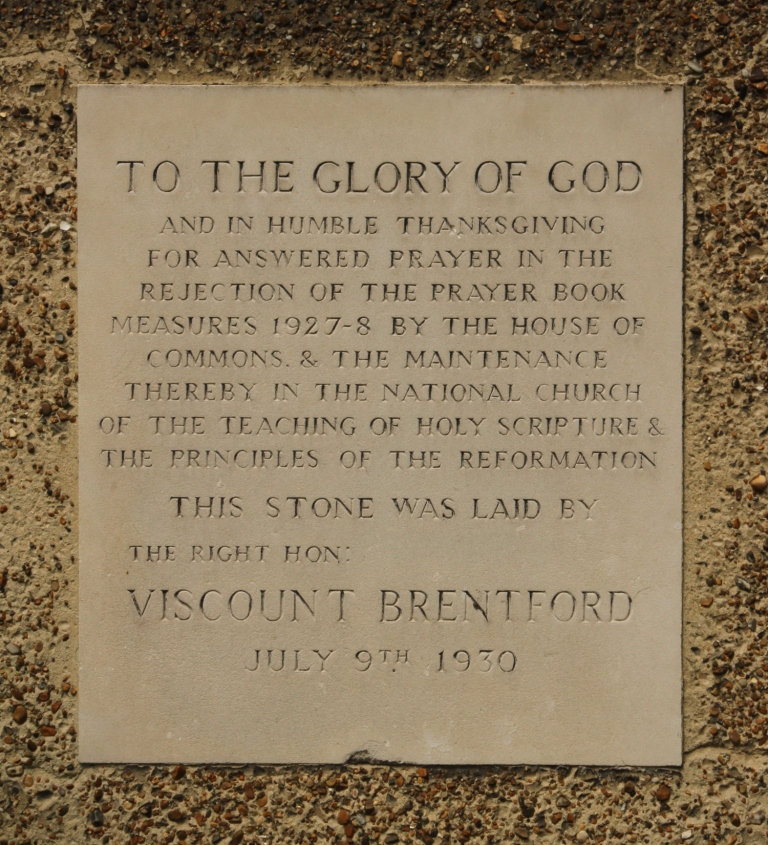
Plaque at St Andrew's parish church, Felixstowe, Suffolk, commemorating the defeat of the 1928 Prayer Book in the House of Commons

In 1927 Joynson-Hicks turned his fire on the proposed revision of the Book of Common Prayer. The law required Parliament to approve such revisions, normally regarded as a formality. Joynson-Hicks had been President of the evangelical National Church League since 1921, and he went against Baldwin's wishes in opposing the Revised Prayer Book.

When the Prayer Book came before the House of Commons Joynson-Hicks argued strongly against its adoption as he felt it strayed far from the Protestant principles of the Church of England. He likened the Revised Prayer Book to "papistry", as he believed that the reservation of sacrament implied a belief in transubstantiation. The debate on the Prayer Book is regarded as one of the most eloquent ever seen in the Commons, and resulted in the rejection of the revised Prayer Book in 1927. His allies were an alliance of ultra-Protestant Tories and nonconformist Liberals and Labour, and some of them likened him to John Hampden or Oliver Cromwell. It was said that no such occasion had been seen since the anti-Catholic agitation of 1850–51 or, some said, since the late seventeenth century crises over Exclusion or Titus Oates.

A further revised version (the "Deposited Book") was submitted in 1928 but rejected again.

Many leading Church of England figures came to feel that disestablishment would become necessary to guard the Church against this sort of political interference. Joynson-Hicks' book The Prayer Book Crisis, published in May 1928, correctly forecast that the bishops would back off from demanding disestablishment, for fear of losing their state-provided salaries and endowments. However, the National Assembly of the Church of England then declared an emergency, and this was argued as a pretext for the use of the 1928 Prayer Book in many churches for decades afterwards, an act of questionable legality.

=== Votes for young women ===
Off the cuff and without Cabinet discussion, in a debate on a private member's bill on 20 February 1925, Joynson-Hicks pledged equal voting rights for women (clarifying a pronouncement of Baldwin's in the 1924 general election).

Joynson-Hicks' 1933 biographer wrote that the claim that Joynson-Hicks' parliamentary pledge to Lady Astor in 1925 had committed the party to giving votes to young women was an invention of Winston Churchill that has entered popular mythology but has no basis in fact. However, Francis Thompson (2004) wrote that the Baldwin government would probably not have taken action without Joynson-Hicks' pledge.

Joynson-Hicks personally moved the second reading of the Representation of the People (Equal Franchise) Act 1928 and was also responsible for piloting it through Parliament. He made a strong speech in support of the bill, which lowered the voting age for women from 30 to 21 (the same age as men at the time), and which was blamed in part for the Conservatives' unexpected electoral defeat the following year, which the right of the party attributed to newly enfranchised young women (referred to derogatorily as "flappers") voting for the opposition Labour party.

=== Reforms ===
Throughout his tenure at the Home Office, Joynson-Hicks was involved in the reform of the penal system – in particular, the borstals and the introduction of a legal requirement for all courts to have a probation officer. He made a point of visiting all the prisons in the country, and was often dismayed by what he found there. He made a concerted effort to improve the conditions of the prisons under his jurisdiction, and earned a compliment from persistent offender and night-club owner Kate Meyrick, who noted in her memoirs that prisons had improved considerably thanks to his efforts.

Joynson-Hicks sided with Churchill over the general strike and India, but parted company with him on the topic of greyhound racing, which Joynson-Hicks believed served a useful social function in getting poor people out of the pubs. He also thought that Churchill's view that totalisers were permissible for horse-racing but not for greyhounds smacked of one law for the rich and another for the poor.

He became something of a hero to shop workers because of the Shops (Hours of Closing) Act 1928, which banned working after 8pm and required employers to grant a half day holiday each week. He also repealed a regulation to allow chocolates to be sold in the first interval of theatre performances as well as the second.

In August 1928, Lord Beaverbrook thought Joynson-Hicks the only possible successor to Baldwin. However, he was a figure of fun to many of the public and most of his colleagues thought the idea of him as Prime Minister, in F. M. L. Thompson's view, "ridiculous". He was praised in the popular press and ridiculed in the upmarket weeklies. He insisted that he did not favour full censorship, and in his 1929 pamphlet Do We Need A Censor? he recorded that he had ordered the police to stamp out indecency in Hyde Park so that it would be safe for "a man to take his daughter for a walk" there.

Joynson-Hicks was concerned at the electoral popularity of Lloyd George's plan to cut unemployment through public works, as contained in the pamphlet "We Can Conquer Unemployment" and the Orange Book. He wrote to Churchill, then Chancellor of the Exchequer, on 6 February 1929, enclosing a memorandum proposing a programme of public works financed by a government loan. Churchill poured cold water on the idea.

== Later career ==
As the time for a new general election loomed, Baldwin contemplated reshuffling his Cabinet to move Churchill from the Exchequer to the India Office, and asking all ministers older than himself (Baldwin was born in 1867) to step down, with the exception of Sir Austen Chamberlain. Joynson-Hicks would have been one of those asked to retire from the Cabinet if the Conservatives had been re-elected.

The Conservatives unexpectedly lost power at the general election in May 1929. A month after the election Joynson-Hicks was raised to the peerage as the Viscount Brentford, of Newick in the County of Sussex in the Dissolution Honours (necessitating a by-election at which the Conservatives narrowly held his old seat).

Lord Brentford remained a senior figure in the Conservative Party, but due to his declining health he was not invited to join the National Government at its formation in August 1931. As late as October 1931 Lord Beaverbrook urged him to set up a Conservative Shadow Cabinet, as an alternative to the National Government. The National Government was reconstructed in November 1931, but again he was not offered a return to office.

== Family ==
Lord Brentford married Grace Lynn, only daughter of Richard Hampson Joynson, JP, of Bowdon Cheshire, on 12 June 1895 in St. Margaret's Church, Westminster. They had two sons and one daughter.

Joynson-Hicks died at Newick Park, Sussex, on 8 June 1932, aged 66. His wealth at death was £67,661 5s 7d (equivalent to £4,083,414 in 2025).

His widow the Viscountess Brentford died in January 1952. He was succeeded by his eldest son, Richard. His youngest son, the Hon. Lancelot (who succeeded in the viscountcy in 1958), was also a Conservative politician.

== Reputation ==
Joynson-Hicks' Victorian top hat and frock coat made him seem an old-fashioned figure, but he came to be regarded with a certain affection by the public. William Bridgeman, his predecessor as Home Secretary, wrote of him "There is something of the comedian in him, which is not intentional but inevitably apparent, which makes it hard to take him as seriously as one might". Churchill wrote of him "The worst that can be said about him is that he runs the risk of being most humorous when he wishes to be most serious". After his death Leo Amery wrote that "he was a very likeable fellow" whilst Stanley Baldwin observed "he may have said many foolish things but he rarely did one".

Although Joynson-Hicks was Home Secretary, a notoriously difficult office to hold, for some four and a half years, he is frequently overlooked by both historians and politicians. His length of tenure was exceeded in the twentieth century only by Chuter Ede, R. A. Butler and Herbert Morrison, yet he was not included in a list of long-serving Home Secretaries presented to Jack Straw in 2001 on his departure from the Home Office. He is also virtually the only major politician of the 1920s not to have been accorded a recent biography.

For many years detailed discussion of Joynson-Hicks' life and career was hampered by the inaccessibility of his papers, which were kept by the Brentford family. This meant the discourse on his life was shaped by the official biography of 1933 by H. A. Taylor, and by material published by his contemporaries – much of it published by people who hated him. As a result, public discourse has been shaped by material that portrayed him in an unflattering light, such as Ronald Blythe's biographical chapter in The Age of Illusion.

In the 1990s the current Viscount lent his grandfather's papers to an MPhil student at the University of Westminster, Jonathon Hopkins, who prepared a catalogue of them and wrote a short biography of Joynson-Hicks as part of his thesis. In 2007, a number of these papers were deposited with the East Sussex Record Office in Lewes (which transferred to The Keep in Brighton in 2013) where they are available to the public. Huw Clayton, whose PhD thesis concerned Joynson-Hicks' moral policies at the Home Office, has announced that he plans to write a new biography of Joynson-Hicks with the aid of these sources. An article on Joynson-Hicks, written by Clayton, has since appeared in the Journal of Historical Biography.

In 2023, historian Max Hastings wrote a Times article suggesting that those who consider some current Tory ministers and ex-ministers to be the "worst ever" to revisit Joynson-Hicks' career and perhaps conclude that "more than a few of our past politicians make the present ones look ... not as awful as Jix".

== Arms ==
Coat of arms of William Joynson-Hicks, 1st Viscount Brentford
Crest A stag's head Proper gorged with a collar Or thereon five roses Gules and charged in the neck with a fleur-de-lis Gold. Escutcheon Gules on a fess wavy between three fleurs-de-lis Or a portcullis Sable all within a bordure of the second. Supporters On either side a stag Proper gorged with a collar Or thereon five roses Gules and charged on the neck with a fleur-de-lis Gold. Motto Cassis Tutissima Virtus

== Bibliography ==
- Blythe, Ronald (1963). "Ch. 2. The Salutary Tale of Jix". The Age of Illusion: England in the Twenties and Thirties 1919–1940. London: Hamish Hamilton.
- Jenkins, Roy (1987). Baldwin. Bloomsbury Press: HarperCollins. ISBN 978-0002175869.
- Thompson, F. M. L. (2004). "William Joynson-Hicks". In Matthew, Colin (ed.). Dictionary of National Biography. Vol. 27. Oxford: Oxford University Press. ISBN 978-0198614111.
- Rose, Jonathan (2014). The Literary Churchill. London: Yale University Press. ISBN 978-0-300-20407-0.
- Taylor, H. A. (1933). Jix, Viscount Brentford: being the authoritative and official biography of the Rt. Hon. William Joynson-Hicks, First Viscount Brentford of Newick. London: Stanley Paul.
- Toye, Richard (2008). Lloyd George and Churchill: Rivals for Greatness. London: Pan Macmillan. ISBN 978-0-330-43472-0.

Parliament of the United Kingdom
Preceded by Winston Churchill	Member of Parliament for Manchester North West; 1908–January 1910	Succeeded by George Kemp
Preceded by Lord Alwyne Compton	Member of Parliament for Brentford; 1911–1918	Constituency abolished
New constituency	Member of Parliament for Twickenham; 1918–1929	Succeeded by John Ferguson
Political offices
Preceded by Archibald Boyd-Carpenter	Financial Secretary to the Treasury; 1923	Succeeded by Walter Guinness
Preceded by Neville Chamberlain	Paymaster General; 1923	Succeeded by Archibald Boyd-Carpenter
Preceded by Neville Chamberlain	Postmaster General; 1923	Succeeded by Sir Laming Worthington-Evans
Preceded by Neville Chamberlain	Minister of Health; 1923–1924	Succeeded by John Wheatley
Preceded by Arthur Henderson	Home Secretary; 1924–1929	Succeeded by J. R. Clynes
Peerage of the United Kingdom
New creation	Viscount Brentford; 1929–1932	Succeeded by Richard Cecil Joynson-Hicks
Baronetage of the United Kingdom
New creation	Baronet (of Holmbury); 1919–1932	Succeeded by Richard Cecil Joynson-Hicks
