= Brentford (constituency) =

Parliamentary constituency in the United Kingdom, 1885–1918

- Former county constituency for the House of Commons
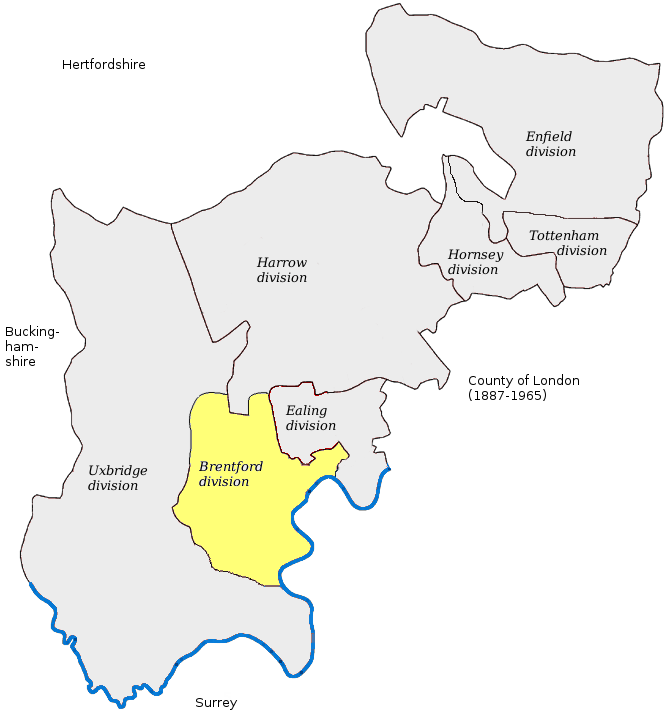

1885–1918
- Seats: one
- Created from: Middlesex
- Replaced by: Brentford and Chiswick; Twickenham

Brentford was a constituency named after the town of Brentford in Middlesex and was drawn to take in Hounslow, Norwood Green and Twickenham. It returned one Member of Parliament (MP) to the House of Commons of the UK Parliament. The constituency was created for the 1885 general election and abolished for that of 1918.

== Boundaries ==
The local government district of Brentford, the civil parishes of Heston, Isleworth, Norwood (also known as Norwood Green), and Twickenham, and part of the civil parish of Hanwell.

Context

The constituency was in the south-west of Middlesex, in present outer-southwest London. It was one of seven divisions of a soon-to-be County of London). It was named after its medieval market town of Brentford, on the north (Middlesex) bank of the River Thames. The seat bordered the Ealing division to the north and north-east, Kingston to the south-east and Uxbridge from the north-west to south-west.

Brentford had been the husting place for the two-member county of Middlesex since 1700, 155 years after the formation of the second breakaway urban division of Middlesex, the two-member seat of Westminster. The county as a whole saw 47 members replacing 18 before 1885, the greatest absolute rise of any county at a national boundary review.

Successors

Both of the seat's successors took in parts of an adjoining Middlesex division (seat).

Present administrative tiers

In 1965 the area of this old division became parts of the London Boroughs of Hounslow, Richmond upon Thames and Ealing.

== Members of Parliament ==
Year	Member	Party
1885	Octavius Coope	Conservative
1886	James Bigwood	Conservative
1906	Vickerman Rutherford	Liberal
1910	Lord Alwyne Compton	Conservative
1911	William Joynson-Hicks	Conservative
1918	constituency abolished	

== Elections ==
=== Elections in the 1880s ===
General election 1885: Brentford
Party	Candidate	Votes	%	±%
Conservative	Octavius Coope	3,563	61.1	
Liberal	James Haysman	2,267	38.9	
Majority		1,296	22.2	
Turnout		5,830	73.1	
Registered electors		7,971		
Conservative win (new seat)				

General election 1886: Brentford
Party	Candidate	Votes	%	±%
Conservative	Octavius Coope	3,043	68.4	+7.3
Liberal	James Haysman	1,409	31.6	−7.3
Majority		1,634	36.8	+14.6
Turnout		4,452	55.9	−17.2
Registered electors		7,971		
Conservative hold		Swing	+7.3	

Coope's death caused a by-election.

By-election, 23 Dec 1886: Brentford
Party	Candidate	Votes	%	±%
Conservative	James Bigwood	2,572	66.2	−2.2
Liberal	James Haysman	1,316	33.8	+2.2
Majority		1,256	32.4	−4.4
Turnout		3,888	48.8	−7.1
Registered electors		7,971		
Conservative hold		Swing	−2.2	

=== Elections in the 1890s ===
Bigwood

General election 1892: Brentford
Party	Candidate	Votes	%	±%
Conservative	James Bigwood	4,417	62.7	−5.7
Liberal	Harry Heldmann	2,625	37.3	+5.7
Majority		1,792	25.4	−11.4
Turnout		7,042	70.6	+14.7
Registered electors		9,975		
Conservative hold		Swing	-3.5	

General election 1895: Brentford
Party	Candidate	Votes	%	±%
Conservative	James Bigwood	Unopposed		
Conservative hold				

=== Elections in the 1900s ===
General election 1900: Brentford
Party	Candidate	Votes	%	±%
Conservative	James Bigwood	Unopposed		
Conservative hold				

Rutherford

General election 1906: Brentford
Party	Candidate	Votes	%	±%
Liberal	Vickerman Rutherford	6,506	51.8	New
Conservative	James Bigwood	6,053	48.2	N/A
Majority		453	3.6	N/A
Turnout		12,559	73.2	N/A
Registered electors		17,153		
Liberal gain from Conservative		Swing	N/A	

=== Elections in the 1910s ===
General election January 1910: Brentford
Party	Candidate	Votes	%	±%
Conservative	Alwyne Compton	10,675	61.0	+12.8
Liberal	Vickerman Rutherford	6,819	39.0	−12.8
Majority		3,856	22.0	N/A
Turnout		17,494	84.5	+11.3
Registered electors		20,701		
Conservative gain from Liberal		Swing	+12.8	

General election December 1910: Brentford
Party	Candidate	Votes	%	±%
Conservative	Alwyne Compton	9,199	60.0	−1.0
Liberal	William George Lobjoit	6,124	40.0	+1.0
Majority		3,075	20.0	−2.0
Turnout		15,323	74.0	−10.5
Registered electors		20,701		
Conservative hold		Swing	-1.0	

1911 Brentford by-election
Party	Candidate	Votes	%	±%
Conservative	William Joynson-Hicks	Unopposed		
Conservative hold				

General Election 1914–15:

Another General Election was required to take place before the end of 1915. The political parties had been making preparations for an election to take place and by July 1914, the following candidates had been selected:

- Unionist: William Joynson-Hicks
- Liberal: William George Lobjoit

== Sources ==
- Boundaries of Parliamentary Constituencies 1885-1972, compiled and edited by F.W.S. Craig (Parliamentary Reference Publications 1972)
- British Parliamentary Election Results 1885-1918, compiled and edited by F.W.S. Craig (The Macmillan Press 1974)
- Leigh Rayment's Historical List of MPs – Constituencies beginning with "B" (part 5)
