= 1920 Sunderland by-election =

UK Parliamentary by-election

← 1918	24 April 1920	1922 →

Candidate	Greenwood	Rutherford	Howe
Party	National Liberal	Labour	Liberal
Popular vote	22,813	14,379	5,065
Percentage	54.0%	34.0%	12.0%
MP before election
Thompson
Liberal
Subsequent MP
Greenwood
National Liberal

The 1920 Sunderland by-election was held on 24 April 1920. The by-election was held due to the incumbent Coalition Liberal MP, Hamar Greenwood, being appointed Chief Secretary for Ireland. It was retained by Greenwood.

1920 Sunderland by-election
Party	Candidate	Votes	%	±%
National Liberal	Hamar Greenwood	22,813	54.0	+10.1
Labour	Vickerman Rutherford	14,379	34.0	+18.7
Liberal	E.M. Howe	5,065	12.0	−31.9
Majority		8,434	20.0	−8.6
Turnout		42,257	55.4	−1.0
National Liberal hold		Swing	-4.3	
