= British Society for the Propagation of the Gospel Among the Jews =

The British Society for Propagating the Gospel Among the Jews founded London 1842, was the Presbyterian and dissenting churches' counterpart to the Anglican London Society for Promoting Christianity Among the Jews (founded 1809, today CMJ). The two societies were in large part identical, but representing high-church and low-church traditions in British Christianity. Among the founders of the low-church body in 1846 was Ridley Haim Herschell, who also founded Trinity Chapel on the Edgware Road and the Evangelical Alliance.

The Society published a periodical called the Jewish Herald. It was renamed the International Society for the Evangelisation of the Jews, and later merged with the Barbican Mission to the Jews to form Christian Witness to Israel which was renamed International Mission to Jewish People in 2020.
