= James Bigwood =

British politician

Bigwood in 1895.

James Bigwood (1839 – 6 December 1919) was an English manufacturer and Conservative politician.

Bigwood was born at Bristol. He was educated at Cotham, Bristol and at St John's College, Cambridge (BA. 1853, MA. 1866). He became a partner in the firm of Champion & Co. mustard and vinegar manufacturers located in Finsbury. He was a member of the Society of Chemical Industry and a strong proponent of food product purity. Bigwood married Marian Webb of Torquay in 1862.

In the 1885 general election, Bigwood was elected member of parliament for Finsbury East with a lead of 20 votes but lost the seat against the trend in the 1886 general election by 61 votes.

He was elected MP for Brentford in a by election in 1886 and held it until the 1906 general election. On 17 January 1906 he was appointed a deputy lieutenant of Middlesex.

Bigwood lived at Twickenham and died at the age of 80 on 6 December 1919.

Parliament of the United Kingdom
New constituency	Member of Parliament for Finsbury East; 1885–1886	Succeeded by James Rowlands
Preceded by Octavius Coope	Member of Parliament for Brentford; 1886–1906	Succeeded by Vickerman Rutherford
