= Vickerman Rutherford =

British Liberal politician and medical doctor

Member of Parliament for Brentford
- In office 1906–1910
- Preceded by: James Bigwood
- Succeeded by: Lord Alwyne Compton

Personal details
- Born: 6 December 1860
- Died: 25 April 1934 (aged 73)
- Education: Sidney Sussex College, Cambridge

Vickerman Henzell Rutherford (6 December 1860 – 25 April 1934) was a British Liberal politician and medical doctor.

== Education ==
He was educated at Royal High School, Edinburgh and Sidney Sussex College, Cambridge.

== Career ==
He first stood for parliament at the 1900 General Election as Liberal Party candidate for Osgoldcross. He was then elected Member of Parliament (MP) for Brentford at the 1906 General Election. He was defeated at the January 1910 General election and did not contest the General Election in December 1910. He sought a return to parliament at the 1918 General Election when he stood as Liberal candidate at Bishop Auckland, without the support of the Coalition government 'coupon'. Coalition government endorsement was instead given to another Liberal candidate and as a result Rutherford finished third. He switched his support to the Labour Party and contested the 1920 by-election in Sunderland and finished second.

=== Electoral record ===
General election 1900: Osgoldcross
Party	Candidate	Votes	%	±%
Independent Liberal	John Austin	5,609	65.0	−1.8
Liberal	Vickerman Rutherford	3,025	35.0	+1.8
Majority		2,584	30.0	−3.6
Turnout			58.8	−3.4
Independent Liberal hold		Swing	-1.8	

General election 1906: Brentford
Party	Candidate	Votes	%	±%
Liberal	Vickerman Rutherford	6,506	51.8	n/a
Conservative	James Bigwood	6,053	48.2	n/a
Majority		453	3.6	n/a
Turnout			73.2	n/a
Liberal gain from Conservative		Swing	n/a	

General election 1918: Bishop Auckland
Party	Candidate	Votes	%	±%
Labour	Ben Spoor	10,060		
National Liberal	Godfrey Vick	7,417		
Liberal	Vickerman Rutherford	2,411		
Majority				
Turnout				
Labour hold		Swing		

General election 1922: Sunderland
Party	Candidate	Votes	%	±%
Unionist	✓ Walter Raine	28,001	25.0	n/a
Unionist	✓ Luke Thompson	24,591	22.0	n/a
National Liberal	Hamar Greenwood	19,058	17.0	n/a
Labour	David Baxter Lawley	13,683	12.2	n/a
Labour	Vickerman Rutherford	13,490	12.1	n/a
Liberal	Andrew Common	13,036	11.7	n/a
Turnout			81.6	+26.2
Majority		5,533	5.0	n/a
Unionist hold		Swing	n/a	
Majority				n/a
Unionist gain from Liberal		Swing	n/a	

Parliament of the United Kingdom
Preceded by James Bigwood	Member of Parliament for Brentford; 1906 – Jan 1910	Succeeded by Lord Alwyne Compton
