= 1918 Finsbury East by-election =

UK parliamentary by-election

← Dec. 1910	16 July 1918	Dec. 1918 →

Constituency of Finsbury East
- Turnout: 38.7%
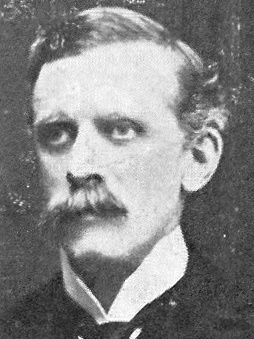
	First party	Second party	Third party
		Ind.	Ind.
Candidate	Evan Cotton	H. S. Spencer	A. S. Belsher
Party	Liberal	Independent	Independent
Popular vote	1,156	576	199
Percentage	59.9%	29.8%	10.3%
Swing	▲8.3%	N/A	N/A
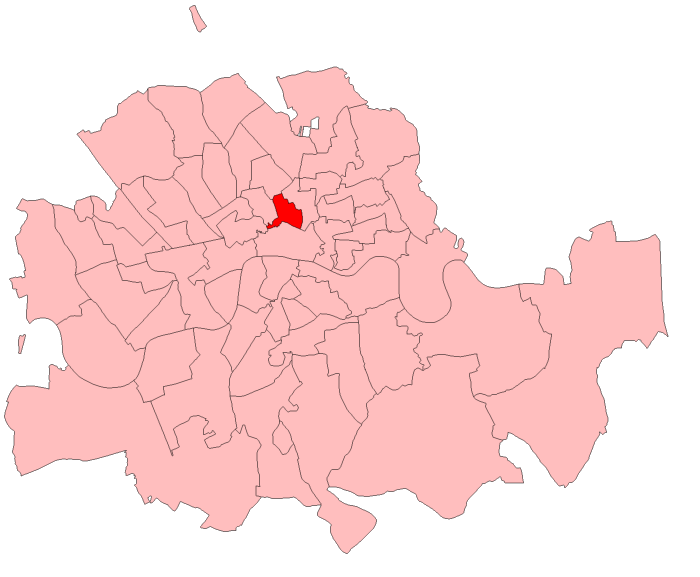
- A map of parliamentary constituencies within the County of London at the time of the by-election, with Finsbury East highlighted in red.
MP before election
Allen Baker
Liberal
Subsequent MP
Evan Cotton
Liberal

The 1918 Finsbury East by-election was a parliamentary by-election held for the UK House of Commons constituency of East Finsbury in north London on 16 July 1918.

== Vacancy ==
The by-election was caused by the death on 3 July 1918 of the sitting Liberal Party MP Joseph Allen Baker, who had held the seat since himself winning it in a by-election on 29 June 1905.

== Electoral history ==
General election December 1910: Finsbury, East
Party	Candidate	Votes	%	±%
Liberal	Joseph Allen Baker	2,023	51.6	+0.6
Conservative	William Mason	1,900	48.4	−0.6
Majority		123	3.2	+1.2
Turnout		3,923	80.8	−4.0
Liberal hold		Swing	+0.6	

== Candidates ==
Evan Cotton

=== Liberals ===
Finsbury Liberal Association adopted Evan Cotton as their candidate to replace Baker. Cotton was born in India, the son of Henry John Stedman Cotton, a colonial administrator and himself a Liberal MP who sat for Nottingham East from 1906 to 1910. H. E. A. Cotton was then aged 50 years and had been Progressive Party member of the London County Council for East Finsbury since 1910. He was a barrister, having been called to the bar at Lincoln's Inn in 1893 and a journalist.

=== Conservatives ===
As participants in the wartime coalition with Prime Minister David Lloyd George, the Conservatives chose not to contest the by-election and endorsed Cotton as the government candidate.

=== Labour ===
Even though the Labour party had withdrawn from the wartime electoral truce, they too chose not to contest the election.

=== Independents ===
Mr Charles Lamble, the Chairman of the Government Temporary Clerks' Association, announced he would be standing in the election. He said he would stand as a supporter of the government but that he would be pressing for the redress of existing grievances in the Civil Service and the immediate implementation of the Whitley Report – an inquiry into the feasibility of setting up Industrial Councils in industry and administration to improve industrial relations and increase efficiency. However, in the end, Lamble decided not to fight the election.

There were however two Independents who did contest the by-election. Mr A S Belsher was a solicitor's managing clerk and Chairman of the London Licensed Victuallers Central Protection Board. Belsher had obtained the support of the Merchant Seamen's League. The League had resolved to boycott German goods after the war in retaliation for the U-Boat attacks on merchant shipping. They could not get Cotton to support their cause so switched allegiance to Belsher.

The second Independent was H S Spencer, an honorary Captain in the Royal Irish Fusiliers and an examiner in the Aeronautical Inspection Directorate of the Royal Air Force. Spencer was said to have the support of the Vigilante Society, an extreme right-wing group which campaigned against enemy aliens and what they described as 'naturalised enemies' in Britain. They wanted the British Empire to be reserved for what they called British people.

== Issues ==
The only real issue seems to have been the prosecution of the war and the nationalistic atmosphere the war was stirring up against the Germans. The candidates were all competing to see who would come across toughest on measures such as the Defence of the Realm Act, internment of enemy aliens or boycotting of goods and services from those who were German or believed to have German ancestry. This mood continued right up until polling day with the two Independent candidates' supporters engaged in rowdyism and violence against each other.

== Result ==
In a wartime contest on a clearly out of date electoral register Cotton easily retained the seat for the government with a majority of 580 votes over Spencer. Turnout was only 38.7%.

Finsbury East by-election, 1918: 16 July 1918
Party	Candidate	Votes	%	±%
Liberal	Evan Cotton	1,156	59.9	+8.3
Independent	H. S. Spencer	576	29.8	New
Independent	A. S. Belsher	199	10.3	New
Majority		580	30.1	+26.9
Turnout		1,931	38.7	−42.1
Liberal hold		Swing	N/A	

The result was an endorsement by the electorate for the government's handling of the war effort, both in military terms and on the home front. Cotton's vote was also seen as a rejection of the kind of political violence which had marred the by-election and which was chiefly associated with the campaigns of Spencer and Belsher. The Times newspaper reported that Cotton had not been a good candidate, a weak campaigner and inconsistent on the German boycott. They reported that although he was selected to represent the government under the party truce it was likely on his record that he would gravitate to the opposition, i.e. to the rival wing of the Liberal Party led by H H Asquith. The message The Times believed the government should take from the election was to have 'stout-hearted and patriotic candidates' in the field come the general election.

== Aftermath ==
As far as East Finsbury and Cotton were concerned, however, the election was an academic exercise. The constituency disappeared in boundary changes at the 1918 general election just a few months later. Cotton, contested the successor seat of Finsbury but he was not awarded the Coupon which went to Lt-Col. Martin Archer-Shee DSO. Archer-Shee had been MP for Finsbury Central since 1910. Clearly the government whips felt Archer-Shee fitted that description better than Cotton, who was defeated;

Finsbury General Election, 1918 Electorate 34,873
Party	Candidate	Votes	%	±%
Unionist	Martin Archer-Shee	8,732	63.8	N/A
Liberal	Evan Cotton	4,981	36.2	N/A
Majority		3,801	27.6	N/A
Turnout		13,763	39.5	+0.8
Unionist gain from Liberal		Swing		

Cotton continued his career in London government, becoming an Alderman of the LCC. He then went back to India where he served as President of the Bengal Legislature from 1922 to 1925.

== See also ==
- List of United Kingdom by-elections
- United Kingdom by-election records
