= 1911 Brentford by-election =

UK parliamentary by-election

The 1911 Brentford by-election was a Parliamentary by-election held on 23 March 1911. It returned one Member of Parliament (MP) to the House of Commons of the Parliament of the United Kingdom, elected by the first past the post voting system.

The incumbent Conservative Member of Parliament, Lord Alwyne Compton, resigned for private and business reasons.

== Previous result ==
General election December 1910: Electorate 20,701
Party	Candidate	Votes	%	±%
Conservative	Lord Alwyne Compton	9,197	60.0	−1.0
Liberal	William George Lobjoit	6,124	40.0	+1.0
Majority		3,073	20.0	−2.0
Turnout		15,321	74.0	−10.5
Conservative hold		Swing	-1.0	

== Result ==
The seat was held unopposed for the Conservative Party by William Joynson-Hicks.

By-Election 23 March 1911
Party	Candidate	Votes	%	±%
Conservative	William Joynson-Hicks	Unopposed		
Conservative hold				
