= Biggleswade (constituency) =

Parliamentary constituency in the United Kingdom, 1885–1918

- Former county constituency for the House of Commons
- County: Bedfordshire
- Major settlements: Biggleswade

1885–1918
- Seats: One
- Created from: Bedfordshire
- Replaced by: Bedford (Majority) and Mid Bedfordshire (Part)

Biggleswade was a county constituency in Bedfordshire which was represented in the House of Commons of the Parliament of the United Kingdom from 1885 until its abolition in 1918. It elected one Member of Parliament (MP) by the first-past-the-post voting system.

== Boundaries ==
The constituency was created as the Northern or Biggleswade Division of Bedfordshire under the Redistribution of Seats Act 1885, when the two-member Parliamentary County of Bedfordshire was divided into the two single-member constituencies of Biggleswade and Luton. It comprised the sessional divisions of Bedford, Biggleswade and Sharnbrook, part of the sessional division of Ampthill and the municipal borough of Bedford. Only non-resident freeholders of the municipal borough (which comprised the Parliamentary Borough of Bedford) were entitled to vote.

The constituency was abolished in 1918. The northern part of the Division surrounding the Borough of Bedford, including Kempston, was included in the Bedford Division. The southern part, including Ampthill and Biggleswade, was included in the new Mid Bedfordshire Division.

== Members of Parliament ==
Election	Member	Party	Notes
1885	Charles Magniac	Liberal	Member for Bedford (1880–1885)
1886	Viscount Baring	Liberal Unionist	Member for Winchester (1880–1885)
1892	George Russell	Liberal	Member for Aylesbury (1880–1885)
1895	Lord Alwyne Compton	Liberal Unionist	
1906	Arthur Black	Liberal	Contested Mid Bedfordshire following redistribution
1918	Constituency abolished: see Bedford		

== Elections ==
=== Elections in the 1880s ===
General election 1885: Biggleswade
Party	Candidate	Votes	%
Liberal	Charles Magniac	6,037	57.7
Conservative	Walter Barttelot	4,422	42.3
Majority		1,615	15.4
Turnout		10,459	78.5
Registered electors		13,322	
Liberal win (new seat)			

General election 1886: Biggleswade
Party	Candidate	Votes	%	±%
Liberal Unionist	Francis Baring	4,853	52.6	+10.3
Liberal	Charles Magniac	4,371	47.4	−10.3
Majority		482	5.2	N/A
Turnout		9,224	69.2	−9.3
Registered electors		13,322		
Liberal Unionist gain from Liberal		Swing	+10.3	

=== Elections in the 1890s ===
General election 1892: Biggleswade
Party	Candidate	Votes	%	±%
Liberal	George Russell	5,600	52.6	+5.2
Liberal Unionist	Francis Baring	5,056	47.4	−5.2
Majority		544	5.2	N/A
Turnout		10,656	77.9	+8.7
Registered electors		13,686		
Liberal gain from Liberal Unionist		Swing	+5.2	

General election 1895: Biggleswade
Party	Candidate	Votes	%	±%
Liberal Unionist	Alwyne Compton	5,643	51.2	+3.8
Liberal	George Russell	5,376	48.8	−3.8
Majority		267	2.4	N/A
Turnout		11,019	80.2	+2.3
Registered electors		13,744		
Liberal Unionist gain from Liberal		Swing	+3.8	

=== Elections in the 1900s ===
General election 1900: Biggleswade
Party	Candidate	Votes	%	±%
Liberal Unionist	Alwyne Compton	Unopposed		
Liberal Unionist hold				

General election 1906: Biggleswade
Party	Candidate	Votes	%	±%
Liberal	Arthur Black	6,902	61.6	New
Liberal Unionist	Alwyne Compton	4,298	38.4	N/A
Majority		2,604	23.2	N/A
Turnout		11,200	79.5	N/A
Registered electors		14,085		
Liberal gain from Liberal Unionist		Swing	N/A	

=== Elections in the 1910s ===
General election January 1910: Biggleswade
Party	Candidate	Votes	%	±%
Liberal	Arthur Black	6,631	52.4	−9.2
Liberal Unionist	Rowland Prothero	6,020	47.6	+9.2
Majority		611	4.8	−18.4
Turnout		12,651	90.2	+10.7
Liberal hold		Swing	−9.2	

Black

General election December 1910: Biggleswade
Party	Candidate	Votes	%	±%
Liberal	Arthur Black	6,536	52.9	+0.5
Conservative	Geoffrey Carr Glyn	5,808	47.1	−0.5
Majority		728	5.8	+1.0
Turnout		12,344	88.0	−2.2
Liberal hold		Swing	+0.5	

General Election 1914–15:

Another General Election was required to take place before the end of 1915. The political parties had been making preparations for an election to take place and by July 1914, the following candidates had been selected;

- Liberal: Arthur Black
- Unionist: Geoffrey Carr Glyn

== See also ==
- List of former United Kingdom Parliament constituencies
- Parliamentary franchise in the United Kingdom 1885–1918
