= John Edmund Mills =

John Edmund Mills MP
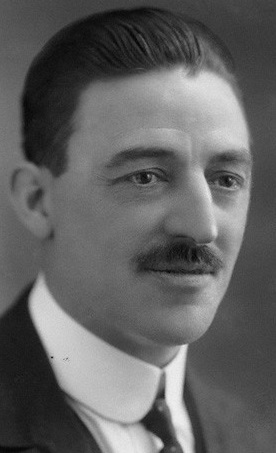
- Mills in 1920

Member of Parliament for Dartford
- In office 30 May 1929 – 7 October 1931
- Preceded by: Angus McDonnell
- Succeeded by: Frank Clarke
- In office 6 December 1923 – 9 October 1924
- Preceded by: George Jarrett
- Succeeded by: Angus McDonnell
- In office 27 March 1920 – 16 November 1922
- Preceded by: James Rowlands
- Succeeded by: George Jarrett

Personal details
- Born: 2 September 1882 Perth, Australia
- Died: 11 November 1951 (aged 69)
- Party: Labour

John Edmund Mills (2 September 1882 – 11 November 1951) was Labour MP for Dartford for three separate periods during the 1920s.

== Biography ==
Born in Perth in Australia, Mills grew up in Plymouth, being educated at the city's Higher Grade School. He became an engineer based at the Royal Arsenal in Woolwich, and was elected as chair of the works' Shop Stewards' Committee.

Mills was a supporter of the Labour Party, and was elected as a Member of Parliament at the 1920 Dartford by-election. Although he lost the seat at the 1922 United Kingdom general election, he won it back in 1923, serving as Parliamentary Private Secretary to Josiah Wedgwood. He lost again in 1924, won in 1929, and was finally defeated in 1931.

Mills also served on Woolwich Borough Council, and was President of the National Housing Association in 1921.
