= Lord Alwyne Compton (politician) =

British Army officer and politician

Lord Alwyne Compton DSO, DL
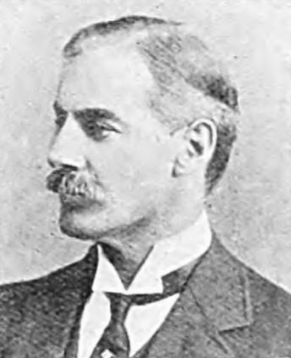

Member of Parliament for Brentford
- In office 1910–1911
- Preceded by: Vickerman Henzell Rutherford
- Succeeded by: William Joynson-Hicks

Member of Parliament for Biggleswade
- In office 1895–1906
- Preceded by: George W. E. Russell
- Succeeded by: Arthur Black

Personal details
- Born: 5 June 1855
- Died: 16 December 1911 (aged 56)
- Spouse: Mary Violet
- Parent(s): William Compton, 4th Marquess of Northampton; Eliza Elliot

Lord Alwyne Frederick Compton, DSO, DL (5 June 1855 – 16 December 1911) was a British Army officer who became a Liberal Unionist and then Unionist politician.

== Family ==
Compton was the third but second eldest surviving son of Admiral William Compton, 4th Marquess of Northampton, and his wife Eliza, daughter of Admiral Sir George Elliot. William Compton, 5th Marquess of Northampton, was his elder brother.

In 1886, he married Mary Evelyn Violet, daughter of Robert Charles de Grey Vyner (she was thereafter known as Lady Alwyne Compton).

== Military career ==
He was educated at Eton and entered the 31st Foot as a sub-lieutenant on 18 March 1874. He exchanged to the Grenadier Guards on 12 May 1875. Promoted to supernumerary lieutenant, Compton again exchanged into the 10th Hussars on 20 August 1879. In May 1882, he became aide-de-camp to George Robinson, 1st Marquess of Ripon, Viceroy of India, until the latter left office in February 1884, and was appointed full lieutenant on 28 November 1883.

Compton subsequently took part in the British campaign in the Sudan in 1884, and fought at El Teb and Tamai. He was appointed adjutant in March 1885, and resigned his adjutantcy on 20 October 1886. He reigned from the army and was appointed to the Reserve of Officers.

Following the outbreak of the Second Boer War in late 1899, Compton volunteered for service and was seconded to the Imperial Yeomanry, where he was appointed a captain on 17 February 1900. He was attached to the 28th (Bedfordshire) company of the 4th Battalion, Imperial Yeomanry. The company left Albert Docks in the SS Kent in early February 1900, Lord Alwyn in command as senior officer on the ship, and arrived at South Africa the following month. For his service, he was awarded the Distinguished Service Order (DSO) in November 1900, and promoted to major in September 1901.

== Political career ==
He was elected to the House of Commons at the 1895 general election as the Liberal Unionist Member of Parliament (MP) for the Biggleswade division of Bedfordshire. Compton was re-elected unopposed in 1900, but at the 1906 general election he was defeated by the Liberal Party candidate Arthur Black. He was returned to the Commons at the January 1910 election as Unionist MP for Brentford, and held the seat until his resignation on 15 March 1911 by the procedural device of appointment as Steward of the Chiltern Hundreds.

He died in December 1911, aged 56. Lady Alwyne Compton died in October 1957.

Parliament of the United Kingdom
Preceded by George W. E. Russell	Member of Parliament for Biggleswade; 1895–1906	Succeeded by Arthur Black
Preceded by Vickerman Rutherford	Member of Parliament for Brentford; January 1910–1911	Succeeded by William Joynson-Hicks
