= 1920 Dartford by-election =

UK Parliamentary by-election

- 27 March 1920 (Polling); 10 April 1920 (Declaration)
- Registered: 44,281
- Turnout: 61.3%
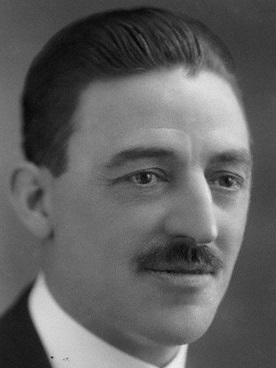

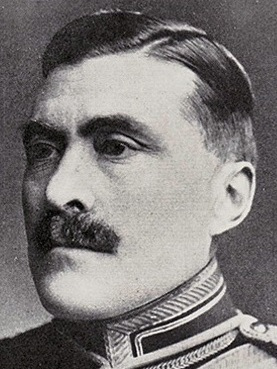
			Uni
Candidate	John Mills	Thomas Wing	Richard Meller
Party	Labour	Liberal	Unionist
Alliance			Coalition
Popular vote	13,610	4,562	4,221
Percentage	50.1%	16.8%	15.6%
Swing	▲21.4%	New	New
		Ind
Candidate	Reginald Applin	Frank Emil Fehr
Party	National	Ind. Unionist
Popular vote	2,952	1,802
Percentage	10.9%	6.6%
Swing	New	New
MP before election
James Rowlands
National Liberal
Subsequent MP
John Mills
Labour

The 1920 Dartford by-election was held on 27 March 1920. The by-election was held due to the death of the incumbent Coalition Liberal MP, James Rowlands. It was won by the Labour candidate John Edmund Mills.

== Background ==
The incumbent member James Rowlands had been first elected in 1906 as a Lib–Lab candidate, before becoming a Coalition Liberal on the 1916 formation of the Coalition Government. He had substantially increased his majority in 1918 defeating Labour Candidate William Ling by 42.8%. He died on 1 March 1920 and the writs for the by election were issues on 12 March.

== Candidates ==
=== Coalition Liberal ===
The Coalition Liberals opted not the defend the seat, instead backing the Unionist candidate.

=== Labour ===
- John Mills, engineer and member of Woolwich Borough Council

=== Liberal ===
- Thomas Wing, member for Houghton-le-Spring (1913–1918) and Great Grimsby (1910)

=== Conservative ===
- Richard Meller, barrister and member of Surrey County Council

=== National ===
- Reginald Applin, Lieutenant colonel in the British Army

=== Other ===
- Frank Emil Fehr, businessman and underwriter

== Result ==
Dartford by-election, 1920
Party		Candidate	Votes	%	±%
	Labour	John Edmund Mills	13,610	50.1	+21.4
	Liberal	Thomas Wing	4,562	16.8	N/A
C	Unionist	Richard Meller	4,221	15.6	New
	National	Reginald Applin	2,952	10.9	New
	Ind. Unionist	Frank Emil Fehr	1,802	6.6	New
Majority			9,048	33.3	N/A
Turnout			27,147	61.3	+13.4
Registered electors			44,281		
	Labour gain from National Liberal		Swing	N/A	
C indicates candidate endorsed by the coalition government.

== Aftermath ==
Mills would lose the seat to back to the National Liberals in 1922.
