= Evan Cotton =

British politician, barrister, administrator, journalist, historian and writer

Harry Evan Auguste Cotton
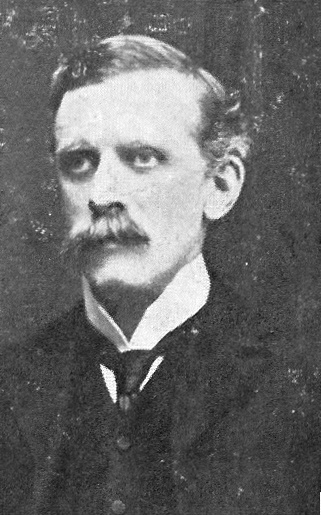
- Born: 27 May 1868; Midnapore, Bengal Presidency, British Raj
- Died: 7 March 1939 (aged 70); Eastbourne, England
- Occupations: Historian, author
- Spouse: Nora Grimley

Harry Evan Auguste Cotton CIE (27 May 1868 – 7 March 1939), better known as Sir Evan Cotton or H. E. A. Cotton, was a Liberal politician, barrister, administrator, journalist, historian and writer.

== Formative years ==
Cotton was born in Midnapore, the son of Sir Henry Cotton, who presided over the 1904 session of the Indian National Congress, and the Irish-born Mary Ryan. The family had worked in India from the 1760s. He received his early schooling at Mount Liban School, Pau and then at Sherborne School.

He held an open scholarship at Jesus College, Oxford, where he obtained a second class in Classics Honour Mods, followed by second class degrees in history and jurisprudence. He was called to the bar by Lincoln's Inn.

== Life and work ==
Cotton practised at Calcutta High Court from 1893 to 1908. He served as a member of Calcutta Municipal Corporation. He covered the Delhi Durbar of 1903 as a correspondent of the Manchester Guardian. He subsequently served as the Kolkata correspondent of the Daily News. He undertook the editorship of India, the weekly organ of the British Committee of the Indian National Congress. He served as President of the Bengal Legislative Council from 1922 to 1925. He was an active member of the Indian Historical Records Commission and was chairman from 1923 to 1925.

In all his activities, his primary concern was for India, a country served by four generations in the family. He provided strong support to the Montagu–Chelmsford Reforms and served on an advisory committee at the India Office in connection with the 1919 Act. He was pivot of a small group that supported reforms. However, the changing political environment dampened his spirits. He later became a severe critic of the constitutional changes that led to the Round Table Conference.

In 1896, he married Nora, daughter of William H. Grimley of Bengal ICS. They had a daughter.

In the 1920s his savings were depleted by the economic depression and he wrote to Allahabad lawyer Tej Bahadur Sapru that he had "given up my house and with my wife and daughter am living in a cheap Bayswater boarding house. My books are all stored, I have resigned my club, and beyond tobacco deny myself every luxury. Even so I am obliged to borrow to pay my income tax. . . . I am in the best of health and feel that I am being wasted. All my interest lies in India and I am anxious to put at her disposal the fruits of my fourteen years here of public life. . . . Men are being brought out to India who are wholly ignorant of the country and its people and its problems. . . . I want so much to be of use to her just now: but no one seems to think of me." In 1922 Victor Bulwer-Lytton, 2nd Earl of Lytton, invited Cotton to work as a President of the Legislative Council in Bengal. The Bengal Swaraj movement under Chitta Ranjan Das however walked out of meetings and the nationalist press called him "the unworthy son of Sir Henry Cotton". The Swaraj Party forced him out in 1925 in favour of a Bengali and Cotton returned to England embittered. He was subsequently an opponent of all constitutional advance for India until his death.

=== Politics ===
Evan returned to England in 1906 and joined the Liberal Party. His father was himself a Liberal MP who sat for Nottingham East from 1906 to 1910. In January 1910, Evan contested the General Election at the Conservative seat of Dulwich;

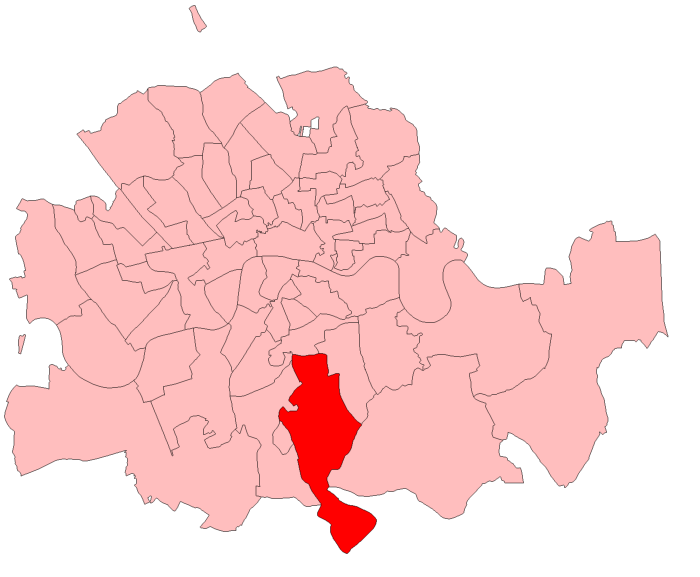
Dulwich in the London area, showing boundaries used in 1910

General Election January 1910: Dulwich Electorate 16,478
Party	Candidate	Votes	%	±%
Conservative	Bonar Law	8,472	58.3	+3.0
Liberal	Harry Evan Auguste Cotton	6,054	41.7	−3.0
Majority		2,418	16.6	+6.0
Turnout			88.2	
Conservative hold		Swing	+3.0	

In March 1910 he was elected as a Progressive Councillor to the London County Council representing Finsbury East;

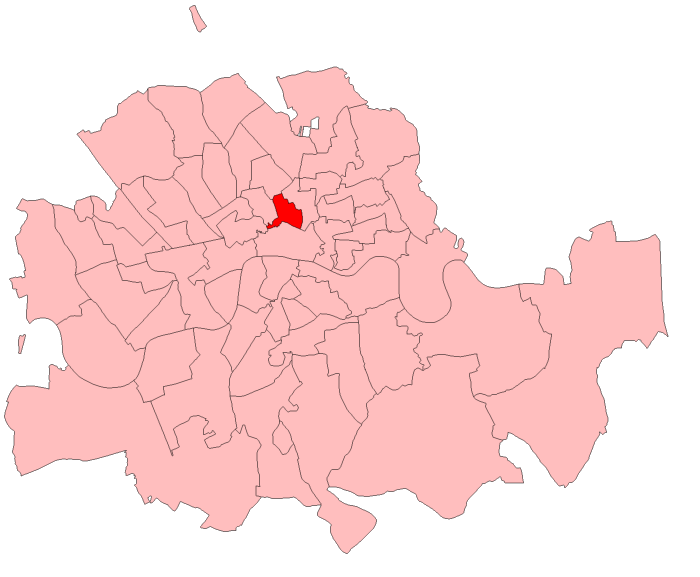
Finsbury East in the London area, showing boundaries used 1885–1918

London County Council election, 1910: Finsbury East Electorate
Party	Candidate	Votes	%	±%
Progressive	✓ Henry Evan Auguste Cotton	2,026	27.9	
Progressive	✓ George Masterman Gillett	2,020	27.8	
Municipal Reform	Lord Hardwicke	1,616	22.3	
Municipal Reform	Rev. J Lewthwaite	1,592	21.9	
Majority				
Progressive gain from Municipal Reform		Swing		

The Progressives were the local government arm of the Liberal Party. In March 1913 he was re-elected to the LCC;

London County Council election, 1913: Finsbury East Electorate 6,498
Party	Candidate	Votes	%	±%
Progressive	✓ George Masterman Gillett	2,037	26.2	−1.6
Progressive	✓ Henry Evan Auguste Cotton	2,026	26.1	−1.8
Municipal Reform	Eustace Widdrington Morrison-Bell	1,866	24.0	+1.7
Municipal Reform	William George Perring	1,837	23.7	+1.8
Majority				
Progressive hold		Swing		
Progressive hold		Swing		

In July 1918, when a vacancy occurred due to the death of a Liberal MP, for the parliamentary seat of Finsbury East. Cotton was an obvious candidate to defend the seat for the Liberal Party. Due to the wartime electoral truce, he did not face an official Unionist Party opponent and was comfortably elected;

1918 Finsbury East by-election: 16 July 1918
Party	Candidate	Votes	%	±%
Liberal	Harry Evan Auguste Cotton	1,156	59.9	+8.3
Independent	Capt. H.S. Spencer	576	29.8	n/a
Independent	A.S. Belsher	199	10.3	n/a
Majority		580	30.1	
Turnout			38.7	
Liberal hold		Swing	N/A	

Following boundary changes, Evan's Finsbury East seat was merged with the Unionist seat of Finsbury Central to form a new Finsbury constituency. The Coalition Government chose to publicly endorse the Unionist candidate who was the sitting MP for the old Central seat. This endorsement made Evan's prospects difficult and after only 5 months as an MP he was defeated;

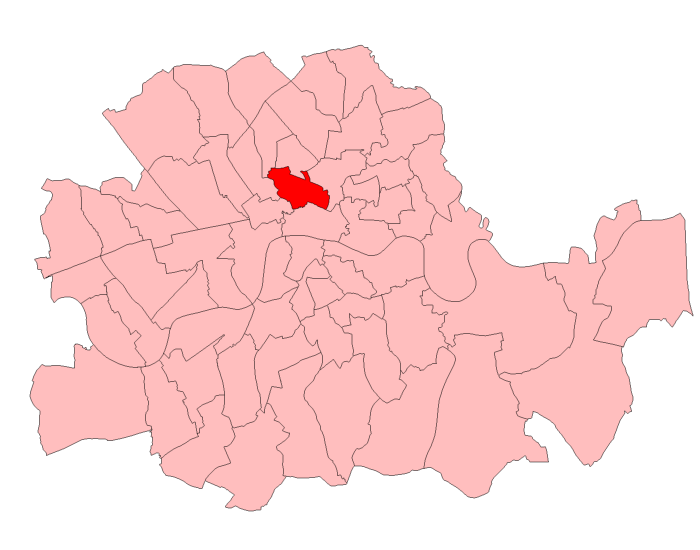
Finsbury in the County of London, showing boundaries used in 1918

General Election 1918: Finsbury Electorate 34,873
Party	Candidate	Votes	%	±%
Coalition Conservative	Martin Archer-Shee	8,782	63.8	n/a
Liberal	Harry Evan Auguste Cotton	4,981	36.2	n/a
Majority		3,801	27.6	n/a
Turnout		13,763	39.5	n/a
Coalition Conservative win				

In 1919 he did not defend his Finsbury East seat on the London County Council as after the election he was appointed as an Alderman.

== Works ==
Calcutta: Old and New, The Century in India 1800–1900, Hartly House, Calcutta, Murray's Handbook of India, Burma and Ceylon (13th and 14th editions)

== See also ==
- List of United Kingdom MPs with the shortest service

== Sources ==
- Who's Who of British members of parliament, Volume II 1886–1918, edited by M. Stenton and S. Lees (Harvester Press: 1978)

Parliament of the United Kingdom
Preceded by Joseph Allen Baker	Member of Parliament for East Finsbury; 1918 Finsbury East by-election – 1918 General Election	constituency abolished
