= Henry Charles Richards =

British politician (1851–1905)

Richards in 1895.

Henry Charles Richards (10 April 1851 – 1 June 1905) was a British barrister and Conservative Party politician.

The son of Frederick Richards, JP, of Ore and St Leonards-on-Sea, Sussex. He was educated at the City of London School and the Proprietary School, Gravesend. He entered employment as a clerk for the firm of Munt Brown and Co., hat and bonnet makers, in the City of London. After fifteen years he was awarded the Bacon Scholarship to study law at Gray's Inn in 1879. He was called to the bar in 1881. He worked as counsel for the Postmaster-General and for the London County Council. In 1898 he "took silk" to become a Queen's Counsel. From 1882 to 1885 he was one of the City's representatives on the London School Board. He was elected a bencher of Gray's Inn and was treasurer in the year before his death.

Active in Conservative politics, he unsuccessfully attempted to win a seat for the party at Northampton in 1885, 1886, 1892. At the 1895 general election he contested the London constituency of Finsbury East. He won the seat, defeating the sitting Liberal Member of Parliament, James Rowlands. He was seen as representing his largely working class constituents effectively, and was re-elected in 1900 with an increased majority.

Richards was also a very active "high church" member of the Church of England. He was appointed chairman of the City Branch of the Church Defence Institution in 1877 and three years later formed the City Church and Churchyard Preservation Society.

He inherited his father's home, "Caerhages", in West Hill, St Leonards-on-Sea. In 1901 he paid for the erection of a stone cross in Hastings to mark the coronation of King Edward VII and Queen Alexandra.

Richards died in a London nursing home of heart disease in June 1905, aged 54.

Parliament of the United Kingdom
Preceded by James Rowlands	Member of Parliament for Finsbury East; 1895–1905	Succeeded by Joseph Allen Baker
