= Hannah Steiner =

- Born: 27 April 1894; Česká Lípa, Austria-Hungary
- Died: 1944 (aged 49–50); Auschwitz concentration camp
- Occupation: Social worker
- Known for: Czech kindertransport

Hannah Steiner (27 April 1894 – 1944) was a Czech Zionist activist, humanitarian, and co-founder and first president of the Czech branch of the Women's International Zionist Organization (WIZO).

== Early life and education ==
Hannah Steiner (née Dub) was born on 27 April 1894 in Česká Lípa. She spent three years of her teens studying London. There, she joined the Zionist movement, before returning to the Czech lands via Palestine.

After her marriage in 1920 to Ludwig Steiner, a secondary school teacher, Steiner settled in Prague. She subsequently led the transformation of the Zionist Women’s and Girls' Club to co-found Czechoslovakia's branch of the Women's International Zionist Organization (WIZO) in 1925, and became its first president. Her work with the Czech branch of WIZO earned her membership to the World WIZO organization. At that time, her role chiefly revolved around education and vocational training. From 1927 she also edited, with Miriam Scheuer, the periodical that she established, titled Blätter der Jüdischen Frau, a woman's supplement of the Jewish weekly Selbstwehr.

== Later life ==
Following Hitler's rise to power, Steiner's role increasingly focussed on German refugees. With Marie Schmolka, she led programmes in refugee relief. In December 1938, along with Schmolka and Martin Blake, she asked Nicholas Winton to hold off his skiing holiday in the Alps and visit Prague instead. The Czech police helped the Gestapo arrest both Steiner and Schmolka in March 1939, and they were sent to Pankrác Prison, where they were tortured. Having spent several months there, they were released following action by Františka Plamínková.

Following the onset of the Second World War, when Schmolka was in Paris before moving to London, Steiner took over her roles at Prague. As a result, Steiner was held answerable for Schmolka's escape from Nazi occupied Europe.

== Arrest and death ==
Steiner was again arrested and sent to Theresienstadt Ghetto, along with her husband. They were subsequently moved to Auschwitz where, in 1944, they were killed in the gas chambers.
