= Allen Baker =

Canadian-born British engineer

Joseph Allen Baker, circa 1898

Joseph Allen Baker (10 April 1852 – 3 July 1918) was a British North America-born British engineer, specialising in machinery for the confectionery and bakery industries and later in transportation systems, who was also a Liberal Party politician in London.

== Family and education ==
Joseph Allen Baker was born at Maple Ridge Farm in Trenton, Ontario the son of Joseph Baker, an engineer. The Baker family were Quakers by religion. Baker was educated at Trenton High School. In 1878 he married Elizabeth Moscrip of Morebattle, Kelso, Roxburghshire. They had three sons and four daughters, including the politician Philip Noel-Baker.

== Career ==
Baker followed his father's professional footsteps and entered the family engineering business. He left Canada for London in 1878 and established a firm, Baker & Sons, with his brothers, of which he became chairman in 1892 on the death of his father. In 1879 they set up business in Finsbury but the trade expanded and, in 1890 a move was made to a large, newly built engineering works in Hythe Road, Willesden, where it remained for the next 43 years. As Quakers, the Baker family tried to run a model business taking a paternal interest in the welfare of their workforce and introducing schemes such as shorter working days, encouraging employees to participate in health and insurance plans and fostering a relaxed approach on the shop floor, perhaps to the detriment of profits. The company had interests in Britain, Canada, Australia and the USA.

Baker was prominently connected with the tramways in London and the extension of the tramway system in the London County Council area. He published special reports on tramway traction and recommended the conduit system for London. Baker and Sons also had connections to the motor car industry and in around 1902, the company held an agency for the American car manufacturers Stevens-Duryea. They later designed and built their own lorry for deliveries to the London docks. Baker & Sons merged with Perkins Engineers Ltd in 1919 to form Baker Perkins Ltd.

== Politics ==
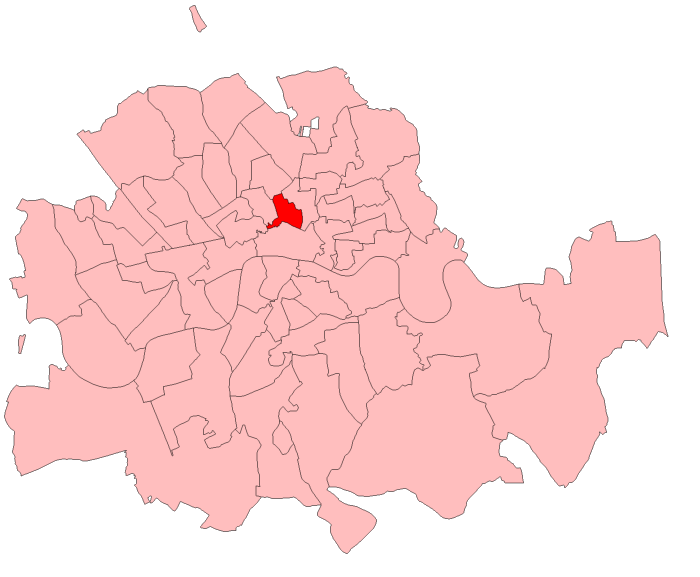
Finsbury East in the Metropolitan area, showing boundaries used from 1885 to 1918.

Baker represented Finsbury East on the London County Council (LCC) as a Progressive from 1895 to 1906. During his time on the LCC he acted as Chairman of the Highways Committee.

At the general election of 1900 Baker contested the East Finsbury constituency for the Liberal Party but could not unseat the sitting Unionist MP, Henry Charles Richards.

General election 1900: Finsbury, East
Party	Candidate	Votes	%	±%
Conservative	Henry Charles Richards	2,174	54.3	
Liberal	Joseph Allen Baker	1,827	45.7	
Majority		347	8.6	
Turnout		5,678	70.5	
Conservative hold		Swing	+1.1	

Richards died in 1905 causing a by-election and Baker was selected to fight the division again. He won the by-election, which was held on 29 June 1905, with a majority of 768 votes

1905 Finsbury East by-election: 29 June 1905
Party	Candidate	Votes	%	±%
Liberal	Joseph Allen Baker	2,320	59.9	
Conservative	N.L. Cohen	1,552	40.1	
Majority		768	19.8	
Turnout		5,302	73.0	
Liberal gain from Conservative		Swing	+14.2	

He held his seat at each subsequent general election until his death.

General election 1906: Finsbury, East
Party	Candidate	Votes	%	±%
Liberal	Joseph Allen Baker	2,461	58.1	
Conservative	Alfred Welby	1,772	41.9	
Majority		689	16.2	
Turnout		5,326	79.5	
Liberal hold		Swing	-1.8	

General election January 1910: Finsbury, East
Party	Candidate	Votes	%	±%
Liberal	Joseph Allen Baker	2,102	51.0	
Conservative	William Mason	2,016	49.0	
Majority		86	2.0	
Turnout				
Liberal hold		Swing	-7.1	

General election December 1910: Finsbury, East
Party	Candidate	Votes	%	±%
Liberal	Joseph Allen Baker	2,023	51.6	
Conservative	William Mason	1,900	48.4	
Majority		123	3.2	
Turnout				
Liberal hold		Swing	+0.6	

== Peace and religious work ==
As a Quaker, Baker was committed to peace and religious harmony. He initiated and organised an interchange of visits between representatives of the Christian churches of Great Britain and Germany in the interests of international peace and closer friendship. He was Chairman of the Executive Committee of the British Council of the Associated Councils of Churches in the British and German Empires for Fostering Friendly Relations and Chairman of the Executive Committee of the British Group of the World Alliance of Churches for Promoting International Friendship. He was also sometime President of the London Adult Schools' Union and was a strong supporter of temperance.

== Death ==
Baker died in Westminster Hospital in the early hours of 3 July 1918, aged 66, following a seizure in the House of Commons two days before. He was succeeded as Chairman of Baker and Sons by his eldest son, Allan R. Baker. His death caused a by-election in East Finsbury which was won for the Liberal Party by H.E.A.Cotton, who, like Baker was a former Progressive member of the LCC although he stood for election as a Government candidate.

Parliament of the United Kingdom
Preceded by Henry Charles Richards	Member of Parliament for East Finsbury; 1905 – 1918	Succeeded by H. E. A. Cotton
