= International Mission to Jewish People =

British Protestant Christian missionary organization

- Formation: 1842
- Merger of: Barbican Mission to the Jews; International Society for Evangelisation of the Jews
- Website: www.imjp.org

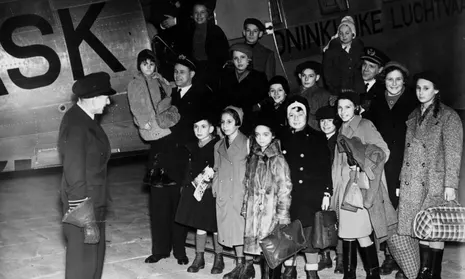
The first planeload of Jewish refugee children from Czechoslovakia arrived in England on 12 January 1939. The Barbicans arranged the flight.

International Mission to Jewish People (IMJP) formerly Christian Witness to Israel (CWI). The organisation, which was founded in 1842, was consolidated in 1976 by the amalgamation of two agencies: The International Society for Evangelisation of the Jews and The Barbican Mission to the Jews.

The International Society for the Evangelisation of the Jews (IJS) was founded on 7 November 1842 as the British Society for the Propagation of the Gospel Among the Jews in the National Scotch Church, Regent Square, London. It published a periodical called The Jewish Herald.

The Barbican Mission to the Jews (BMJ) was founded in 1879 and led by Rev P.I.J Warschawski and then Mr C.T Lipschytz. It operated in the Barbican area of the East End of London, and was run by Jewish Christians. BMJ was also involved in the Kindertransport, including the KLM flight of January 1939, and supported the rescue of about a hundred Jewish children to England prior to World War II.

Both pre- and post-millennial theology inspired the early Christian Zionists who established and ran the two progenitor societies. However, other Puritan and missiological influences were at play.

IMJP has workers in Israel, the United Kingdom, France, Holland, Hungary, Bulgaria, Australia, New Zealand, Hong Kong and the United States. It considers that the Bible "gives a special place to Jewish evangelism".

== See also ==
- British Committee for Refugees from Czechoslovakia
- Conversion of the Jews
- Proselytization and counter-proselytization of Jews
