= Finsbury East (UK Parliament constituency) =

Parliamentary constituency in the United Kingdom, 1885–1918

- Former borough constituency for the House of Commons

1885–1918
- Seats: one
- Created from: Finsbury
- Replaced by: Finsbury

Finsbury East was a parliamentary constituency centred on the Finsbury district of North London, England. It returned one Member of Parliament (MP) to the House of Commons of the Parliament of the United Kingdom, elected by the first past the post system.

== History ==
The constituency was created when the two-member Finsbury constituency was divided by the Redistribution of Seats Act 1885 for the 1885 general election. It was abolished for the 1918 general election, when it was replaced by a new single-member Finsbury constituency.

The area was a predominantly working-class district. Business and industry gradually expanded into Finsbury from the city to the south, during the period when this constituency existed. Pelling points out that, of an electorate of 6,140 in 1888, there were 384 non-resident voters.

During the early part of the period James Rowlands, a working man and secularist, was the Liberal Party's standard bearer in the seat. He contested the seat as a Liberal-Labour candidate (i.e. an official Liberal candidate with a trade union background). He lost to Conservative businessman James Bigwood in 1885 by 20 votes (when the Liberals secured a national majority of seats). However, Rowlands won in 1886 with a majority of 61 (when most nominees of the split Liberal Party fared disastrously at the polls). This was the only seat the Gladstonian Liberals gained in the London metropolitan area in 1886. Pelling suggests that a section of the local Liberals may have abstained in the first election, owing to the candidate's views and background, but were motivated to vote in 1886 by the importance of the Home Rule issue. Rowlands was re-elected in 1892 by a majority of 290, but was defeated in 1895 when there was a Conservative majority of 270.

The new Conservative MP was a barrister. Henry Richards QC is described in the Who's Who of British Members of Parliament as "A Democratic Tory" in favour of "social reforms, the union of Church and State, denominational schools, old age pensions, redistribution of seats and better housing of the working classes". He was re-elected with a majority of 347 in 1900 and sat in Parliament until his death on 1 June 1905.

From the 1905 by-election until it was abolished in the redistribution of 1918, the East division was a pretty safe Liberal seat. Allen Baker, a Quaker by religion and an engineer by profession, was the Liberal candidate who lost in 1900 but secured a majority of 768 in the 1905 by-election. Baker was a representative of East Finsbury on the London County Council from 1895 to 1907. Baker's Who's Who of British Members of Parliament article suggests he was "largely interested in Temperance and Religious Work", although he is also described as an "advanced Liberal". Baker retained the parliamentary seat until his death on 3 July 1918.

The 1918 by-election returned another Liberal to sit as an MP for a few months. Evan Cotton was a lawyer and journalist with strong ties to the British community in India. Cotton had been born in Midnapore in Bengal. His father was Sir Henry Cotton KCSI. Evan Cotton married his wife Nora in 1896 and she was the daughter of William Grimley of the Bengal Civil Service. Cotton began his political career as a member of the Calcutta Corporation from 1900 to 1906. On moving to England he had become one of East Finsbury's member of London County Council, on which he served from 1910 to 1919 as a Councillor before becoming a County Alderman from 1919 to 1922. Cotton returned to India to become President of the Bengal Legislature from 1922 to 1925.

== Boundaries ==
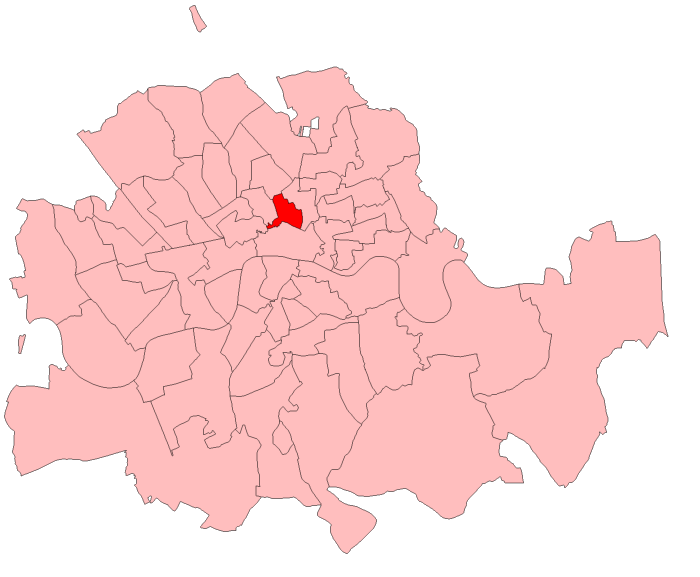
Finsbury East in London 1885–1918

The constituency was created, in 1885, as a division of the parliamentary borough of Finsbury, in the historic county of Middlesex to the north of the City of London. The seat was located in the eastern part of the parliamentary borough. The Redistribution of Seats Act 1885 provided that it was to consist of the Parishes of St Luke Middlesex, St Sepulchre, Middlesex, Charter House, and Glasshouse Yard.

The constituency was surrounded by the seats of Holborn to the south west; Finsbury Central to the north west; Islington South to the north; Hoxton to the west and the City of London to the south.

In 1889 Finsbury was severed from Middlesex, for administrative purposes, to become part of the County of London. In 1900 the lower tier of local government in London was rationalised. The old local boards and parish vestries were replaced, in the Finsbury area, by the Metropolitan Borough of Finsbury.

The local government changes did not affect the parliamentary boundaries until the redistribution of 1918, when the East division ceased to be a separate constituency.

== Members of Parliament ==
| Election | Member | Party |
|---|---|---|
| 1885 | James Bigwood | Conservative |
| 1886 | James Rowlands | Liberal |
| 1895 | Henry Charles Richards | Conservative |
| 1905 | Allen Baker | Liberal |
| 1918 | Evan Cotton | Liberal |
| 1918 | constituency abolished: see Finsbury | |

== Election results ==
=== Elections in the 1880s ===
James Bigwood

General election 1885: Finsbury East
| Party | Candidate | Votes | % | ±% |
|---|---|---|---|---|
| Conservative | James Bigwood | 2,055 | 50.2 | |
| Lib-Lab | James Rowlands | 2,035 | 49.8 | |
| Majority | | 20 | 0.4 | |
| Turnout | | 4,090 | 67.0 | |
| Registered electors | | 6,105 | | |
| Conservative win (new seat) | | | | |

Jimmy Rowlands

General election 1886: Finsbury East
| Party | Candidate | Votes | % | ±% |
|---|---|---|---|---|
| Lib-Lab | James Rowlands | 1,973 | 50.8 | +1.0 |
| Conservative | James Bigwood | 1,912 | 49.2 | −1.0 |
| Majority | | 61 | 1.6 | N/A |
| Turnout | | 3,885 | 63.6 | −3.4 |
| Registered electors | | 6,105 | | |
| Lib-Lab gain from Conservative | | Swing | +1.0 | |

=== Elections in the 1890s ===
Lucas-Shadwell

General election 1892: Finsbury East
| Party | Candidate | Votes | % | ±% |
|---|---|---|---|---|
| Lib-Lab | James Rowlands | 2,383 | 53.2 | +2.4 |
| Conservative | William Lucas-Shadwell | 2,093 | 46.8 | −2.4 |
| Majority | | 290 | 6.4 | +4.8 |
| Turnout | | 4,476 | 73.6 | +10.0 |
| Registered electors | | 6,079 | | |
| Lib-Lab hold | | Swing | +2.4 | |

H.C. Richards

General election 1895: Finsbury East
| Party | Candidate | Votes | % | ±% |
|---|---|---|---|---|
| Conservative | Henry Richards | 2,260 | 53.2 | +6.4 |
| Lib-Lab | James Rowlands | 1,990 | 46.8 | −6.4 |
| Majority | | 270 | 6.4 | N/A |
| Turnout | | 4,250 | 72.8 | −0.8 |
| Registered electors | | 5,840 | | |
| Conservative gain from Lib-Lab | | Swing | +6.4 | |

=== Elections in the 1900s ===
General election 1900: Finsbury East
| Party | Candidate | Votes | % | ±% |
|---|---|---|---|---|
| Conservative | Henry Richards | 2,174 | 54.3 | +1.1 |
| Liberal | Joseph Allen Baker | 1,827 | 45.7 | −1.1 |
| Majority | | 347 | 8.6 | +2.2 |
| Turnout | | 4,001 | 70.5 | −2.3 |
| Registered electors | | 5,678 | | |
| Conservative hold | | Swing | +1.1 | |

Allen Baker

1905 Finsbury East by-election
| Party | Candidate | Votes | % | ±% |
|---|---|---|---|---|
| Liberal | Joseph Allen Baker | 2,320 | 59.9 | +14.2 |
| Conservative | Nathaniel Louis Cohen | 1,552 | 40.1 | −14.2 |
| Majority | | 768 | 19.8 | N/A |
| Turnout | | 3,872 | 73.0 | +2.5 |
| Registered electors | | 5,302 | | |
| Liberal gain from Conservative | | Swing | +14.2 | |

General election 1906: Finsbury East
| Party | Candidate | Votes | % | ±% |
|---|---|---|---|---|
| Liberal | Joseph Allen Baker | 2,461 | 58.1 | +12.4 |
| Conservative | Alfred Welby | 1,772 | 41.9 | −12.4 |
| Majority | | 689 | 16.2 | N/A |
| Turnout | | 4,233 | 79.5 | +9.0 |
| Registered electors | | 5,326 | | |
| Liberal gain from Conservative | | Swing | +12.4 | |

=== Elections in the 1910s ===
General election January 1910: Finsbury East
| Party | Candidate | Votes | % | ±% |
|---|---|---|---|---|
| Liberal | Joseph Allen Baker | 2,102 | 51.0 | −7.1 |
| Conservative | William Mason | 2,016 | 49.0 | +7.1 |
| Majority | | 86 | 2.0 | −14.2 |
| Turnout | | 4,118 | 84.8 | +5.3 |
| Liberal hold | | Swing | -7.1 | |

General election December 1910: Finsbury East
| Party | Candidate | Votes | % | ±% |
|---|---|---|---|---|
| Liberal | Joseph Allen Baker | 2,023 | 51.6 | +0.6 |
| Conservative | William Mason | 1,900 | 48.4 | −0.6 |
| Majority | | 123 | 3.2 | +1.2 |
| Turnout | | 3,923 | 80.8 | −4.0 |
| Liberal hold | | Swing | +0.6 | |

Evan Cotton

1918 Finsbury East by-election
| Party | Candidate | Votes | % | ±% |
|---|---|---|---|---|
| Liberal | Evan Cotton | 1,156 | 59.9 | +8.3 |
| Independent | Harold Sherwood Spencer | 576 | 29.8 | New |
| Independent | Allan Smith Belsher | 199 | 10.3 | New |
| Majority | | 580 | 30.1 | +26.9 |
| Turnout | | 1,931 | 38.7 | −42.1 |
| Liberal hold | | Swing | N/A | |

- Spencer was endorsed by Noel Billing's Vigilante Society

== London County Council ==
The parliamentary constituencies in London were also used to elect members to the County Council. The Progressive Party in London corresponded to the Liberal Party in national politics. The Moderates (from 1906 the Municipal Reform Party) were the local equivalent of the national Conservative Party.

It is notable that Lord Rosebery represented this seat on the LCC when he was Foreign Secretary 1892-1894 and Prime Minister 1894–1895.

East Finsbury County Councillors (2 seats)

Benson

| Year | Until | Member | Party |
|---|---|---|---|
| 1889 | 1898 | John Benn | Progressive |
| 1889 | 1892 | John Sinclair | Progressive |
| 1892 | 1895 | Archibald Primrose | Progressive |
| 1895 | 1907 | Allen Baker | Progressive |
| 1898 | 1904 | Joseph Benson | Progressive |
| 1904 | 1907 | Edmund Harvey | Progressive |
| 1907 | 1910 | E. Howes | Municipal Reform |
| 1907 | 1910 | Alfred Welby | Municipal Reform |
| 1910 | 1919 | Evan Cotton | Progressive |
| 1910 | 1919 | George Gillett | Labour |
| 1919 | constituency abolished | | |
