= Jewish Quarterly-Wingate Prize =

British literary prize

The Jewish Quarterly-Wingate Literary Prize is an annual British literary prize inaugurated in 1977. It is named after the host Jewish Quarterly and the prize's founder Harold Hyam Wingate. The award recognises Jewish and non-Jewish writers resident in the UK, British Commonwealth, Europe and Israel who "stimulate an interest in themes of Jewish concern while appealing to the general reader". As of 2011 the winner receives £4,000.

The Jewish Chronicle called it "British Jewry's top literary award", and Yedioth Ahronoth said it is a "prestigious literature prize".

== Recipients ==
Award winners and shortlists
Year	Category	Author(s)	Title	Publisher	Result	Ref.
1996	Fiction	Alan Isler	The Prince of West End Avenue	Jonathan Cape	Winner	
1996	Non-fiction	Theo Richmond	Konin: One Man's Quest for a Vanished Jewish Community	Jonathan Cape	Winner	
1997	Fiction	W. G. Sebald	The Emigrants	Harvill Press	Winner	
1997	Fiction	Clive Sinclair	The Lady with the Laptop	Picador	Winner	
1997	Nonfiction	Louise Kehoe	In this Dark House: A Memoir	Viking	Shortlist	
1997	Nonfiction	Silvia Rodgers	Red Saint, Pink Daughter	Andre Deutsch	Shortlist	
1997	Nonfiction	George Steiner	No Passion Spent: Essays 1978–1995	Faber	Shortlist	
1998	Fiction	Anne Michaels	Fugitive Pieces	Bloomsbury	Winner	
1998	Fiction	Esther Freud	Gaglow	Penguin	Shortlist	
1998	Fiction	David Grossman	The ZigZag Kid	Bloomsbury	Shortlist	
1998	Fiction	Mordecai Richler	Barney's Version	Chatto & Windus	Shortlist	
1998	Non-fiction	Claudia Roden	The Book of Jewish Food: An Odyssey from Samarkand to New York		Winner	
1998	Non-fiction	Jenny Diski	Skating to Antarctica	Granta	Shortlist	
1998	Non-fiction	Leila Berg	Flickerbook	Granta	Shortlist	
1998	Non-fiction	Sally Berkovic	Under My Hat	Josephs Bookstore	Shortlist	
1999	Fiction	Dorit Rabinyan	Persian Brides	Canongate	Winner	
1999	Fiction	Jay Rayner	Day of Atonement	Black Swan	Shortlist	
1999	Fiction	Savyon Liebrecht	Apples from the Desert	Laki Books	Shortlist	
1999	Fiction	Paolo Maurensig	Luneberg Variations	Phoenix House	Shortlist	
1999	Non-fiction	Edith Velmans	Edith's Book: The True Story of a Young Girl's Courage and Survival During World War II	Viking	Winner	
1999	Non-fiction	David Hare	Via Dolorosa	Faber & Faber	Shortlist	
1999	Non-fiction	Michael Ignatieff	Isaiah Berlin	Chatto & Windus	Shortlist	
1999	Non-fiction	Niall Ferguson	The World's Banker	Weidenfeld & Nicolson	Shortlist	
2000	Fiction	Howard Jacobson	The Mighty Walzer	Jonathan Cape	Winner	
2000	Fiction	Bernice Rubens	I, Dreyfus	Abacus	Shortlist	
2000	Fiction	Elena Lappin	Foreign Brides	Picador	Shortlist	
2000	Fiction	Nathan Englander	For the Relief of Unbearable Urges	Faber & Faber	Shortlist	
2000	Non-fiction	Władysław Szpilman	The Pianist	Viking	Winner	
2000	Non-fiction	Anthony Rudolf	The Arithmetic of Mind	Bellew Publishing	Shortlist	
2000	Non-fiction	David Vital	A People Apart: The Jews in Europe 1789-1939	Oxford University Press	Shortlist	
2000	Non-fiction	Lisa Appignanesi	Losing the Dead	Chatto & Windus	Shortlist	
2001	Fiction	Mona Yahia	When the Grey Beetles took over Baghdad	Peter Halban	Winner	
2001	Fiction	Elisabeth Russell Taylor	Will Dolores Come to Tea?	Arcadia	Shortlist	
2001	Fiction	Lawrence Norfolk	In the Shape of a Boar	Weidenfeld & Nicolson	Shortlist	
2001	Fiction	Linda Grant	When I Lived in Modern Times	Granta	Shortlist	
2001	Non-fiction	Mark Roseman	A Past In Hiding: Memory and Survival in Nazi Germany	Allen Lane	Winner	
2001	Non-fiction	Hugo Gryn and Naomi Gryn	Chasing Shadows	Viking	Shortlist	
2001	Non-fiction	Louise London	Whitehall and the Jews 1933-1948	Cambridge University Press	Shortlist	
2001	Non-fiction	Michael Billig	Rock 'n Roll Jews	Five Leaves	Shortlist	
2002	Fiction	W. G. Sebald	Austerlitz	Hamish Hamilton	Winner	
2002	Fiction	Agnès Desarthe	Five Photos of My Wife	Flamingo	Shortlist	
2002	Fiction	Emma Richler	Sister Crazy	Flamingo	Shortlist	
2002	Fiction	Zvi Jagendorf	Wolfy and the Strudelbakers	Dewi Lewis	Shortlist	
2002	Non-fiction	Oliver Sacks	Uncle Tungsten: Memories of a Chemical Boyhood	Picador	Winner	
2002	Non-fiction	John Gross	A Double Thread	Chatto & Windus	Shortlist	
2002	Non-fiction	Joseph Roth	The Wandering Jews	Granta	Shortlist	
2002	Non-fiction	Mihail Sebastian	Journal 1935-44	William Heinemann	Shortlist	
2003	Fiction	Zadie Smith	The Autograph Man	Penguin Books	Winner	
2003	Fiction	Arnošt Lustig	Lovely Green Eyes	Harvill	Shortlist	
2003	Fiction	Dannie Abse	The Strange Case of Dr Simmonds & Dr Glas	Robson	Shortlist	
2003	Fiction	Micheal O'Siadhail	The Gossamer Wall	Bloodaxe	Shortlist	
2003	Fiction	Norman Lebrecht	The Song of Names	Review	Shortlist	
2003	Non-fiction	Sebastian Haffner	Defying Hitler: A Memoir	Weidenfeld & Nicolson	Winner	
2003	Non-fiction	Carole Angier	The Double Bond	Viking Penguin	Shortlist	
2003	Non-fiction	Ian Thomson	Primo Levi	Hutchinson	Shortlist	
2003	Non-fiction	Roman Frister	Impossible Love	Weidenfeld & Nicolson	Shortlist	
2003	Non-fiction	Roma Ligocka	The Girl in the Red Coat	Sceptre	Shortlist	
2004	Fiction	David Grossman	Someone to Run With	Bloomsbury	Winner	
2004	Fiction	A. B. Yehoshua	The Liberated Bride	Peter Halban	Shortlist	
2004	Fiction	Dannie Abse	New & Collected Poems	Hutchinson	Shortlist	
2004	Non-fiction	Amos Elon	The Pity of It All: A Portrait of Jews in Germany 1743–1933	Penguin	Winner	
2004	Non-fiction	Igal Sarna	Broken Promises: Israeli Lives	Atlantic Books	Shortlist	
2004	Non-fiction	Mark Glanville	The Goldberg Variations: From Football Hooligan to Opera Singer	Flamingo	Shortlist	
2004	Non-fiction	Stanley Price	Somewhere to Hang My Hat	New Island	Shortlist	
2005	Fiction	David Bezmozgis	Natasha and Other Stories	Jonathan Cape	Winner	
2005	Fiction	Howard Jacobson	The Making of Henry	Jonathan Cape	Shortlist	
2005	Fiction	Moris Farhi	Young Turk	Saqi	Shortlist	
2005	Non-fiction	Amos Oz	A Tale of Love and Darkness	Chatto & Windus	Winner	
2005	Non-fiction	Béla Zsolt	Nine Suitcases	Jonathan Cape	Shortlist	
2005	Non-fiction	Joanna Olczak-Ronikier	In the Garden of Memory	Weidenfeld & Nicolson	Shortlist	
2005	Non-fiction	Simon Goldhill	The Temple of Jerusalem	Profile Books	Shortlist	
2006	N/A	Imre Kertész	Fatelessness	Harvill Press	Winner	
2006	N/A	Jean Molla	Sobibor	Aurora Metro	Shortlist	
2006	N/A	Michael Arditti	Unity	Maia Press	Shortlist	
2006	N/A	Neill Lochery	The View from the Fence, The Arab-Israeli Conflict from the Present to Its Roots	Continuum	Shortlist	
2006	N/A	Nicholas Stargardt	Witnesses of War: Children’s Lives under the Nazis	Jonathan Cape	Shortlist	
2006	N/A	Tamar Yellin	Genizah at the House of Shepher	Toby Press	Shortlist	
2006	N/A	Paul Kriwaczek	Yiddish Civilisation: The Rise and Fall of a Forgotten Nation	Weidenfeld & Nicolson	Shortlist	
2007	N/A	Howard Jacobson	Kalooki Nights	Cape	Winner	
2007	N/A	A. B. Yehoshua	A Woman in Jerusalem	Halban	Shortlist	
2007	N/A	Adam LeBor	City of Oranges	Bloomsbury	Shortlist	
2007	N/A	Andrew Miller	The Earl of Petticoat Lane	Heinemann	Shortlist	
2007	N/A	Carmen Callil	Bad Faith	Cape	Shortlist	
2007	N/A	Irène Némirovsky	Suite Française	Chatto	Shortlist	
2008	N/A	Etgar Keret	Missing Kissinger	Chatto and Windus	Winner	
2008	N/A	Tom Segev (trans. Jessica Cohen)	1967	Abacus	Shortlist	
2008	N/A	Philip Davis	Bernard Malamud	Oxford University Press	Shortlist	
2008	N/A	Phillippe Grimbert (trans. Polly McLean)	Secret	Portobello Books	Shortlist	
2009	N/A	Fred Wander	The Seventh Well	Granta	Winner	
2009	N/A	Amir Gutfreund (trans. Jessica Cohen)	The World a Moment Later	Toby Press	Shortlist	
2009	N/A	Denis MacShane	Globalising Hatred	Weidenfeld & Nicolson	Shortlist	
2009	N/A	Jackie Wullschlager	Chagall: Love and Exile	Allen Lane	Shortlist	
2009	N/A	Ladislaus Löb	Dealing with Satan	Jonathan Cape	Shortlist	
2009	N/A	Zoë Heller	The Believers	Fig Tree	Shortlist	
2010	N/A	Adina Hoffman	My Happiness Bears No Relation to Happiness: A Poet's Life in the Palestinian Century	Yale University Press	Winner	
2010	N/A	Julia Franck	The Blind Side of the Heart	Harvill Secker	Shortlist	
2010	N/A	Simon Mawer	The Glass Room	Little, Brown	Shortlist	
2010	N/A	Shlomo Sand	The Invention of the Jewish People	Verso	Shortlist	
2011	N/A	David Grossman	To the End of the Land	Jonathan Cape	Winner	
2011	N/A	Anthony Julius	Trials of the Diaspora	Oxford University Press	Shortlist	
2011	N/A	Edmund de Waal	The Hare with Amber Eyes	Chatto and Windus	Shortlist	
2011	N/A	Eli Amir	The Dove Flyer	Halban	Shortlist	
2011	N/A	Howard Jacobson	The Finkler Question	Bloomsbury	Shortlist	
2011	N/A	Jenny Erpenbeck (trans. Susan Bernofsky)	Visitation	Portobello Books	Shortlist	
2013 (Note: No award was presented in 2012.)	N/A	Shalom Auslander	Hope: A Tragedy	Picador	Winner	
2013	N/A	Amos Oz	Scenes from Village Life	Chatto and Windus	Shortlist	
2013	N/A	Bernard Wasserstein	On the Eve	Profile Books	Shortlist	
2013	N/A	Cynthia Ozick	Foreign Bodies	Atlantic Books	Shortlist	
2013	N/A	Deborah Levy	Swimming Home	And Other Stories	Shortlist	
2013	N/A	Stanley Price and Munro Price	The Road to the Apocalypse	Notting Hill Editions	Shortlist	
2014	N/A	Otto Dov Kulka	Landscapes of the Metropolis of Death	Allen Lane	Winner	
2014	N/A	Anouk Markovits	I Am Forbidden	Hogarth	Shortlist	
2014	N/A	Ben Marcus	The Flame Alphabet	Granta	Shortlist	
2014	N/A	Edith Pearlman	Binocular Vision	Pushkin Press	Shortlist	
2014	N/A	Shani Boianjiu	The People of Forever Are Not Afraid	Hogarth	Shortlist	
2014	N/A	Yudit Kiss	The Summer My Father Died	Telegram-Saqi	Shortlist	
2015	Fiction	Michel Laub (trans. Margaret Jull Costa)	Diary of the Fall	Harvill	Winner	
2015	Fiction	Dror Burstein (trans. Todd Hasak-Lowy)	Netanya	Dalkey Archive	Shortlist	
2015	Fiction	Zeruya Shalev (trans. Philip Simpson)	Remains of Love	Bloomsbury	Shortlist	
2015	Non-fiction	Thomas Harding	Hanns and Rudolf: The German Jew and the Hunt for the Kommandant of Auschwitz	Heinemann	Winner	
2015	Non-fiction	Antony Polonsky	Jews in Poland and Russia	Littman Library	Shortlist	
2015	Non-fiction	Gary Shteyngart	Little Failure: A Memoir	Penguin	Shortlist	
2015	Non-fiction	Hanna Krall (trans. Philip Boehm)	Chasing the King of Hearts	Peirene	Shortlist	
2016	N/A	Nikolaus Wachsmann	KL: A History of the Nazi Concentration Camps		Winner	
2016	N/A	Alison Pick	Between Gods		Shortlist	
2016	N/A	Claire Hajaj	Ishmael’s Oranges		Shortlist	
2016	N/A	Dan Stone	The Liberation of the Camps		Shortlist	
2016	N/A	George Prochnik	The Impossible Exile		Shortlist	
2016	N/A	Howard Jacobson	J		Shortlist	
2016	N/A	Zachary Leader	The Life of Saul Bellow		Shortlist	
2017	N/A	Ayelet Gundar-Goshen (trans. Sondra Silverston)	Waking Lions		Winner	
2017	N/A	Philippe Sands	East West Street: On the Origins of Genocide and Crimes Against Humanity		Winner	
2017	N/A	Anna Bikont (trans. Alissa Valles)	The Crime and the Silence		Shortlist	
2017	N/A	David Cesarani	Final Solution: The Fate of the Jews 1933-1949		Shortlist	
2017	N/A	Walter Kempowski (trans. Anthea Bell)	All for Nothing		Shortlist	
2018	N/A	Michael Frank	The Mighty Franks: A Memoir		Winner	
2018	N/A	George Prochnik	Stranger in a Strange Land: Searching for Gershom Scholem and Jerusalem		Shortlist	
2018	N/A	Joanne Limburg	Small Pieces: A Book of Lamentations		Shortlist	
2018	N/A	Laurence Rees	The Holocaust: A New History		Shortlist	
2018	N/A	Linda Grant	The Dark Circle		Shortlist	
2018	N/A	Mya Guarnieri Jaradat	The Unchosen: The Lives of Israel's New Others		Shortlist	
2019	N/A	Françoise Frenkel	No Place to Lay One's Head		Winner	
2019	N/A	Chloe Benjamin	The Immortalists	Tinder Press/Headline	Shortlist	
2019	N/A	Dara Horn	Eternal Life	W.W. Norton &Co Ltd	Shortlist	
2019	N/A	Lisa Halliday	Asymmetry	Granta	Shortlist	
2019	N/A	Mark Sarvas	Memento Park	Farrar, Straus & Giroux	Shortlist	
2019	N/A	Raphaël Jerusalmy (trans. Penny Hueston)	Evacuation	Text Publishing	Shortlist	
2020	N/A	Linda Grant	A Stranger City		Winner	
2020	N/A	Ayelet Gundar-Goshen	Liar		Shortlist	
2020	N/A	Benjamin Balint	Kafka's Last Trial: The Case of a Literacy Legacy		Shortlist	
2020	N/A	Dani Shapiro	Inheritance		Shortlist	
2020	N/A	Gary Shteyngart	Lake Success		Shortlist	
2020	N/A	George Szirtes	The Photographer at Sixteen		Shortlist	
2020	N/A	Howard Jacobson	Live a Little		Shortlist	
2021	N/A	Yaniv Iczkovits (trans. Orr Scharf)	The Slaughterman's Daughter	MacLehose Press / Schocken Books	Winner	
2021	N/A	Ariana Neumann	When Time Stopped: A Memoir of My Father's War and What Remains	Simon & Schuster	Shortlist	
2021	N/A	Bess Kalb	Nobody Will Tell You This But Me	Little, Brown	Shortlist	
2021	N/A	Colum McCann	Apeirogon	Bloomsbury	Shortlist	
2021	N/A	Goldie Goldbloom	On Division	Farrar, Straus and Giroux	Shortlist	
2021	N/A	Hadley Freeman	House of Glass	HarperCollins	Shortlist	
2021	N/A	Jonathan Safran Foer	We are the Weather: Saving the Planet Begins at Breakfast	Hamish Hamilton / Penguin Books	Shortlist	
2022	N/A	Nicole Krauss	To Be a Man	Bloomsbury	Winner	
2022	N/A	Anne Sebba	Ethel Rosenberg	St. Martins Press, Orion Books	Shortlist	
2022	N/A	Arthur Green	Judaism for the World	Yale University Press	Shortlist	
2022	N/A	Edmund de Waal	Letters to Camondo	Chatto & Windus/Vintage Publishing	Shortlist	
2022	N/A	Eshkol Nevo (trans. Sondra Silverston)	The Last Interview	Other Press	Shortlist	
2022	N/A	Nir Baram (trans. Jessica Cohen)	At Night's End	Text Publishing	Shortlist	
2022	N/A	Wendy Lower	The Ravine	Houghton Mifflin Harcourt	Shortlist	
2023	N/A	Simon Parkin	The Island of Extraordinary Captives	Sceptre	Winner	
2023	N/A	Gabrielle Zevin	Tomorrow, and Tomorrow, and Tomorrow	Chatto	Shortlist	
2023	N/A	Jeffrey Veidlinger	In the Midst of Civilised Europe	Picador	Shortlist	
2023	N/A	Linda Kinstler	Come to this Court and Cry	Bloomsbury Circus	Shortlist	
2023	N/A	Olga Tokarczuk (trans. Jennifer Croft)	The Books of Jacob	Fitzcarraldo Editions	Shortlist	
2023	N/A	Omer Friedlander	The Man Who Sold Air in the Holy Land	John Murray	Shortlist	
2023	N/A	Yishai Sarid (trans. Yardenne Greenspan)	The Memory Monster	Serpent's Tail	Shortlist	
2024	N/A	Elizabeth McCracken	The Hero of this Book	Jonathan Cape	Winner	
2024	N/A	Adina Talve-Goodman	Your Hearts, Your Scars	Bellevue Literary Press	Shortlist	
2024	N/A	Paul Goldberg	The Dissident	Farrar, Straus and Giroux	Shortlist	
2024	N/A	Janet Malcolm	Still Pictures	Granta Books (UK), Farrar, Straus and Giroux (USA)	Shortlist	
2024	N/A	Michael Twitty	Kosher Soul	Amistad, Harper Collins	Shortlist	
2024	N/A	Michael Frank	One Hundred Saturdays	Souvenir Press	Shortlist	
