= Traditions of Intolerance =

1989 book

Traditions of Intolerance: Historical Perspectives on Fascism and Race Discourse in Britain
- Editor: Tony Kushner and Kenneth Lunn
- Language: English
- Genre: Non-fiction
- Publisher: Manchester University Press
- Publication date: 1989
- Publication place: United Kingdom
- ISBN: 0-7190-2898-1

Traditions of Intolerance: Historical Perspectives on Fascism and Race Discourse in Britain is a book edited by Tony Kushner and Kenneth Lunn. It presented research into antisemitism, racism, and fascism in British society.

It is a selection of papers from an academic conference organised jointly by the University of Southampton and Portsmouth Polytechnic in Southampton, England, in September 1987. The conference was organised to address the new research opportunities opened up by the release of government records referred to as the 'Mosley Papers'.

It was published in 1989 by Manchester University Press as 245-page hardcover (ISBN 0-7190-2898-1). It was distributed in the United States and Canada by St. Martin's Press.

== Contents ==
Part	Chapter	Author	Subjects
	Acknowledgements		
	List of contributors		
	Introduction	Tony Kushner and Kenneth Lunn	
Part 1: Fascism, racism and culture	1: Jewish stereotyping and English literature, 1875–1920 : Towards a political analysis	Bryan Cheyette	
Part 1: Fascism, racism and culture	2: Imperial decline and the resurgence of English national identity, 1918–1979	Paul Rich	
Part 1: Fascism, racism and culture	3: Jewish responses to political antisemitism and fascism in the East End of London, 1920–1939	Elaine R. Smith	
Part 1: Fascism, racism and culture	4: The paradox of prejudice : the impact of organised antisemitism in Britain during an anti-Nazi war	Tony Kushner	
Part 1: Fascism, racism and culture	5: Racial attacks : the persistence of racial vigilantism in British cities	Christopher T. Husbands	
Part 2: Fascism in action, fascism and the State	6: Joynson-Hicks and the radical right in England after the First World War	David Cesarani	
Part 2: Fascism in action, fascism and the State	7: The ideology and impact of the British fascists in the 1920s	Kenneth Lunn	
Part 2: Fascism in action, fascism and the State	8: Intolerance and discretion : Conservatives and British fascism, 1918–1926	G.C. Webber	
Part 2: Fascism in action, fascism and the State	9: The "Mosley Papers" and the secret history of British fascism, 1939–1940	Richard Thurlow	
Part 2: Fascism in action, fascism and the State	10: Alexander Ratcliffe : militant Protestant and antisemite	Colin Holmes	
Part 2: Fascism in action, fascism and the State	11: Fascism and political racism in post-war Britain	Roger Eatwell	
	Index		
