= The Holocaust in Germany =

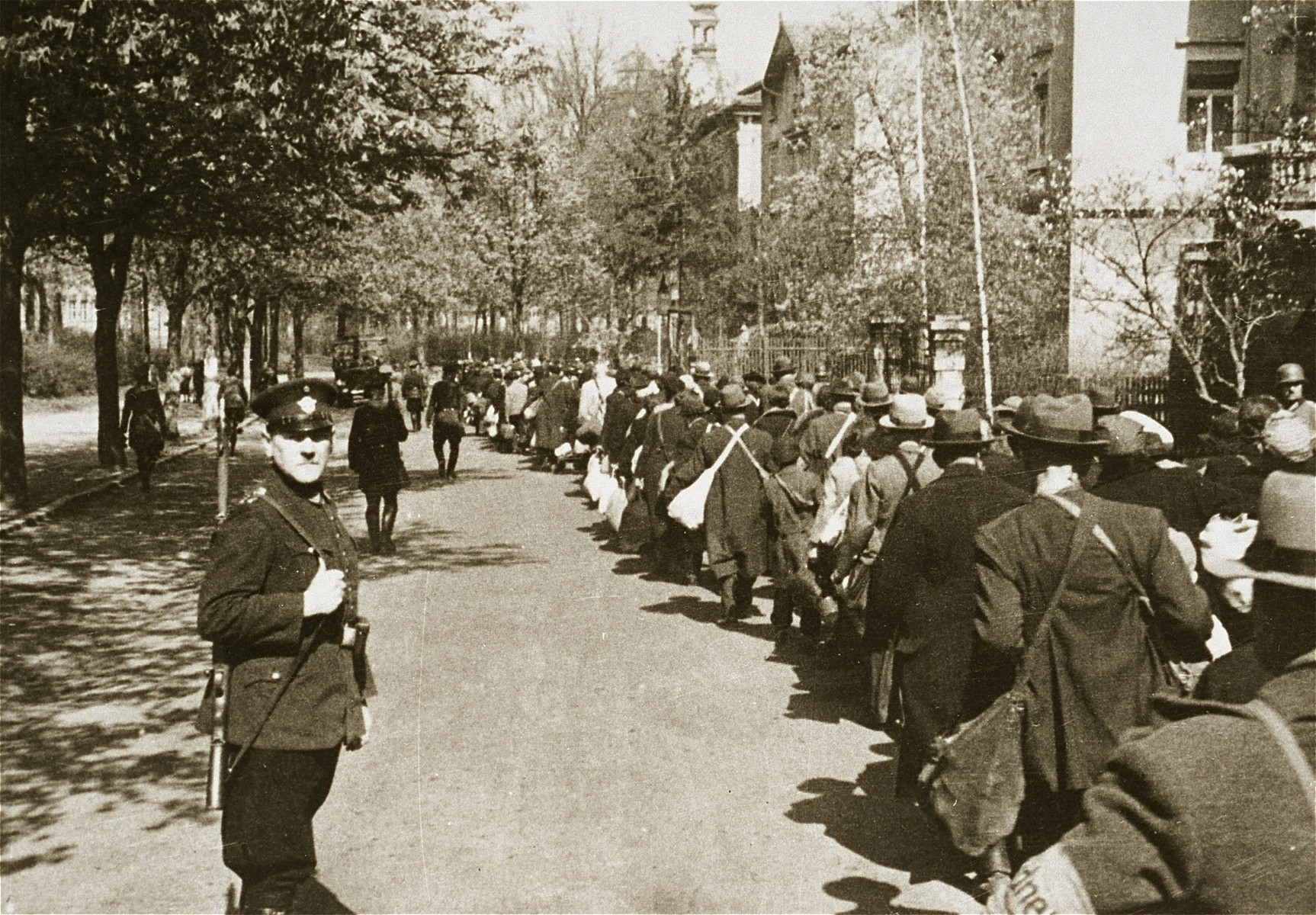
Jews are deported from Würzburg to the Lublin District, General Governorate, 25 April 1942.

Jews in Germany were systematically persecuted, deported, imprisoned, and murdered as part of the Europe-wide Holocaust perpetrated by Nazi Germany. Overall, of the 522,000 Jews living in Germany in January 1933, approximately 304,000 emigrated during the first six years of Nazi rule and about 214,000 were left on the eve of World War II. Of these, 160,000-180,000 were killed as a part of the Holocaust. On 19 May 1943, only about 20,000 Jews remained and Germany was declared judenrein.

== Background ==
In the 1920s, there were around 500,000 Jews living in Germany, making up less than 1 percent of the country's population. They enjoyed legal and social equality, and were wealthier on average than other Germans. The Jews of Germany were largely assimilated into the German society, although a minority were recent immigrants from eastern Europe. During the period of the Weimar Republic from 1919 to 1933, German Jews assumed an important role in the government of the country and held various positions in politics and diplomacy. Furthermore, they were prominent in economic, financial and cultural matters. During this period, there were also a number of active Jewish political and religious organizations, such as Centralverein deutscher Staatsbürger jüdischen Glaubens and Agudat Yisrael. However, the Jewish community of Germany faced several pressing issues, including the integration of eastern European Jews and growing antisemitism, which was fueled by the steady rise of Adolf Hitler and the Nazi Party (NSDAP).

== Prewar laws and policies ==
=== Anti-Jewish laws ===
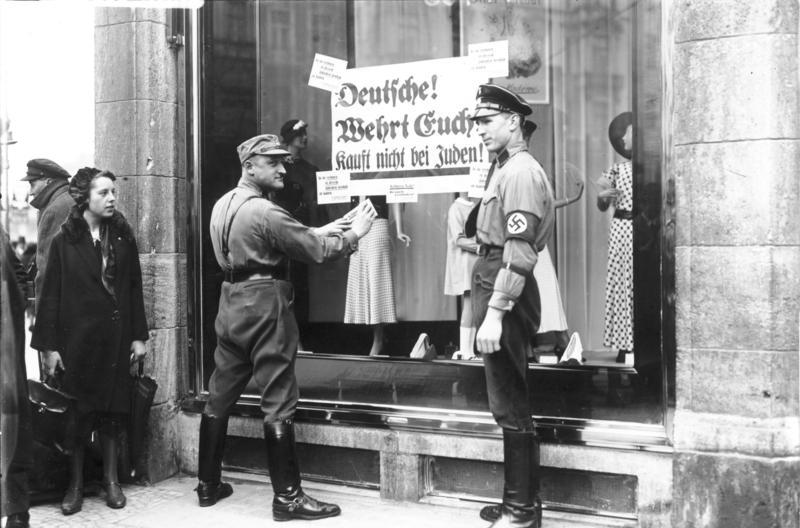
Boycott of Jewish stores and businesses staged on April 1, 1933 by the National Socialists

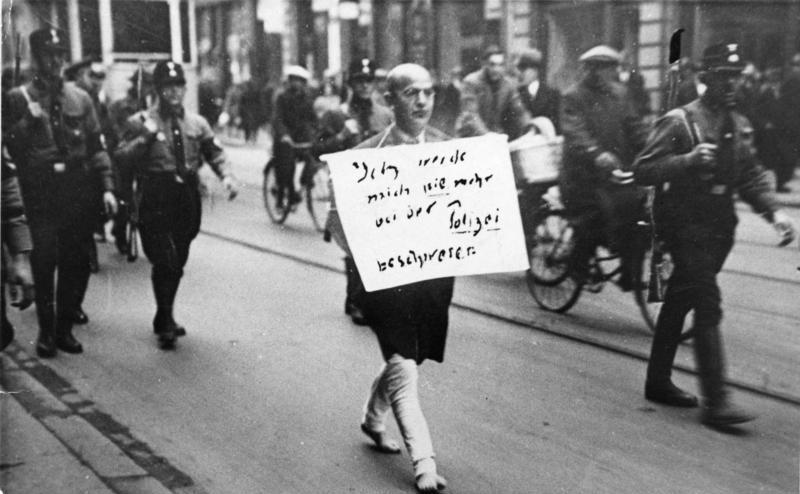
Nazi SA militants in 1933 forcing a Jewish lawyer in Munich to walk with a sign that says "I will never again complain to the police"

Throughout the 1930s, various German government agencies, Nazi Party organizations, and local authorities instituted a variety of anti-Jewish measures without centralized coordination. The first nationwide anti-Jewish laws were passed in 1933, when Jews were banned or restricted from several professions and the civil service. After hounding the German Jews out of public life by the end of 1934, the regime passed the Nuremberg Laws in 1935. The laws restricted full citizenship rights to those of "German or related blood", restricted Jews' economic activity, and criminalized new marriages and sexual relationships between Jews and non-Jewish Germans. Jews were defined as those with three or four Jewish grandparents.

In 1938 and 1939, another wave of legislation focused on forcing Jews out of economic life. They were barred from additional occupations such as real estate brokers or commercial agents, and forbidden to practice as doctors, pharmacists, dentists, or lawyers except for Jewish clients. The expropriation of Jewish businesses began in 1937 with their registration and enabled by a law passed in early 1938. In December 1938 a decree called for the shutdown of all Jewish businesses still in operation. Overall, the Nazis passed about 1,500 anti-Jewish laws.

The regime also sought to segregate Jews with a view to their ultimate disappearance from the country. Local anti-Jewish measures included signs declaring Jews unwelcome in a locality. Jews were banned from many spa towns and public amenities such as hospitals and recreational facilities. Jewish students were also gradually forced out of the school system. Some municipalities enacted restrictions governing where Jews were allowed to live or conduct business.

=== Anti-Jewish violence ===
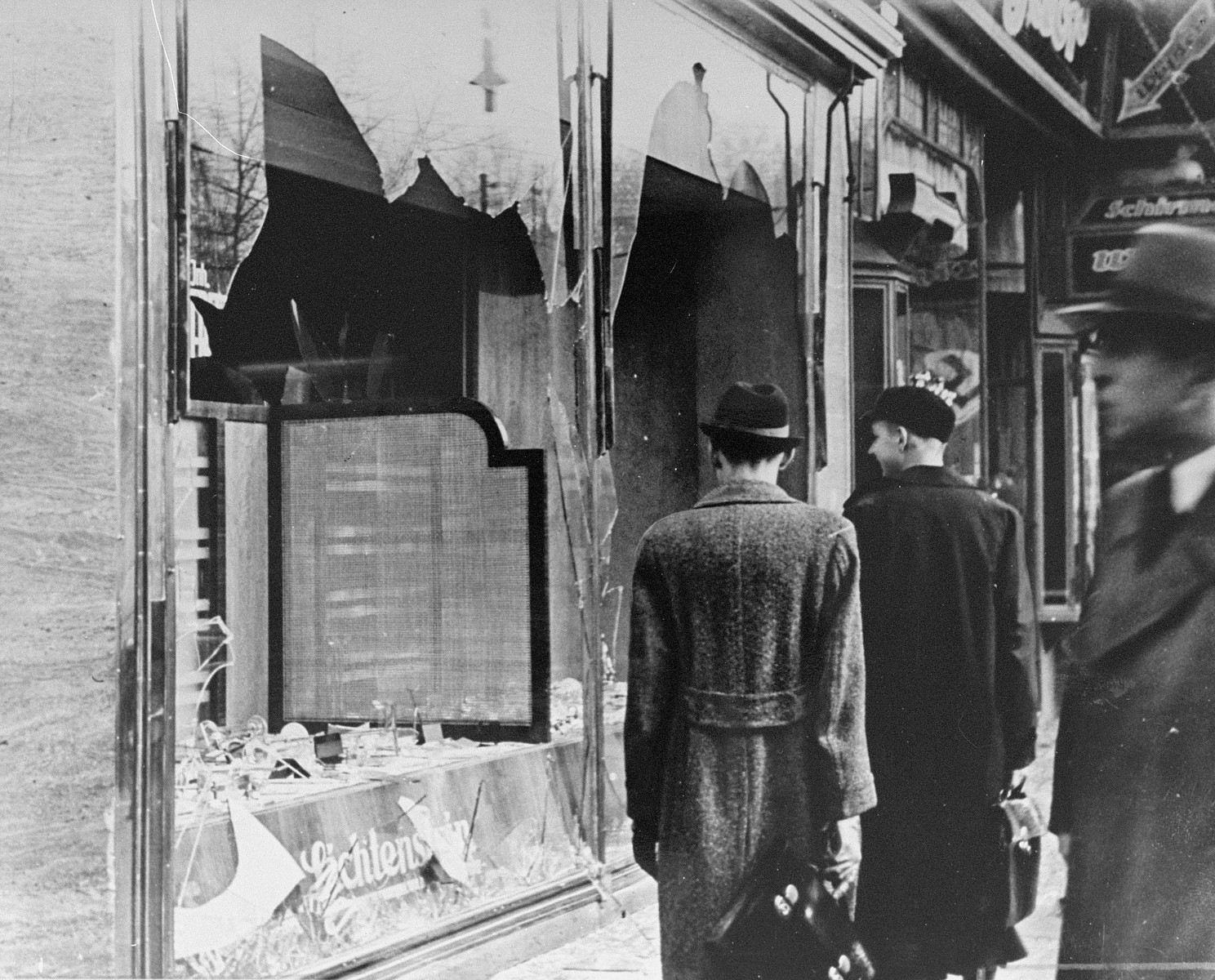
Jewish shop destroyed during Kristallnacht, 10 November 1938

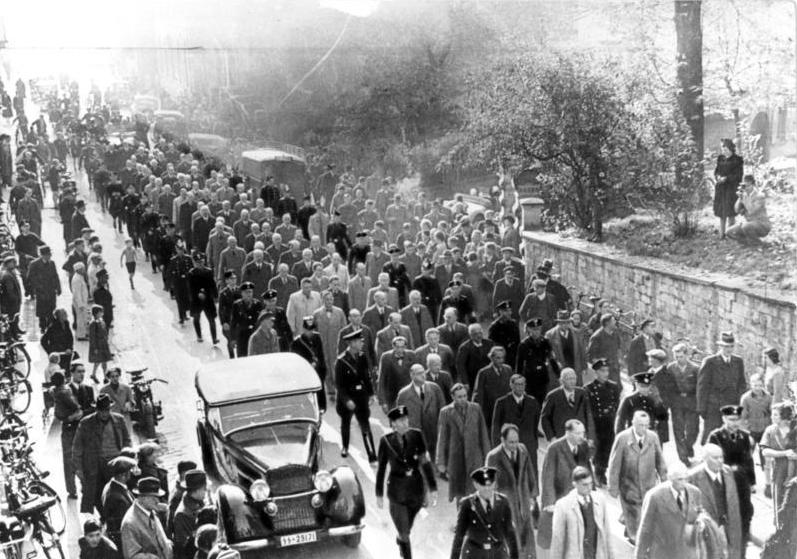
Mass arrest of Jews in Baden-Baden after the November pogroms

Anti-Jewish violence, largely locally organized by members of Nazi Party institutions, took primarily non-lethal forms from 1933 to 1939. Jewish stores, especially in rural areas, were often boycotted or vandalized. Jews were violently forced to leave some places or denied entry, while others were publicly humiliated for alleged sexual affairs with non-Jews. As a result, many small towns became entirely free of Jews and as many as a third of Jewish business owners may have been forced out of business before legally required. Anti-Jewish terror was even worse in areas annexed by Nazi Germany; in Austria, the SS and SA smashed shops and stole cars belonging to Jews. In the Sudetenland and Danzig, most Jews fled before the annexation or shortly afterwards.

On 9–10 November 1938, the Nazis organized a pogrom (Kristallnacht) throughout Germany that saw over 7,500 Jewish shops (out of 9,000) looted and over 1,000 synagogues damaged or destroyed. At least 90 Jews were murdered. The damage was estimated at 39 million Reichsmark. The regular police, Gestapo, SS and SA all took part. Between 9 and 16 November, 30,000 Jews were arrested, although many were released within weeks. German Jewry was held collectively responsible for restitution of the damage; they were also charged a special tax of over a billion Reichsmark.

=== Emigration ===
The Nazi government wanted to force all Jews to leave Germany. Intensified persecution in 1938 caused the rate of emigration to skyrocket. The 1938 Évian Conference was organized to help Jewish refugees, but was not successful at easing immigration restrictions. By the end of 1939, most Jews who could emigrate had already done so; those who remained behind were disproportionately elderly, poor, or female and could not obtain a visa. The plurality, around 110,000, left for the United States, while smaller numbers emigrated to South America, Shanghai, and South Africa. Palestine was the only location to which any German resettlement plan produced results, via the Haavara Agreement that resulted in the emigration of about 53,000 German Jews, who were allowed to transfer RM 100 million of their assets to Palestine by buying German goods. Germany also collected nearly 1 billion RM from mainly Jewish emigrants from the Reich Flight Tax. In October 1938, Germany deported many Polish Jews. The policy of forced emigration continued into 1940.

== U-boats ==
While many Jews managed to emigrate from Nazi Germany the ones who remained had to live illegally in broad daylight. They were colloquially as "U-boats" (U-Boote), deriving from how they 'submerged' while going through everyday life. Other names included Geflitzte (Dashers) and Getarnt (Camouflaged). They hid their identitites by improvisations, purposely hiding identying badges such as the mandatory Jewish star, and help from other Germans willing to defy the regime.

In Berlin, around 7,000 Jews hid from the Nazi regime. Around 1,700 survived until the city’s liberation by Russian troops in 1945. Notable survivors include Cioma Schönhaus, a graphic artist who produced numerous fake documents to help other Jews survive, and Marie Jalowicz Simon, who relied on multiple hiding places and quick thinking to evade the Gestapo.

== Forced labor camps ==
Beginning in 1938—especially in Greater Germany—many Jews were drafted into forced-labor camps (Zwangsarbeitslager für Juden) and segregated work details. These camps were often of a temporary nature and typically overseen by civilian authorities. Initially, the actual labor was not primarily of economic importance, but often consisted of meaningless work that was intended to humiliate the victims. However, during the war and with the increased need for laborers in the armaments industry, the prisoners were made to work in factories and other industrial sites.

Ultimately, the camps were intended to be a place of "destruction through work" and served as a transition from forced labor to physical annihilation. The fine line between forced labor camps and extermination sites, in which systematic killing was carried out, was particularly blurred in occupied Poland and the occupied territories of the Soviet Union. During the last year of the war, people of partial Jewish descent and non-Jewish partners in mixed marriages were arrested and imprisoned in one hundred such camps. After 1943, many of the camps were integrated into the larger network of Nazi concentration camps.

== Deportation to ghettos and extermination camps ==
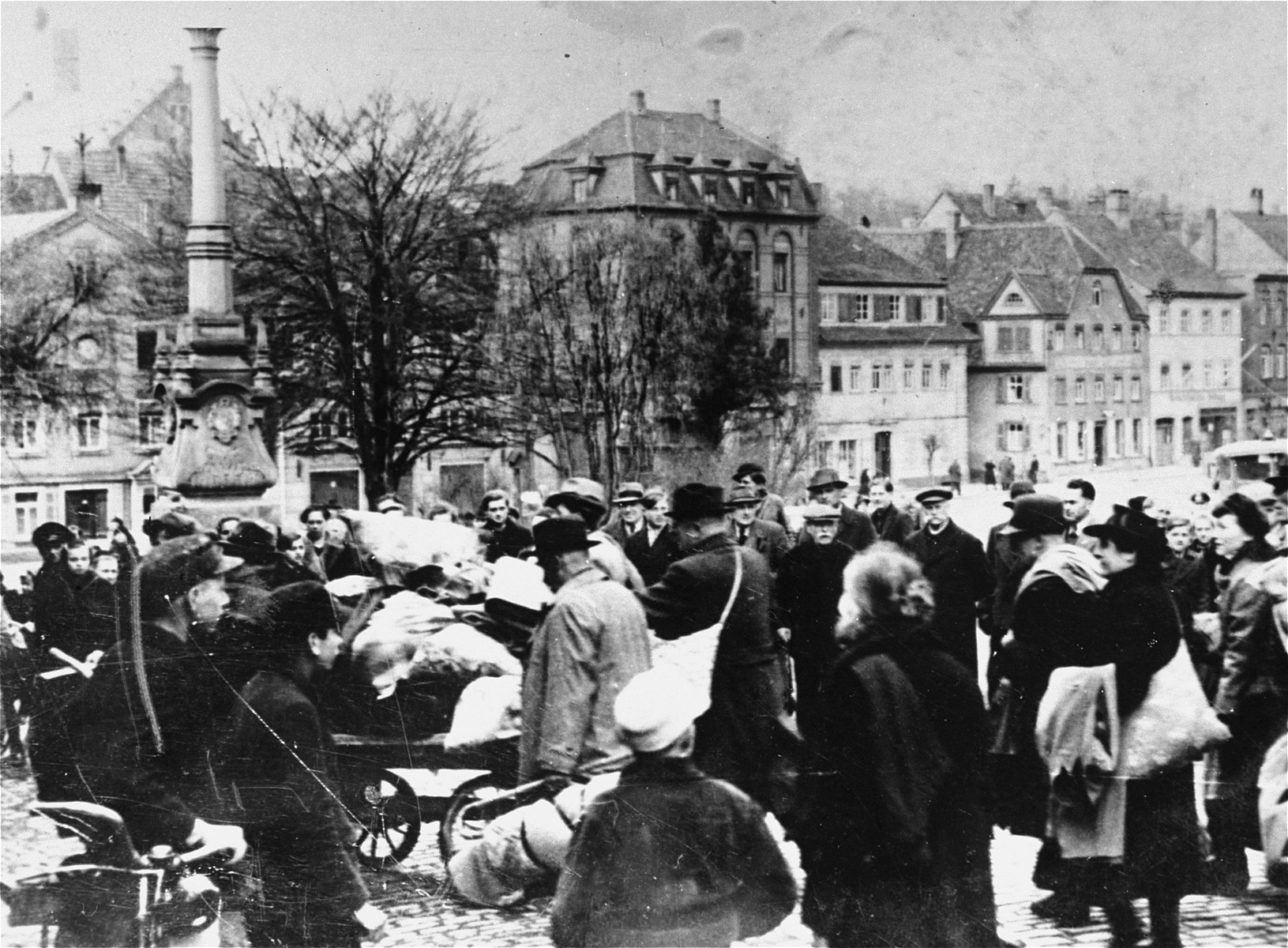
Local residents look on as a group of Jewish deportees arrives at the Fränkischen Hof assembly center during a deportation action in Kitzingen, 24 March 1942.

At the beginning of September 1941, all German Jews were required to wear a yellow star, and later that month, Hitler decided to deport them to the east. In conjunction with the mass deportation, emigration was banned. By the end of 1941, 42,000 Jews from Greater Germany and 5,000 Romani people from Austria had been deported to Łódź, Kovno, Riga, and Minsk, where most were not immediately executed. In late November, 5,000 German Jews were shot outside of Kovno and another 1,000 near Riga, but Heinrich Himmler ordered an end to such massacres and some in the senior Nazi leadership voiced doubts about killing German Jews. Executions of German Jews in the Baltic States resumed in early 1942. Thomas Fuchs writes that Hitler often issued instructions regarding the genocide verbally to Himmler rather than through written directives. This practice helped avoid a direct documentary trail linking Hitler to the extermination program and reflected broader efforts by the Nazi leadership to conceal the mass murder of European Jews.

Around 55,000 German Jews were deported between March and June 1942, mainly to ghettos in the Lublin District of the General Governorate whose inhabitants had shortly before been killed in Belzec. Many able-bodied men were removed from the transports at Majdanek for forced labor. From mid-June some transports were directed to Sobibor where most deportees were immediately murdered. Others were deported to Minsk where instead of being imprisoned in the ghetto, almost all were immediately killed at Maly Trostinets. In late 1942 additional Jews from Greater Germany were deported to killing centers or ghettos in Eastern Europe.

Although the Nazis' goal of eliminating any Jewish population from Germany had largely been achieved in 1943, it was reversed in 1944 with the deportation of around 200,000 Jews from Greater Hungary due to increasing demand for labor.

== Aftermath ==
When the war ended, there were less than 28,000 German Jews and 60,000 survivors from elsewhere in Germany. By 1947, the population had increased to 250,000 owing to emigration from Eastern Bloc countries sanctioned by the communist authorities; Jews made up around 25 percent of the population of displaced persons camps. Although many survivors were in poor health, they attempted to organize self-government in these camps, including education and rehabilitation efforts. Due to the reluctance of other countries to allow their immigration, many survivors remained in Germany until the establishment of Israel in 1948. Others emigrated to the United States around 1950 due to loosened emigration restrictions.

== Sources ==
- Beorn, Waitman Wade (2018). The Holocaust in Eastern Europe: At the Epicenter of the Final Solution. Bloomsbury Academic. ISBN 978-1-4742-3219-7.
- Cesarani, David (2016). Final Solution: The Fate of the Jews 1933–1949. St. Martin's Press. ISBN 978-0230768918.
- Dean, Martin C. (2020). "Survivors of the Holocaust within the Nazi Universe of Camps". A Companion to the Holocaust. John Wiley & Sons. pp. 263–277. ISBN 978-1-118-97049-2.
- Gerlach, Christian (2016). The Extermination of the European Jews. Cambridge University Press. ISBN 978-0-521-70689-6.
- Longerich, Peter (2010). Holocaust: The Nazi Persecution and Murder of the Jews. Oxford University Press. ISBN 978-0-19-280436-5.
- Evans, Richard J. (2005). The Third Reich in Power. New York: Penguin. ISBN 1-59420-074-2.
- Ericksen, Robert P. (2012). Complicity in the Holocaust: Churches and Universities in Nazi Germany. Cambridge University Press. ISBN 978-1-107-01591-3.
- Kochavi, Arieh J. (2010). "Liberation and Dispersal". The Oxford Handbook of Holocaust Studies. Oxford University Press. pp. 509–523. ISBN 978-0-19-921186-9.
- Gruner, Wolf (2005). "Local Initiatives, Central Coordination: German Municipal Administration and the Holocaust". Networks of Nazi Persecution: Bureaucracy, Business and the Organization of the Holocaust (1 ed.). Berghahn Books. pp. 269–294. ISBN 978-1-84545-163-9. JSTOR j.ctt9qd8kr.20.
- Gruner, Wolf (2014). The Persecution of the Jews in Berlin, 1933-1945: A Chronology of Measures by the Authorities in the German Capital. Berlin: Stiftung Topographie des Terrors. ISBN 978-3-941772-14-4.
- Löw, Andrea; Bergen, Doris L.; Hájková, Anna, eds. (2014). Alltag im Holocaust: Jüdisches Leben im Großdeutschen Reich 1941-1945 [Everyday Life during the Holocaust: Jewish Lives in the Greater German Reich, 1941–1945] (in German). Walter de Gruyter GmbH. ISBN 978-3-486-73567-3.
- Lutjens, Richard N. (2019). Lutjens, Richard N. (ed.). Submerged on the Surface: The Not-So-Hidden Jews of Nazi Berlin, 1941–1945. Berghahn Books. doi:10.2307/j.ctvvb7n02. ISBN 978-1-78533-455-9. JSTOR j.ctvvb7n02.
- Meyer, Beate; Simon, Hermann; Schütz, Chana (2009). Jews in Nazi Berlin: From Kristallnacht to Liberation. University of Chicago Press. ISBN 978-0-226-52159-6.
- Miron, Guy (2023). Space and Time Under Persecution: The German-Jewish Experience in the Third Reich. University of Chicago Press. ISBN 978-0-226-82815-2.
- Nicosia, Francis R. (2008). Zionism and Anti-Semitism in Nazi Germany. Cambridge: Cambridge University Press. ISBN 978-0-521-88392-4.
- Zimmermann, Moshe (2022). Germans against Germans: The Fate of the Jews, 1938–1945. Indiana University Press. ISBN 978-0-253-06232-1.
