= Mona Yahia =

Iraqi artist and writer

Mona Yahia (born 1954 in Baghdad, Iraq) is a writer and an artist; she publishes novels, stories, short stories and participates in art exhibitions and events.

== Life and career ==
Mona Yahia was born and raised in Baghdad, fled with her family to Iran in 1970, and from there immigrated to Israel. She did her military service between 1972 and 1974 and then studied psychology and French at the University of Tel Aviv. After a one-year stay in Paris, she went on to study clinical psychology in Tel Aviv and worked as a psychologist. In 1985 she moved to Germany to study fine arts at the Academy of Arts in Kassel with Harry Kramer. During these years she used photographs and everyday objects (soap, postcards, beer mats, cinnamon stars) to comment the culture of remembrance of the German society with regard to the Shoah.

In 2000, Mona Yahia published her first novel in London.When the Grey Beetles Took over Baghdad portrays Jewish life in Baghdad in the 1960s and the plight of the Jewish community after the Six Day War from the point of view of a teenager and in 2003 the Price of the Jury der Jungen Leser in Vienna/Austria. The novel saw translations into German (2002), French (2006), and Hebrew (2023).

Mona Yahia lives and works in Cologne, Germany - and writes in English.

== Selected works ==
- Domino Effect. In: London Magazine, vol. 33 no. 1&2, London 1993.
- METRO–BOULOT–DODO. In: Heiner Schepers (Hrsg.): Eine Stunde für Harry Kramer. Buxus Verlag, Lingen 1997, ISBN 3-933038-00-6.
- When the Grey Beetles Took over Baghdad. Peter Halban Publishers, London 2000, ISBN 1-870015-74-6; paperback 1-870015-85-1; American edition: George Braziller New York, 2007 ISBN 978-0807615829.
- A Borrowed Tongue (Essay). In: Fikrun wa Fann/Art and Thought Nr. 91, Goethe Institute, Munich 2009.
- Der Tag, an dem Sadat nach Jerusalem flog In: Kerstin Schimmel (Ed.): Auch dein Herz ..., Mitteldeutscher Verlag Halle (Saale) 2011, ISBN 978-3898128179.
- Love Traps. Kindle Edition, 2013 (ASIN: B00E8ODI1W).
- The Historical Khans of Istanbul: A Photographic Documentary Project (bilingual: English & German), 2015, ISBN 978-3-00-051806-5.
- SNAPSHOTS: Istanbul Behind Closed Doors (trilingual: German / Turkish / English), 2019, ISBN 978-3-943562-675.
- MATCHES (short story). In: Banipal no.72, 2021, ISBN 978-1913043285.
- WHO BY WATER. Contribution to the exhibition YALLA - Arab-Jewish Encounters in the Jewish Museum of Hohenems/Austria
- VIER TAGE. A novel. Salon LiteraturVerlag, Münich/Germany, 2025. ISBN 978-3947-404520.
- FIRST SOLDIER IN THE FAMILY: English Excerpt from the novel FOUR DAYS (published 2025 in German under the title VIER TAGE)

== Awards ==
When the Grey Beetles Took over Baghdad won the Jewish Quarterly-Wingate Literary Prize for Fiction in 2001, and in 2003 the Jury's Prize der Jungen Leser in Vienna, Austria.

Yahia spent nearly one year as writer-in-residence in Istanbul – 2013/14, in the “Atelier Galata”, a program established by the Arts Council of the city of Cologne, and again in 2017 under the same program, funded by the Kunststiftung NRW, Düsseldorf.
