= Douglas Reed =

British journalist and writer (1895–1976)

Douglas Lancelot Reed (11 March 1895 – 26 August 1976) was a British novelist and political commentator. His book Insanity Fair (1938) examined the state of Europe and the megalomania of Adolf Hitler before World War II. Subsequently, Reed believed in a long-term Zionist conspiracy to impose a world government on an enslaved humanity. He was also staunchly anti-Communist, and once wrote that Nazism was a "stooge or stalking horse" meant to further the aims of the "Communist Empire." When The Times ran his obituary, it condemned Reed as a "virulent antisemite".

== Biography ==
At the age of 13, Reed began working as an office boy, and at 19, a bank clerk. At the outbreak of World War I he enlisted in the British Army. He transferred to the Royal Flying Corps, gaining a single kill in aerial combat and severely burning his face in a flying accident (Insanity Fair, 1938). Around 1921, he began working as a telephonist and clerk for The Times. At the age of 30, he became a sub-editor. In 1927, he became assistant correspondent in Berlin, later transferring to Vienna as chief central European correspondent. He went on to report from European centres including Warsaw, Moscow, Prague, Athens, Sofia, Bucharest and Budapest.

According to Reed, he resigned his job in protest against the appeasement of Hitler after the Munich Agreement of 1938. In Somewhere South of Suez: a further survey of the grand design of the Twentieth Century (1949), Reed wrote that his resignation came in response to press censorship which prevented him from fully reporting "the facts about Hitler and National Socialism." He believed that by becoming a "journalist without a newspaper," he would be free to write as he chose.

His 1938 book Insanity Fair analysing the situation in pre-war Europe brought him worldwide fame. His next few books were also bestsellers.

Reed spent the duration of the Second World War in England; in 1948, he moved to Durban, South Africa. In his 1951 book Far and Wide he wrote: "During the Second World War I noticed that the figures of Jewish losses, in places where war made verification impossible, were being irresponsibly inflated, and said so in a book. The process continued until the war's end when the figure of six millions was produced… No proof can be given". Reed was subsequently banned by established publishers and booksellers, and his previous titles were often removed from library shelves.

His career as a published author effectively over, Reed nevertheless spent several years, including in New York and Montreal, working on his magnum opus The Controversy of Zion. Despite some initial discussions with a publisher, the manuscript was never submitted.

In the 1960s Reed opposed the decolonization of Africa. In his The Battle for Rhodesia (1966) he explicitly compared decolonization to the appeasement of Hitler; he supported Ian Smith's unilateral declaration of independence from the United Kingdom, arguing that Smith's Rhodesia had to be defended as "the last bulwark against the Third World War", just as Czechoslovakia should have been defended against Hitler in 1938.

Reed died in Durban in 1976. Two years later The Controversy of Zion was finally brought to print, the manuscript having lain on top of a wardrobe in Reed's home for over two decades.

== Criticism ==
Richard Thurlow wrote that Reed was one of the first antisemitic writers to deny Hitler's extermination of the Jews.

In a review of Reed's Lest We Regret written in 1943, George Orwell compared Reed, with his unheeded early warnings about the Nazis, to the Greek mythological figure Cassandra. Orwell wrote that Reed dismissed the Nazis' persecution of German Jews, and even the pogroms, as just "propaganda." Reed cited a story in the Daily Herald about Germans in football clothes playing football with 500 Jewish babies in a football stadium near Kiev "bouncing and kicking them around the arena." This story had also been dismissed in the New Statesman as "complete fabrication" and "nonsense." Orwell summed-up Reed's book as: "the dominant notes being back to the land, more emigration, down with the Reds and—above all—down with the Jews." Orwell warned that Reed had an "easy journalistic style", stating he was a "persuasive writer" through which he was "capable of doing a lot of harm among the large public for which he caters." Orwell compared Reed's outlook to that of the anti-Hitlerian Nazi dissident Otto Strasser and the British fascist leader Oswald Mosley.

== Works ==
=== Articles ===
- "The German Church Conflict." Foreign Affairs, vol. 13, no. 3 (April 1935), pp. 483–498. Full issue.

=== Books ===
- The Burning of the Reichstag (1934)
- Insanity Fair: A European Cavalcade (Jonathan Cape, 1938)
- Disgrace Abounding (do., 1939)
- Fire and Bomb: A comparison between the burning of the Reichstag and the bomb explosion at Munich (do., 1940)
- Nemesis? The Story of Otto Strasser (do., 1940)
- History in My Time by Otto Strasser (translated from the German by Douglas Reed), (do, 1941)
- A Prophet at Home (do., 1941)
- All Our Tomorrows (do., 1942)
- Downfall, play (do., 1942)
- Lest We Regret (do., 1943)
- The Next Horizon: Or, Yeomans' Progress, novel (do., 1945)
- Galanty Show, novel, (do., 1947)
- From Smoke to Smother (1938–1948): A Sequel to Insanity Fair (do., 1948)
- Reasons of Health, novel, (do., 1949)
- Somewhere South of Suez: A further survey of the grand design of the twentieth century (do., 1949)
- Far and Wide (do., 1951)
- Prisoner of Ottawa: Otto Strasser (1953)
- The Battle for Rhodesia (HAUM, 1966)
- The Siege of Southern Africa (Macmillan, Johannesburg, 1974), ISBN 0-86954-014-9
- Behind the Scene (Part 2 of Far and Wide) (Dolphin Press, 1975; Noontide Press, 1976, ISBN 0-911038-41-8)
- The Grand Design of the 20th Century (Dolphin Press, 1977)
- The Controversy of Zion (1978). Completed in 1956.
- Rule of Three, novel
