= Whitehall and the Jews, 1933–1948 =

2000 book by Louise London

Whitehall and the Jews, 1933-1948: British Immigration Policy, Jewish Refugees and the Holocaust
- Author: Louise London
- Language: English
- Genre: History
- Publisher: Cambridge University Press
- Publication date: 2000
- Publication place: United Kingdom
- ISBN: 0-521-63187-4

Whitehall and the Jews, 1933–1948: British Immigration Policy, Jewish Refugees and the Holocaust, is a book by Louise London, first published by Cambridge University Press in 2000. It details the British government's response to refugees fleeing persecution in Nazi Europe between the years 1933 and 1948.

London challenges the belief that prewar Britain was a safe house, and estimates that a large number of European Jews were prevented entry as a result of immigration policy at the time. The book is used to debate the kindertransport as too simplistic and overwhelmingly positive, as London questions what happened to the parents and elder siblings of the children who were left behind.

In 2001, the book was shortlisted for the Jewish Quarterly-Wingate Prize. In the same year, Rory Miller and Richard Thurlow described it as scholarly. The following year, Todd Endelman rated the book as the best account of British refugee policy. In The Jewish Quarterly Review (2003), Susan Cohen notes that it would be easy to make parallels with later immigrant stories.

== Layout ==
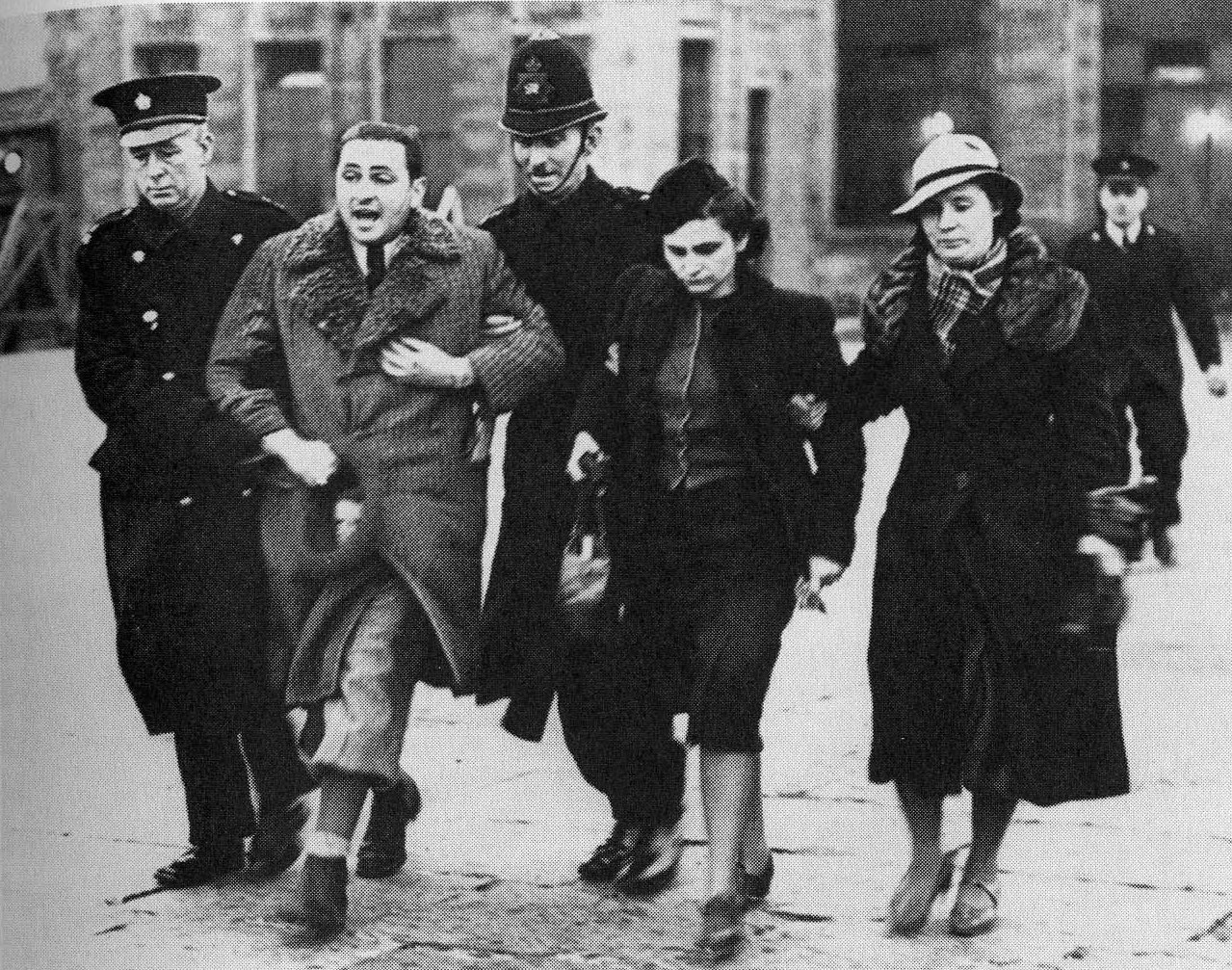
Jewish refugees escorted out of Croydon airport, 1939

Whitehall and the Jews, 1933-1948, is a book by Louise London, first published by Cambridge University Press in 2000. It has 313 pages, covering a preface, nine chapters followed by a conclusion, two appendices detailing biographical notes and Home Secretary and Home Office permanent under secretaries (1906-1950) respectively, and an index preceded by a bibliography. It contains several images, including two of Jewish refugees from Czechoslovakia after landing at Croydon Airport in 1939; one of police escorting a group away from the airport, also used for the front cover, and another of a man slumped in a seat in the departure hall, in disbelief that he is granted permission to stay. There is also an image of an elderly Jewish refugee arriving at the Port of Southampton, and of over 200 refugee children, part of the kindertransport, arriving at Liverpool Street Station.

== Background ==
London, who writes on the "rights of aliens", is a former immigration lawyer, and daughter of a refugee from Eastern Europe. Her book is based on her thesis completed in 1992 from the University of London.

== Content ==
The book details how the British government responded to refugees fleeing persecution in Nazi Europe between the years 1933 and 1948. London challenges the belief that prewar Britain was the safe house it was made out to be. She writes that immigration policy “was designed to keep out large numbers of European Jews - perhaps 10 times as many as it let in”.

The myth was born that Britain did all it could for the Jews between 1933 and 1945. This comfortable view has proved remarkably durable, and is still adduced to support claims that Britain has always admitted genuine refugees, and that the latest harsh measures against asylum seekers are merely designed to exclude bogus applicants. . .We remember the touching photographs and newsreel footage of unaccompanied Jewish children arriving on the Kindertransports [by July 1939, 7,700 had arrived, compared with 1,850 admitted into Holland, 800 into France, 700 into Belgium, and 250 into Sweden]. There are no such photographs of the Jewish parents left behind in Nazi Europe. . .The Jews excluded from entry to the United Kingdom are not part of the British experience, because Britain never saw them. . .Memories of the unsuccessful public campaign to persuade the government to rescue Jews from mass murder faded quickly.

London estimates the numbers of Jews escaping Germany between 1933 and 1945; 18,000 to Shanghai, 140,000 to Palestine, 85,000 to Latin America, 6,500 to Australia, 250,000 to the US and over 80,000 to the UK. She details the Aliens Act 1905, the introduction of immigration controls and visas, and the private charities that assisted the first Jewish refugees.

== Response and reviews ==
The Initial response in the Independent, by Julia Pascal, called the book both "admirable" and a "disturbing read". Todd Endelman, notes in his book The Jews of Britain, 1656-2000 (2002), that London's book on the topic is the best account of British refugee policy.

Rory Miller, in The International History Review, described it as a scholarly addition to the historical interest in Jewish immigration. In The Economic History Review, Richard Thurlow calls it "a highly valuable addition to the literature of a highly controversial topic". He says that London provides evidence for both sides of the argument, her work on the 1930s is more precise compared to the period during the War, when public opinion changed significantly, and on the whole is "thought-provoking". Jeffrey M. Togman wrote the review in International Migration Review.

== Interpretation ==
The book is used to debate the kindertransport, as London asks what happened to the parents and elder siblings of the children who "did not come to Britain and are thus not part of the story". Her note of a lack of images of the parents left behind has been used to support the notion that the kindertransport story is too simplistic and overwhelmingly positive.

In The Jewish Quarterly Review, Susan Cohen notes that it would be easy to make parallels with later immigrants, "and to replace Jews with Bosnians or another ethnic group". Steve Paullson, historian and expert in Holocaust studies, makes similar parallels, but to be interpreted as such with caution.. "the Holocaust is a limiting case, a "plight of refugees" that developed as far as it possibly could into a campaign of total extermination—under conditions, of course, of total war. It would be wrong, therefore, to view Louise London's book as mainly a source of ammunition for present-day polemics. Still, it provides much food for thought". Regarding the restrictions of entry stemming from immigration policy being particularly more restrictive for Jewish refugees from Sudetenland, he points out that "Britain did not know, of course, that they would soon fall into the hands of the Nazis."

== Awards ==
It was shortlisted for the Jewish Quarterly-Wingate Prize in 2001.

== Sequelae ==
In 2008, London published an article titled "Whitehall and the Refugees: The 1930s and the 1990s", in which her comparisons claim that "the same worry about the long-term effects of immigration—that is, that refugees would settle in the country and not return home or move on—that very much influenced the tendency to inhibit aid to Jewish refugees in the 1930s and 1940s, is still very much alive today." In 2021 she published "The Agenda of British Refugee Policy, 1933–48", in which she writes that refugee policy "is policy on refugees, not for them".
