= Dark circle (disambiguation) =

Periorbital dark circles are dark blemishes around the eyes

Dark circle may also refer to:

- Dark Circle, a fictional criminal organization in the DC Comics universe
- Dark Circle Comics, an imprint of Archie Comics
- Dark Circle (film), a 1982 American documentary film about the nuclear weapons and nuclear power industries
- Dark Circles, a 2013 American horror film starring Johnathon Schaech and Pell James
- The Dark Circle, a 2016 novel by Linda Grant
