= Ian Thomson (writer) =

English writer (born 1961)

Ian Thomson FRSL
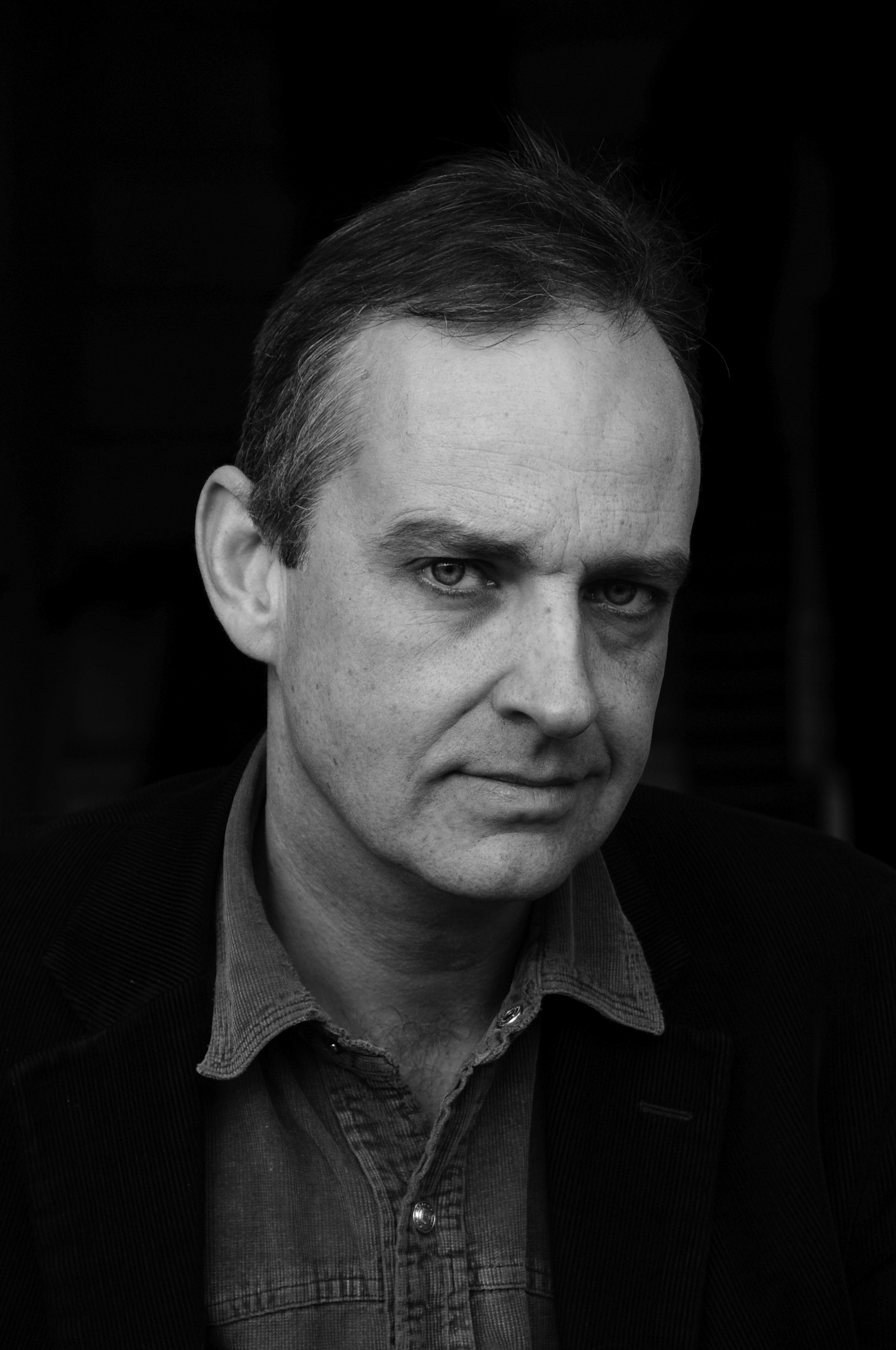
- Ian Thomson in Jamaica
- Born: 1961 (age 64–65)
- Education: Pembroke College, Cambridge
- Writing career
- Notable works: Primo Levi (biography; 2002), The Dead Yard: Tales of Modern Jamaica (reportage; 2009), Dante's Divine Comedy: A Journey Without End (criticism; 2018)

Ian Thomson FRSL (born 1961) is an English author, best known for his biography Primo Levi (2002), and reportage, The Dead Yard: Tales of Modern Jamaica (2009).

== Biography ==
Ian Thomson was born in London in 1961. His parents moved to New York City that same year, where his father worked for a Wall Street bank. (His mother, a Baltic émigrée, came to England in 1947 at the age of 17.) Thomson was educated at Dulwich College, then at Pembroke College, Cambridge, where he read English. He is the godson of the British painter Carel Weight. In the 1980s he taught English literature and English as a foreign language in Rome, then became a translator, journalist and writer, contributing to the Sunday Times Magazine, The Independent, The Guardian, The Observer, The Spectator and Times Literary Supplement. He was Royal Literary Fund Fellow at the University College London. Currently he is a Senior Lecturer in Creative Non-Fiction at the University of East Anglia. He is a Fellow of the Royal Society of Literature (RSL).

His first important book, Bonjour Blanc: A Journey Through Haiti (1992), an amalgam of history and adventure, was recommended by J. G. Ballard as "hair-raising but hugely entertaining", and by the film director Jonathan Demme as "a great and abiding classic". His book, Primo Levi (2002), a biography, took 10 years to write and is seen today as the definitive life of the Italian writer and concentration camp survivor. It won the RSL's W. H. Heinemann Award and was shortlisted for the Jewish Quarterly′s Wingate Literary Prize and the Koret Jewish Book Award. (A centenary edition of the biography was published in 2019, fully updated and with a new preface, as Primo Levi: The Elements of a Life.)

In 2005 Thomson went back to the West Indies to write The Dead Yard: Tales of Modern Jamaica (2009), seen by some as one of the most controversial books written on Jamaica. In 2010 The Dead Yard was awarded the Royal Society of Literature's Ondaatje Prize as well as the Dolman Travel Book Award. Zadie Smith spoke of it in Harper's Magazine as a "truly excellent book".

Thomson edited Articles of Faith: The Collected Tablet Journalism of Graham Greene (2006), and contributed a short story to Kingston Noir (2012), a collection of fiction set in the Jamaican capital by various contemporary writers. In 2011, he donated the memoir, Fall and Rise of a Rome Patient, to Oxfam’s "OxTravel" project, a collection of UK articles by 36 writers. Thomson has translated the Sicilian crime writer Leonardo Sciascia into English, and has lectured at Columbia University, Princeton University and the Royal Society, London.

Dante's Journey: A Journey Without End (2018), Ian Thomson's "biography" of Dante's great poem, was a Financial Times and Times Literary Supplement Book of the Year.

In 2022 an interview Thomson conducted in Sicily with Leonardo Sciascia at the age of 24 was published as a book, Una conversazione a Palermo con Leonardo Sciascia; it contained a correspondence between Thomson and Sciascia.

Ian Thomson lives in London with his wife and children.

== Selected bibliography ==
- 1989 Southern Italy
- 1992 Bonjour Blanc: A Journey Through Haiti
- 2002 Primo Levi: A Life
- 2007 Articles of Faith: Graham Greene’s Contributions to The Tablet
- 2009 The Dead Yard: Tales of Modern Jamaica
- 2012 Kingston Noir
- 2018 Dante's Divine Comedy: A Journey Without End
- 2019 Primo Levi: The Elements of a Life
- 2022 Ian Thomson: Una conversazione a Palermo con Leonardo Sciascia (Rubbettino Editore, Soveria Manelli, Italy)

== Awards and prizes ==
- 1988 Society of Authors Foundation Grant Primo Levi: A Life
- 2002 Royal Society of Literature W.H. Heinemann Award Primo Levi: A Life
- 2009 Society of Authors Foundation Grant The Dead Yard: Tales of Modern Jamaica
- 2010 Royal Society of Literature Ondaatje Prize The Dead Yard: Tales of Modern Jamaica
- 2010 Dolman Travel Book Award The Dead Yard: Tales of Modern Jamaica
