= Munro Price =

British historian

Prof. Munro Price
- Born: 1963 (age 62–63); London, England, United Kingdom
- Years active: 1981–present
- Known for: Historian and author
- Parent(s): Stanley Price and Judy Price
- Awards: Franco-British Society’s Enid McLeod Literary Prize

Academic background
- Education: University College School, Gonville and Caius College, Cambridge
- Doctoral advisor: T. C. W. Blanning

Academic work
- Discipline: French and European History
- Notable works: The Fall of the French Monarchy, The Perilous Crown

Munro Price is a British historian noted for his work on French history.

== Early life ==
Price was born (February 1963) in London to playwright and author Stanley Price and his wife Judy (née Fenton) and raised in Highgate.

== Education ==
Price was educated at University College School and Cambridge University, where he gained a First Class Degree in History before going on to study for his PhD under the supervision of T. C. W. Blanning.

Price was active in politics while at Cambridge, becoming president of Cambridge University Social Democrats, the university's SDP society.

== Career ==
For most of his academic career Price was based at the University of Bradford, where he was professor of Modern European History in the Department of Peace Studies. He also taught at the University of Swansea and the University of Lyon.

== Noted works ==
Known for his writings on French history from the time of the French Revolution through to Louis Philippe, Price has published several books and articles on the period, including The Fall of the French Monarchy: Louis XVI, Marie Antoinette and the baron de Breteuil (2002), winner of the Franco-British Society's Enid McLeod Literary Prize, and Napoleon: the End of Glory (2015) which has since been translated into German.

Price has also co-authored The Road to Apocalypse: The Extraordinary Journey of Lewis Way with his father, Stanley Price, focussing on the origins of the Evangelical Christian Zionist movement in early 19th century Britain and Europe.

== Media ==
Contributing towards television programmes focussed on his area of expertise, Price has appeared in several documentaries in English and French language.

== Bibliography ==
- Preserving the Monarchy: the comte de Vergennes. 1774-1787, (Cambridge University Press, 1995)
- Louis XVI and the comte de Vergennes: correspondence, 1774-1787, with John Hardman, (Voltaire Foundation, Oxford, December 1998)
- The Fall of the French Monarchy: Louis XVI, Marie Antoinette and the baron de Breteuil (Macmillan, 2002) won the Franco-British Society’s Enid McLeod Literary Prize. It was shortlisted for the Longman-History Today Prize, and the Hessell-Tiltman Prize.
  - It was published in the U.S. in 2003 with the title The Road from Versailles: Louis XVI, Marie Antoinette, and the Fall of the French Monarchy by St. Martin's Press.
  - It was published in Brazil in 2007 with the title A Queda da Monarquia Francesa. Luis XVI, Maria Antonieta et o barao de Breteuil. Editora Record, Rio de Janeiro.
- The Perilous Crown: Ruling France 1814-1848 (Macmillan, 2007) was well received in the UK, and France where it was published as Louis-Philippe, le prince et le roi : La France entre deux révolutions (Éditions de Fallois, 2009).
- The Road to Apocalypse: The Extraordinary Journey of Lewis Way (Notting Hill Editions, 2011) with Stanley Price. This book was shortlisted for the Jewish Quarterly-Wingate Prize.
- Napoleon The End Of Glory OUP, Oxford, 2014
  - It was published in Germany in 2015 with the title Napoleon. Der Untergang.
