= Clive Sinclair (author) =

British author (1948–2018)

Clive Sinclair FRSL
- Born: Clive John Sinclair; 19 February 1948; Hendon, London, UK
- Died: 5 March 2018 (aged 70); London
- Education: University of East Anglia (BA, PhD); University of California, Santa Cruz; University of Exeter
- Occupation: Writer
- Notable work: Hearts of Gold (1979); Bedbugs (1982); The Lady with the Laptop and Other Stories (1996)
- Awards: Somerset Maugham Award; Jewish Quarterly-Wingate Prize; Macmillan Silver Pen Award

Clive John Sinclair FRSL (19 February 1948 – 5 March 2018) was a British author who published several award-winning novels and collections of short stories, including Hearts of Gold (1979), Bedbugs (1982) and The Lady with the Laptop (1996).

== Biography ==
Sinclair, who was born into a Jewish family originally named Smolensky, grew up in Hendon, North London, and was educated at the University of East Anglia (BA, PhD), the University of California, Santa Cruz, and at the University of Exeter.

Although his writing career began with short stories that appeared in magazines and journals, his first book was a novel – Bibliosexuality – which was published in 1973 by Allison and Busby. As he said in a 2012 interview: "The truth is I've always been a short story writer rather than a novelist. Bibliosexuality was originally a collection of short stories about a certain David Drollkind. Margaret Busby said she would publish it, if I could find a way of linking them. That's how it became a novel."

Sinclair went on to become better known as a writer of short stories, with his next book, the 1981 collection Hearts of Gold, winning him the Somerset Maugham Award. In 1983, he was recognised in Granta′s list of Best Young British Novelists. He subsequently published several novels and collections of shorter fiction, in addition to non-fiction, such as biography and travel writing. His stories, interviews, travel pieces and reviews appeared in a wide range of publications, including Encounter, The Year’s Best Horror Stories, New Review, London Magazine, Penthouse, Club International, Transatlantic Review, Lilith, Monat, The Guardian, The Independent, Contrappasso Magazine. and The Times Literary Supplement (TLS).

Between 1983 and 1987, Sinclair was literary editor of The Jewish Chronicle, and in 1988 he was the British Council Guest Writer-in-residence at the University of Uppsala, Sweden. He had been the British Library Penguin Writer's Fellow, as well as a visiting lecturer, most frequently at the University of East Anglia (UEA), but also at the University of California, Santa Cruz, his special subjects being gothic fiction, creative writing, detective fiction, and Holocaust literature.

His other books include A Soap Opera From Hell: Essays on the Facts of Life and the Facts of Death (1998), Clive Sinclair's True Tales of the Wild West (2008), and Death & Texas (2014).

Sinclair was elected a fellow of the Royal Society of Literature in 1983.

Sinclair died in March 2018, aged 70. A posthumous collection of his work, entitled Shylock Must Die – based on the character Shylock in Shakespeare's The Merchant of Venice – was published in July 2018.

== Personal life ==
In 1979, Sinclair married Fran (née Redhouse), a special education teacher, with whom he had a son, Seth; she died at the age of 46. For the last 20 years of Sinclair's life his partner was artist Haidee Becker.

== Selected bibliography ==
- Bibliosexuality: A novel. London: Allison and Busby, 1973.
- Hearts of Gold (short stories). London: Allison and Busby, 1979.
- Bedbugs (short stories). London: Allison and Busby, 1982.
- The Brothers Singer (a biography of Isaac Bashevis Singer, I. J. Singer, and Esther Kreitman). London; Allison & Busby (distributed in the US by Schocken Books), 1983.
- Blood Libels (novel). London: Allison and Busby, 1985. New York: Farrar, Straus, Giroux, 1986.
- Cosmetic Effects (novel). London, 1991.
- Augustus Rex: A Novel. London: Andre Deutsch, 1992.
- The Lady with the Laptop and Other Stories. London: Picador, 1996.
- For Good or Evil: Collected Stories. London: Picador, 1998.
- A Soap Opera From Hell: Essays on the Facts of Life and the Facts of Death. London: Picador, 1998.
- Meet the Wife (novel). London: Picador, 2002.
- Clive Sinclair's True Tales of the Wild West (travel). London: Picador, 2008.
- Death & Texas (short stories). London: Halban Publishers, 2014.
- Shylock Must Die (short stories). London: Halban Publishers, 2018. ISBN 978-1905559947

== Awards ==
- 1981: Somerset Maugham Award (Hearts of Gold)
- 1997: Jewish Quarterly-Wingate Prize (The Lady with the Laptop and Other Stories)
- 1997: Macmillan Silver Pen Award (The Lady with the Laptop and Other Stories)
