= Hermann Simon (historian) =

German historian (born 1949)

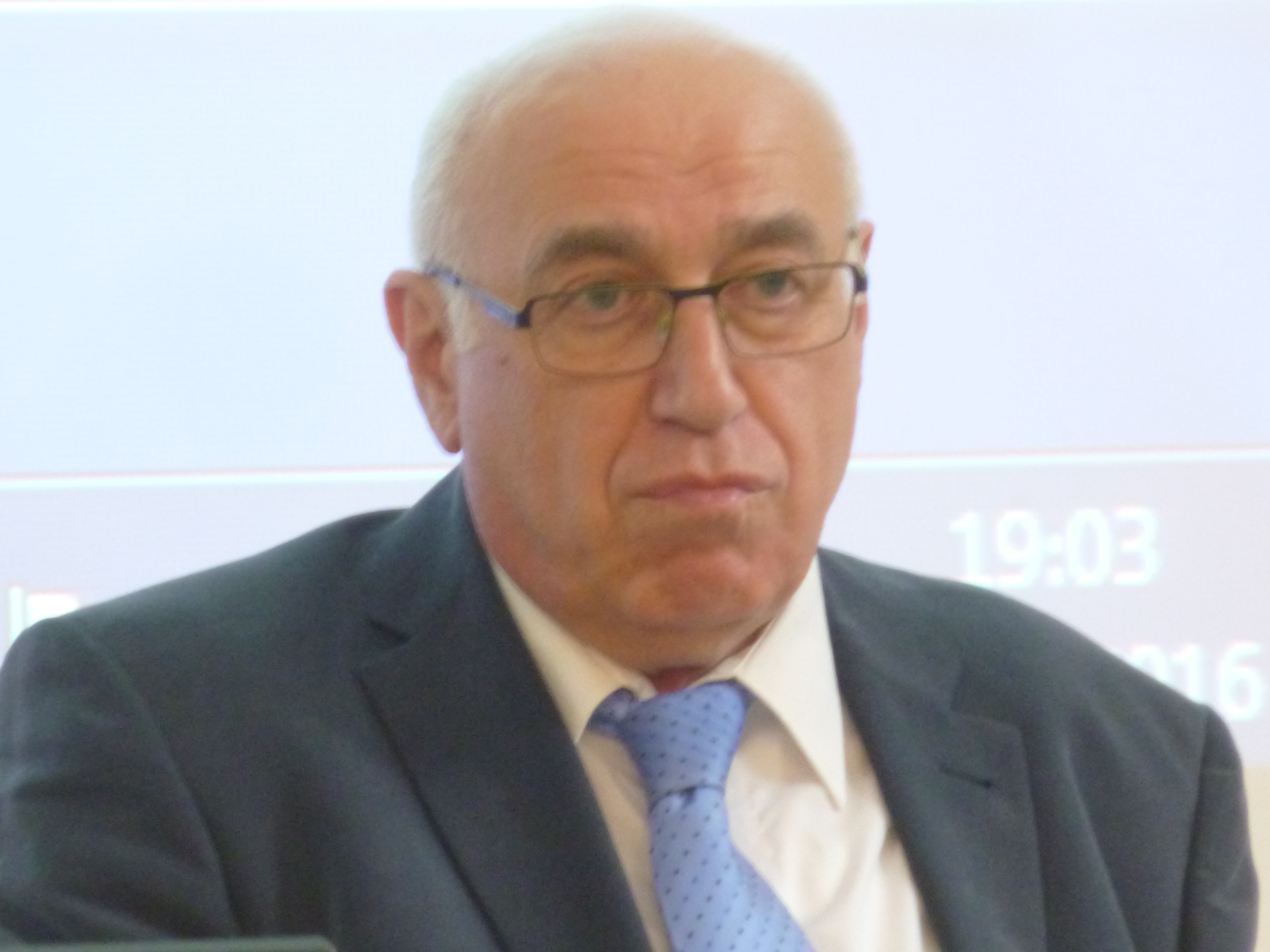

Hermann Simon (born 1949) is a German historian who was for 27 years director of the Foundation "New Synagogue Berlin - Centrum Judaicum".

== Early life ==
Hermann Simon was born in Berlin in 1949, the son of classical philologist and philosophy historian Marie Jalowicz-Simon and the judaist Heinrich Simon. Hermann Simon grew up in East Berlin. His family was a member of the Jewish Community East Berlin, which was very small because of the Holocaust and emigration in the postwar years. He studied History and Oriental Studies at the Humboldt University of Berlin, followed by graduate studies in Prague.

== Career ==
From 1975 to 1988 he worked at the Numismatic Collection of the National Museums in Berlin. In 1988 he was involved in the first exhibition about Jewish life in East Berlin (shown in Ephraim Palace).

Since the establishment of the New Synagogue Berlin - Centrum Judaicum in the same year he had been its director. On 1 September 2015, he handed over the reins to his successor Anja Siegemund. In 2015 Simon was awarded the Order of Merit of Berlin.

In the Berlin community, he is next to Andreas Nachama as representatives of the "liberal wing".

== Family ==
Hermann Simon is married to Deborah born Rix and lives with his family in Berlin.

== Selected publications ==
=== German ===
Hermann Simon beschäftigt sich in seinen zahlreichen Publikationen insbesondere mit Problemen der Geschichte der Juden in Deutschland. Er ist u. a. Herausgeber der Reihen "Jüdische Miniaturen", "Jüdische Memoiren" und der Schriftenreihe des Centrum Judaicum. Außerdem veröffentlichte er einige Artikel im Bereich Numismatik und Kataloge zu Berliner Ausstellungen.

- mit Irene Stratenwerth (Hrsg.): Pioniere in Celluloid. Henschel, Berlin 2004, ISBN 3-89487-471-6.
- Die Synagoge Rykestrasse, 1904–2004. "Neue Synagoge Berlin – Centrum Judaicum" Berlin / Verlag Hentrich & Hentrich, Teetz 2004, ISBN 3-933471-71-0 (= Jüdische Miniaturen, Band 17).
- mit Irene Stranwerth, Roland Hinrichs: Lemberg. Eine Reise nach Europa. Links, Berlin 2007, ISBN 978-3-86153-459-4 (Begleitband zur Ausstellung der Stiftung "Neue Synagoge Berlin – Centrum Judaicum": "Wo ist Lemberg?" vom 2. September bis zum 2. Dezember 2007).
- Jüdisches Berlin. Kultur-Karte: Museen, Gedenkstätten, Synagogen, Friedhöfe, Restaurants, Cafés, Shopping, Business , Mosse Verlag der Jüdischen Allgemeine, Berlin 2001, 2003, 2009, ISBN 3-935097-09-3 / ISBN 3-935097-01-8 (Jewish Berlin, englisch).
- mit Salomon Korn, Julian Nida-Rümelin u.a.: Jüdisches Museum Berlin. Sonderpublikation zur Eröffnung. Mosse Verlag der Jüdischen Allgemeine, Berlin 2001, ISBN 3-935097-06-9.
- mit Beate Meyer, Chana C. Schütz (Hrsg.): Juden in Berlin 1938–1945. Begleitband zur gleichnamigen Ausstellung in der Stiftung "Neue Synagoge Berlin – Centrum Judaicum", Philo Verlagsgesellschaft, Berlin 2000, ISBN 3-8257-0168-9.
- Die Neue Synagoge Berlin. Geschichte. Gegenwart. Zukunft, Edition Hentrich, Berlin 1991, ISBN 3-89468-014-8.
- Moses Mendelssohn. Gesetzestreuer Jude und deutscher Aufklärer. Herausgegeben von Centrum Judaicum, Verlag Hentrich & Hentrich, Berlin 2012, ISBN 978-3-942271-58-5 (= Jüdische Miniaturen, Band 1).
- mit Irene Stratenwerth und Marie Jalowicz Simon: Untergetaucht. Eine junge Frau überlebt in Berlin 1940–1945. Mit einem Nachwort von Hermann Simon. Fischer, Frankfurt am Main 2014, ISBN 978-3-10-036721-1 (die Geschichte seiner Mutter)
  - als Hörbuch: Nicolette Krebitz liest: Untergetaucht. Eine junge Frau überlebt in Berlin 1940–1945, mit Originaltonaufnahmen von Marie Jalowicz-Simon, bearbeitet von Irene Stratenwerth und Hermann Simon, Regie: Vera Teichmann. Lesefassung: Irene Stratenwerth, 7 CDs (8 Std. 16 Min.), Argon, Berlin 2014, ISBN 978-3-8398-1316-4.

=== English ===
- Jews in Berlin. Seemann Henschel, 2003. ISBN 9783894874261
- Jews in Nazi Berlin: From Kristallnacht to Liberation. University of Chicago Press, Chicago, 2009. (Editor with Beate Meyer & Chana Schütz) ISBN 9780226521572
