= Ayelet Gundar-Goshen =

Israeli author, psychologist and screenwriter

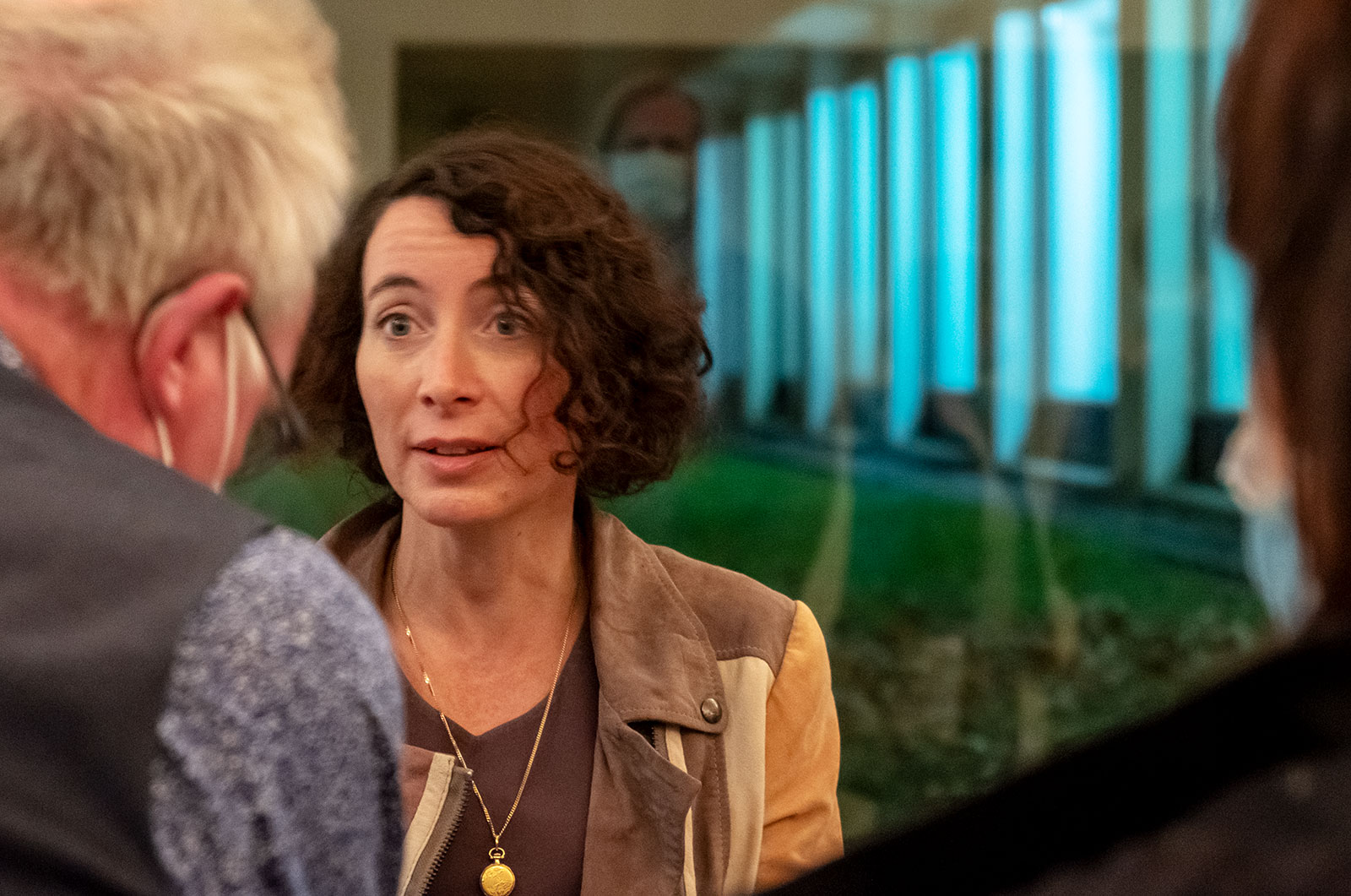
Ayelet Gundar-Goshen in 2021

Ayelet Gundar-Goshen (Hebrew: איילת גונדר-גושן; born 1982) is an Israeli clinical psychologist and author.

== Life ==
Ayelet Gundar-Goshen was born in Israel. She has a master's degree in psychology from Tel Aviv University. During her studies, she worked as a journalist and news editor in the leading Israeli news paper, Yedioth Ahronoth. She also studied screenplay in Sam Spiegel Film and Television School in Jerusalem. She is a clinical psychologist who also teaches at Tel Aviv University and the Holon Institute of Technology. She was a visiting author in San Francisco State University during 2018, and she is currently a visiting artist at University of California, Los Angeles.

== Writing ==
Gundar-Goshen writes screenplays for TV and cinema in Israel. One of her short scripts, Batman at the Checkpoint, won the Berlin Today Award for the best short film in 2012 on the Berlinale Talent Campus.

Her first novel, One Night, Markovitch (2012), won the Sapir Prize in 2013 for debut novels. The Hebrew novel was translated into thirteen languages. One Night, Markovitch won the Italian Adei-Wizo Prize (2016), which Gundar-Goshen shared with Etgar Keret, as well as the French Adei-Wizo Prize (2017). The novel was also long-listed for the Italian Sinbad Prize, and for Grand prix des lectrices de Elle.

Gundar-Goshen's second novel, Waking Lions (2014), was also translated into thirteen languages. It won the 2017 Jewish Quarterly-Wingate Prize, which Gundar-Goshen shared with Philippe Sands. The New York Times Book Review picked Waking Lions as an editors' choice, and The Wall Street Journal included the novel on its "Best Summer Reads" list. Mariella Frostrup picked Waking Lions as one of her Books of the Year 2016 in the Observer.

Gundar-Goshen is a contributor to BBC's the Cultural Frontline. She is also an occasional contributor to the Financial Times, Time and the Telegraph.

== Novels ==
  - Hebrew: לילה אחד, מרקוביץ', romanized: Layla ekhad, Markovitch.
    - One Night, Markovitch; London, Pushkin Press, 2015; new paperback edition: 2015; Toronto, Anansi, 2015.
  - Hebrew: להעיר אריות, romanized: Le-hair arayot.
    - Waking Lions; London, Pushkin Press, 2016; paperback: 2016; New York, Little, Brown.
  - Hebrew: השקרנית והעיר, romanized: Ha-Shakranit veha-Ir.
    - Liar, 2017.
  - Hebrew: רילוקיישן, romanized: Relocation.
    - The Wolf Hunt, 2021; New York, Little, Brown.
