= Louise London =

British writer (1947–2026)

- Born: 13 May 1947; Oxford, England
- Died: 26 February 2026 (aged 78)
- Education: University of London
- Occupation: Lawyer
- Writing career
- Language: English
- Notable work: Whitehall and the Jews, 1933-1948 (2000)

Louise Ann London (13 May 1947 – 26 February 2026) was a British writer, known for the book Whitehall and the Jews, 1933-1948: British Immigration Policy, Jewish Refugees and the Holocaust (2000), credited as a scholarly addition to the historical interest in Jewish immigration, and shortlisted for the Jewish Quarterly-Wingate Prize in 2001.

== Life and career ==
London was born in Oxford, England on 13 May 1947, to Jewish refugees, and qualified as a lawyer. Her book Whitehall and the Jews, 1933-1948, was based on her thesis completed in 1992 from the University of London. London died from cancer on 26 February 2026, at the age of 78.

== Selected publications ==
=== Books ===
- Whitehall and the Jews, 1933-1948: British Immigration Policy, Jewish Refugees and the Holocaust. Cambridge University Press. 2000. ISBN 0-521-53449-6.

=== Articles ===
- London, Louise Ann (1992). British immigration control procedures and Jewish refugees 1933-1942 (Thesis). Queen Mary University of London.
- London, Louise (1 June 1995). "Refugee Agencies and Their Work, 1933–39". The Journal of Holocaust Education. 4 (1): 3–17. doi:10.1080/17504902.1995.11102014. ISSN 1359-1371.
- London, Louise (1 July 2000). "Whitehall and the Refugees: The 1930s and the 1990s". Patterns of Prejudice. 34 (3): 17–26. doi:10.1080/00313220008559144. ISSN 0031-322X. S2CID 144698546.
