= Colin Holmes (historian) =

British author, scholar, and historian (born 1938)

Colin Holmes (born August 1938) is a British author, scholar, and historian. He retired in 1998 and is now an Emeritus Professor of History at the University of Sheffield.

== Early life and education ==
Holmes was brought up in South Normanton, Derbyshire, the son of a miner; his mother was in domestic service. He went to Tupton Hall Grammar School.

Holmes entered the University of Nottingham in 1957 on a scholarship, reading History. Coming under the influence of the lectures of J. D. Chambers, he applied to Alfred Wood for a transfer to Economic and Social History, which was granted. He wrote a third year dissertation on Chartism in Nottinghamshire. He then became a graduate student of Chambers, who assigned a topic, the life and work of H. S. Tremenheere, which he found uncongenial.

== Academic career ==
In 1963 Holmes was appointed to an assistant lectureship at the University of Sheffield in the Department of Economic and Social History under Sidney Pollard, then a rising star in the field of Economic History. During the 1970s the two worked closely together producing several volumes of documents covering European economic history in the modern period. Holmes jointly founded the journal Immigrants and Minorities in 1981 and served as joint editor until 2012. He currently serves on its advisory panel.

Following his appointment as assistant lecturer, Holmes later became lecturer (1965), senior lecturer (1972) and reader (1980) before being appointed to a personal professorship in the Department of History in 1989. Tony Kushner comments that the department, founded by Pollard in the 1960s, by the time he was a student there in the later 1970s and early 1980s, was "one largely of social and labour history", in which Holmes was a "key figure".

Holmes retired in 1998 and is now an emeritus professor of history in the university. During his career Holmes supervised many postgraduate students, who have been referred to as the "Sheffield School". The School has been defined in terms of the influence of Holmes and Richard Thurlow.

Following his retirement, in 2002 Holmes held a Parkes Fellowship at the University of Southampton. In 2018 at the Migration Museum, London he was presented with a Festschrift entitled Migrant Britain: Histories and Historiographies: Essays in Honour of Colin Holmes (Routledge Studies in Radical History and Politics) edited by Jennifer Craig-Norton, Christhard Hoffmann and Tony Kushner.

== Works ==
In collaboration with Pollard, Holmes wrote: The Process of Industrialization (1968); Industrial Power and National Rivalry (1972) and The End of the Old Europe (1973). Holmes and Pollard also edited Essays in the Economic and Social History of South Yorkshire (1977 reprinted 1979). Together with Alan Booth, in 1991 Holmes edited and contributed to a "festschrift" for Pollard called Economy and Society. European Industrialisation and its Social Consequences. On Pollard's death in 1988 Holmes became his literary executor and also edited for publication Pollard's Essays on the Industrial Revolution in Britain (2000).

Holmes is known for his work on British antisemitism, migration and fascism. In an edited volume, Immigrants and Minorities in British Society, he contributed an essay on "J.A.Hobson and the Jews". In 1979 Holmes wrote Anti-Semitism in British Society 1876–1939, which stimulated further research. He also wrote articles on the British editions of the Protocols of Zion.

In 1998 Holmes wrote John Bull's Island: Immigration & British Society, 1871–1971, on the history of migration. It focused on a wide range of groups that entered Britain in these years, their contributions to society and the responses they encountered. A related study, A Tolerant Country? Immigrants, Refugees and Minorities in Britain, appeared in 1991. He contributed "The Chinese Connection" in Outsiders and Outcasts. Essays in honour of William J Fishman (1983) which he edited jointly with Geoffrey Alderman. Migration in European History constituted two volumes of edited source material.

In 2017, together with Anne Kershen, Holmes edited An East End Legacy. Essays in Memory of William J. Fishman which was published by Routledge. He contributed on British Government Policy Towards War Time Refugees in M. Conway and J Gotovitch Europe in Exile. European Exile Communities in Britain, 1940–1945 (2001). In 2008 The Burton Book co-written by Geoffrey Alderman appeared in the Journal of the Royal Asiatic Society. In 2015 his chapter William Joyce and the German Connection appeared in Ian Wallace (ed.) Voices from Exile. His political biography of William Joyce: Searching for Lord Haw-Haw: The Political Lives of William Joyce was published by Routledge in 2016.

== Publications ==
=== Books ===
- The Process of Industrialization (London: Edward Arnold, 1968)
- Industrial Power and National Rivalry (London: Edward Arnold, 1972)
- The End of the Old Europe (London: Edward Arnold, 1973)
- Essays in the Economic and Social History of South Yorkshire (Barnsley, 1977 reprinted 1979)
- Immigrants and Minorities in British Society. London; Boston : Allen & Unwin, 1978. ISBN 978-0-04-942160-8
- Anti-Semitism in British Society: 1876–1939 (London: Edward Arnold, 1979) ISBN 978-0-71-316189-2
- John Bull's Island: Immigration and British Society, 1871–1971. Houndmills, Basingstoke, Hampshire : Macmillan, 1988. ISBN 978-0-333-28209-0
- Economy and Society. European Industrialisation and its Social Consequences (Leicester, 1991)
- A Tolerant Country?: Immigrants, Refugees, and Minorities in Britain London: Faber and Faber, 1991. ISBN 978-0-571-15426-5
- Outsiders and Outcasts. Essays in honour of William J. Fishman (London: Duckworth, 1993) pp. 214
- (with Sidney Pollard) Essays on the Industrial Revolution in Britain (Aldershot; Burlington, Vt.: Ashgate/Variorum, 2000) ISBN 978-0-86078-794-5
- Migration in European History. The International Library of Studies on Migration, (2 Vols., Cheltenham, UK: E. Elgar, 1996) ISBN 978-1-85898-421-6
- Searching for Lord Haw-Haw: The Political Lives of William Joyce (Abingdon, UK: Routledge, 2016)
- (with Anne Kershen) An East End Legacy. Essays in Memory of William J. Fishman (Abingdon, UK: Routledge, 2017)

== In media ==
=== Radio ===
- Holmes wrote and presented a 30-minute programme entitled Rosa Rust (BBC Radio 4), 15 August 1998.
