= The Prince of West End Avenue =

Novel by Alan Isler

The Prince of West End Avenue is the first novel by American novelist Alan Isler, published in 1994. The novel is a first-person narration by Otto Korner (formerly Körner) and intertwines a comedy about staging Hamlet in a Jewish retirement home, the Emma Lazarus, with flashbacks concerning the early life of the protagonist, his two marriages, the creation of Dada, and the Holocaust. It won the National Jewish Book Award and the JQ Wingate Prize and was also a finalist for the National Book Critics Circle Award in 1996.

Described by The New York Times as 'a paradoxical tale of how to make peace with an unbearable past and the sin of pride', the novel only reveals the tragic events haunting the narrator just before the end, lending perspective to the comic concerns of the staging of Hamlet.

== Characters ==
- Tuvye Bialkin: occupant of a penthouse room in the Emma Lazarus, who does not appear in the book;
- Freddy Blum: priapic resident of the Emma Lazarus;
- Dr Ralph Comyns: doctor at the Emma Lazarus;
- Magda Damrosch: Hungarian woman Körner meets on the train to Zurich in 1915 and pursues unsuccessfully; she later dies in Auschwitz;
- Mandy Dattner: new physical therapist at the Emma Lazarus who reminds Korner of Magda Damrosch; lover of Dr Comyns;
- Tosca Dawidowicz: resident at the Emma Lazarus;
- Morris (also 'Meurice') Gitlitz: first husband of Alice Krebs;
- Bruce Goldstein: proprietor of Goldstein's Dairy Restaurant on Broadway'
- Lorrie Grabscheidt: resident at the Emma Lazarus;
- Selma Gross: 'portress' at the Emma Lazarus; married to Bernie, a C.P.A who does not appear in the book;
- Benno Hamburger: friend of Korner and co-resident at the Emma Lazarus;
- Kenneth (né Kurt) Himmelfarb: brother-in-law of Otto Korner; married to Lola;
- Richard Huelsenbeck: part of the gang of Dada Nihilist in Zurich in the 1910s;
- Otto Korner (né Körner): former poet, retired librarian, narrator;
- Hugo Körner: son of Otto and Meta;
- Alice Krebs: aka 'The Contessa', Otto Korner's second wife;
- Gerhardt Kunstler: late addition to the residents at the Emma Lazarus; son of a man who worked for Körner's father in Berlin;
- Nahum Litschitz: resident at the Emma Lazarus; in favour of 'fart for fart's sake';
- Meta Infeld: Otto Körner's first wife;
- Hannah (also 'Hermione') Perlmutter: resident at the Emma Lazarus; lover of Benno Hamburger;
- Poliakov: aka The Red Dwarf; resident at the Emma Lazarus;
- Dr Hugo Weisskopf: director of the Emma Lazarus, also called the Kommandant and Dr Scheisskopf;
- Salo Wittkower: resident at the Emma Lazarus;

In addition, there are small parts played by Lenin, James Joyce, and Tristan Tzara.
