= Stanley Price (writer) =

British novelist and playwright (1931–2019)

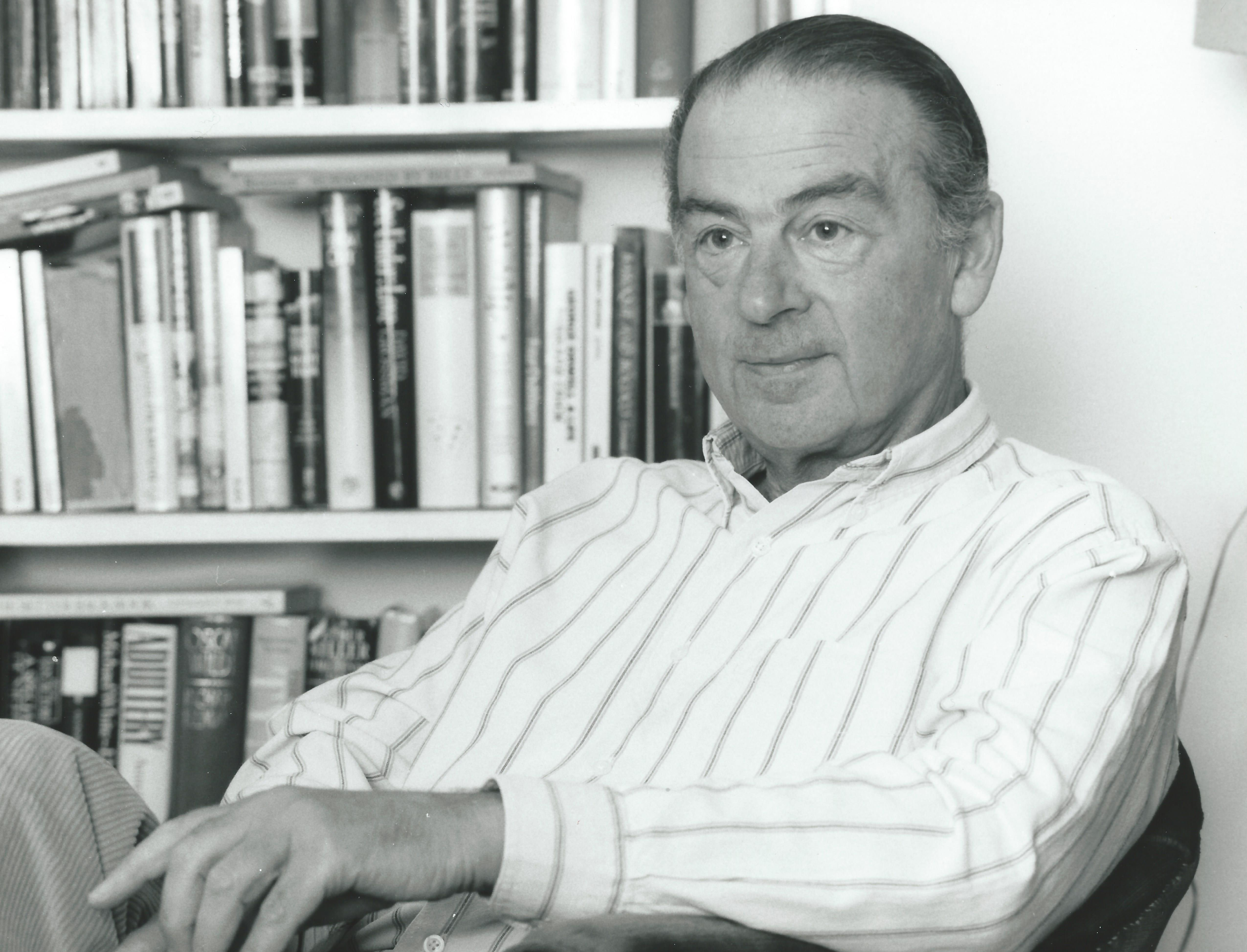
- Stanley Price
- Born: 12 August 1931; London, England
- Died: 28 February 2019 (aged 87); London, England
- Occupations: Novelist, playwright and biographer
- Spouse: Judy Fenton (m. 1957)
- Children: Munro Price

Stanley Price (12 August 1931 – 28 February 2019) was a British novelist and playwright who wrote for the theatre, film, and television from the 1960s.

== Biography ==
Price was born in Stamford Hill, London on 12 August 1931. His father, Morris (Jim) Price was an Irish Jewish GP, and his mother was Gertrude "Gyp" Price (née White). Although born in England, Price considered himself to be Irish. He was educated in Dublin at Wesley College, in London, and in Cambridge at the Perse School.

He did National Service in the Army before going to Gonville and Caius College, Cambridge, to read history. He started his career as a journalist, working as a reporter on Life magazine in New York from 1957 to 1960. In 1960 he returned to London where he contributed to numerous papers and magazines.

His first novel, Crusading for Kronk, was published in 1960 by Gollancz in the UK This was followed by A World of Difference (Michael Joseph 1961), Just for the Record (Michael Joseph, 1962) and The Biggest Picture (Michael Joseph, 1964). All four were published in the U.S. and the UK, and the last two in paperback by Penguin.

When Price found that he was enjoying writing the dialogue in his novels more than the descriptions that linked them, he turned to writing plays. In 1967 his first play, Horizontal Hold, was produced by Binkie Beaumont of H. M. Tennant and had a short, but happy life in the West End at the Comedy Theatre. His next play, The Starving Rich, a comedy set in a health clinic, never found a London home, but had two UK tours, and subsequently had many international productions. In Germany, retitled Ein Yoghurt fur Zwei, it ran in repertory in certain regional theatres for over fifteen years, and became known as 'The Mousetrap of Mannheim'. In 1982, Price returned to the West End with Moving which had a successful run with Penelope Keith, who later starred in the television series of the play. In 1986, Why Me?, a black comedy about executive unemployment, ran at the Strand Theatre with a much-acclaimed performance by Richard Briers.

Price also wrote and edited many film screenplays. These include co-writer credits on Arabesque, 1967 (Sophie Loren and Gregory Peck), Gold, 1974 (Roger Moore and Susannah York), Shout at the Devil, 1976 (Roger Moore and Lee Marvin). More recently, his original screenplays and adaptations have been written principally for television, several of them winning international awards, including, in 1996, the American cable television's Ace Award for best screenplay for Genghis Cohn (after the book by Romain Gary). This also won the best screenplay award at the Rheims International Television Festival in 1995. Close Relations had also won this award in 1991.

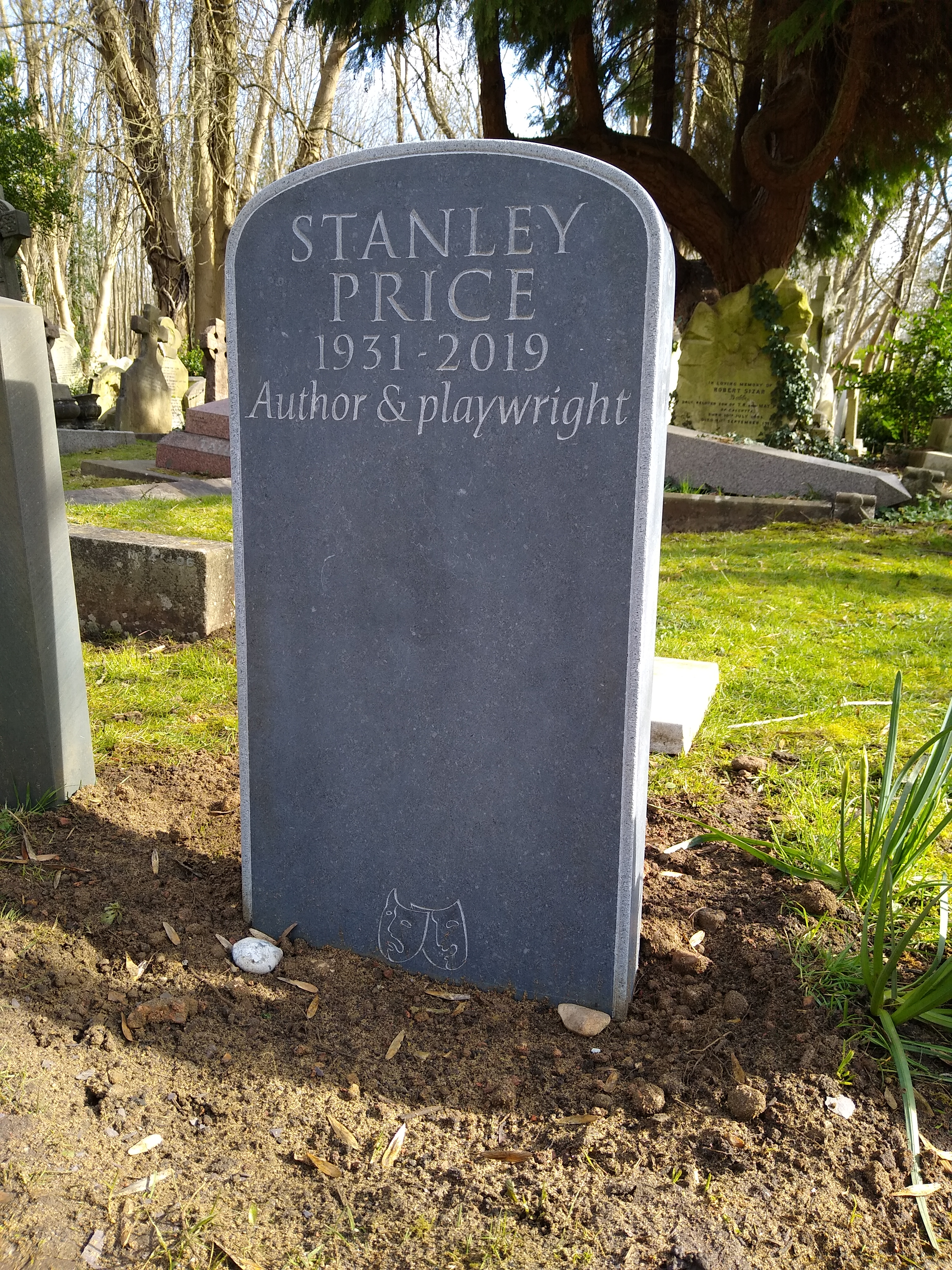
Stanley Price's grave at Highgate Cemetery

Price died on 28 February 2019 at age 87 and was buried on the east side of Highgate Cemetery. Munro Price is his son.

== Plays ==
- Why Me?, Strand Theatre, 1986–87.
- Moving, Queen's Theatre, London, 1982–83.
- The Two of Me, Jeanetta Cochrane Theatre, 1975.
- The Starving Rich (aka Ein Joghurt für zwei).
- Horizontal Hold, Comedy Theatre, 1967

== Television screenplays ==
- All Things Being Equal, ITV, 1970.
- Horizontal Hold, ITV, 1971.
- Moving, ITV, 1985.
- Close Relations, BBC2, 1990.
- Genghis Cohn, BBC2, 1995
- Star Quality, BBC2 1997.(adapted from Noël Coward short stories)
- A Royal Scandal. BBC2 2002.
- Somewhere to Hang My Hat. Channel 4 and RTÉ, 2004.

== Novels ==
- The Biggest Picture, Michael Joseph, 1966.
- Me for Posterity, Vanguard, 1965.
- Just for the Record, Michael Joseph (Penguin), 1964.
- A World of Difference, Michael Joseph (Penguin), 1963.
- Crusading for Kronk, Gollancz/Putnam's. U.S., 1961.

== Non-fiction ==
- Somewhere to Hang My Hat: An Irish Jewish Journey (New Island Books, 2003) (Short-listed for Jewish Quarterly-Wingate Prize, 2004)
- The Road to Apocalypse: The Extraordinary Journey of Lewis Way. With Munro Price. (Notting Hill Editions. 2012) (Short-listed for Jewish Quarterly-Wingate Prize, 2013)
- James Joyce and Italo Svevo—The Story of a Friendship. (Somerville Press & Peter Owen. 2016)

Stanley Price was also a frequent contributor to The Oldie.
