= Linda Grant =

English novelist and journalist

Linda Grant FRSL
- Born: 15 February 1951 (age 75); Liverpool, England
- Education: Simon Fraser, McMaster and York
- Occupation: Novelist
- Writing career
- Notable works: Remind Me Who I Am Again; When I Lived in Modern Times; The Clothes on Their Backs
- Website: lindagrant.co.uk

Linda Grant FRSL (born 15 February 1951) is an English novelist and journalist.

== Early life ==
Linda Grant was born in Liverpool. She was the oldest child of Benny Ginsberg, a businessman who made and sold hairdressing products, and Rose Haft; both parents had immigrant backgrounds – Benny's family was Polish-Jewish, Rose's Russian-Jewish – and they adopted the surname Grant in the early 1950s.

She was educated at The Belvedere School, studied English at the University of York (1972 to 1975), then completed an M.A. in English at McMaster University in Canada. She did post-graduate studies at Simon Fraser University.

== Career ==
In 1985, Grant returned to England and became a journalist, working for The Guardian, and eventually wrote her own column for eighteen months. She published her first book, a non-fiction work, Sexing the Millennium: A Political History of the Sexual Revolution, in 1993. She wrote a personal memoir of her mother's fight with vascular dementia called Remind Me Who I Am, Again, which was cited in a discussion about ageing on BBC Radio 4's Thinking Allowed in December 2003.

Her fiction draws heavily on her Jewish background, family history, and the history of Liverpool. In an interview by Emma Parker for the University of Leicester's July 2008 'Unsettling Women: Contemporary Women's Writing and Diaspora' conference, and later published in the journal Wasafiri, Grant said:

I always wanted to make my living as a writer, but you couldn’t get a job as an author, so I got a job as a reporter on a local paper just before my eighteenth birthday. I always knew that sooner or later I would write fiction, although I didn’t realise it would be as late as it was. I didn’t write a novel until after the age of forty because it took me a long time to find a fictional voice, which was to do with being Jewish. […] I had been trying different voices and found none adequate. I felt that there were two modes open to me. One was to have a voice like Howard Jacobson, which is absolutely embedded within a recognisable Jewish community, but I was from a community which was not recognised as Jewish. People say, ‘Oh, I never knew that there were any Jews in Liverpool’. Also, growing up in a middle-class family made me marginal to the Liverpool voice, which had always been working-class or Irish. And then there was the generalised middle-class English voice, which always felt to me like ventriloquism. And I didn’t feel that I could write like an American Jewish author such as Philip Roth, who shows how Jewish Americans, like Irish Americans and Italian Americans, have contributed to American national identity, because by the time the Jews arrived here, British national identity had already been formed. And that’s why my first novel, The Cast Iron Shore, is about somebody who feels marginal. It was only when I started writing about people who are marginal, who have problematic identities and problems with belonging, that I found my voice.

Grant's choices of her favourite pieces of classical music were broadcast as part of BBC Radio 3's Saturday Classics in June 2012.

In November 2016, The Guardian published a detailed account of Grant's writing process, in which she noted, "My rituals of writing are so calcified I could be an elderly colonel at his gentleman's club: ironed newspaper, tea piping hot, shoes the correct colour for in town. Without the scaffolding of my habits, I'm superstitiously convinced I'd never write a word. I don't – can't – write after lunch, in a cafe or any other public place, including trains and planes, or when anyone else is in the house. It's an act of severe, intense solitude, partly now destroyed by the internet, and its deceptive promise of the ease of looking things up as you go along."

== Bibliography ==
=== Non-fiction ===
- Sexing the Millennium: A Political History of the Sexual Revolution. London: HarperCollins, 1993.
- Remind Me Who I Am, Again. London: Granta Books, 1998.
- The People on the Street: A Writer's View of Israel. London: Virago Press, 2006.
- The Thoughtful Dresser. London: Virago Press, 2009.

=== Fiction ===
- The Cast Iron Shore. London: Granta Books, 1995.
- When I Lived in Modern Times. London: Granta Books, 2000.
- Still Here. London: Little Brown May, 2002.
- The Clothes on Their Backs. London: Virago Press, 2008.
- We Had It So Good. London: Virago Press, 2011
- Upstairs at the Party. London: Virago Press, 2014
- The Dark Circle. London: Virago Press, 2016
- A Stranger City. London: Virago Press, 2019
- The Story of the Forest. London: Virago Press, 2023.

== Awards ==
Grant's début novel, The Cast Iron Shore, won the David Higham Prize for Fiction in 1996; awarded to the best first novel of the year. Three years later her second, non-fiction, work, Remind Me Who I Am Again, won both the Mind and Age Concern Book of the Year awards.

Her second fictional novel, When I Lived in Modern Times won the 2000 Orange Prize for Fiction and was short-listed for the Jewish Quarterly-Wingate Literary Prize the same year. In 2002 her third novel Still Here was long-listed for the Man Booker Prize.

In 2006, Grant won the First Prize Lettre Ulysses Award for the "Art of Reportage", the last to be awarded, for her non-fiction work about the Israeli people entitled The People on the Street: A Writer's View of Israel. The Clothes on Their Backs was short-listed for the Man Booker Prize in 2008 and won The South Bank Show award in the Literature category. It was also long-listed for the Orange Prize for Fiction in the same year.

In 2014, Grant was appointed a Fellow of the Royal Society of Literature (FRSL).

In March 2017, it was announced that Grant's novel The Dark Circle had been longlisted for the Baileys Women's Prize for Fiction.
