= Alan Isler =

American novelist and professor

Alan Isler (September 12, 1934 – March 29, 2010) was an English-American novelist and professor. He left his native England for the United States at age 18, served in the US Army from 1954 to 1956, received a doctorate in English Literature from Columbia University and taught Renaissance Literature at Queens College, City University of New York from 1967 to 1995. In 1994 he won the National Jewish Book Award and the JQ Wingate Prize for his first novel “The Prince of West End Avenue”, which was also a finalist for the National Book Critics Circle Award. He has subsequently published four other works: “Kraven Images” (1996); “The Bacon Fancier”, also known as “Op.Non.Cit.”, (1999); “Clerical Errors” (2002); and “The Living Proof” (2005).

His writing has been described as dense but comical, referential and intellectual in the tradition of Nabokov, and is often concerned with the condition of the solitary Jew in a Gentile world.

Alan Isler died after a long illness on March 29, 2010.

== Works ==
- The Prince Of West End Avenue 1994, a comedy set in a New York Jewish old persons' home, and centred on the retirees’ preparations for their upcoming production of Hamlet.
- Kraven Images 1996, partly a hilarious sixties-style sex-romp set in a Bronx College, and partly a mad but mournful attempt to resolve the past in London and Yorkshire.
- The Bacon Fancier, also published as Op. Non. Cit. 1999, four satirical tales wrought from the sideshows of literature.
- Clerical Errors 2002, in which the peregrinations of a Jewish Catholic priest give rise to a fierce yet tender lampoon of Catholicism. German translation "Klerikale Irrtümer", Random House - Berlin Verlag, Berlin 2002, Printed by Friedrich Pustet Verlag Regensburg
- The Living Proof 2005, a famous and anti-Semitic painter hires a Jewish biographer.
