= Elisabeth Russell Taylor =

English writer (1930–2020)

- Born: 14 May 1930; London, England
- Died: 1 September 2020 (aged 90)
- Occupations: Antiques dealer, broadcaster, writer
- Spouses: Freddie Silberman; Russell Taylor; Tom Fairs
- Children: 1
- Writing career
- Genres: Novels, nonfiction, short stories, children's books
- Notable works: Tomorrow, I is Another

Elisabeth Russell Taylor (née Lewsen; 14 May 1930 – 1 September 2020) was an English writer of novels, short stories, nonfiction and children's books. Critics acclaimed her "brilliant, dark and unsettling" work, describing it as "mingling the elegant with the grotesque."

== Personal life ==
She was born in London to parents Sidney Lewsen and Peggy Davidson. As a girl she studied at the Francis Holland School and the Garden School in West Wycombe.

Her first marriage to Freddie Silberman, with whom she had her only child, Jonathan, was brief. Her second marriage to Russell Taylor began in 1957, and in 1962 she left him for artist Tom Fairs, whom she eventually married in 1987. She began to write during her second marriage.

She lived in Belsize Park.

== Partial bibliography ==
Nonfiction:

- Wish You Were Here (1976)
- London Lifelines (1977)
- The Potted Garden (1980)
- Marcel Proust and His Contexts: A Critical Biography of English-Language Scholarship (1981) (One review said, "Obviously fascinated by Proust and his contexts, Taylor seems to have embarked on an extensive reading expedition; the result shows the peripeties of an itinerary not exactly prescribed by academic guidelines—rather an individualistic tour which led to a wealth of personal discoveries.")
- The Diabetic Cookbook (1981)

Novels:

- Swann Song (1988)
- Divide and Rule (1989)
- Tomorrow (1991) (The Publishers Weekly review said, "Taylor's terse, clear prose is always readable, but she is so parsimonious in doling out information about her characters that the tear-jerking climax doesn't have the devastating effect she seems to have intended.")
- Pillion Riders (1993)
- I is Another (1995)
- Present Fears (1997)

Short story collections:

- Present Fears (1997)
- Will Dolores Come to Tea? (2000, shortlisted for the Jewish Quarterly-Wingate Prize)
- Belated and Other Stories (2014)

Children's books:

- The Gifts of the Tarns (1977)
- Tales from Barleyhill (1978)
- The Loadstone (1978)
- Turkey in the Middle (1983)
