= Marie Jalowicz-Simon =

German scholar and historian (1922–1998)

Marie Jalowicz (4 April 1922 – 16 September 1998) was a German philologist and historian of philosophy. She became known to larger audiences for her autobiographical account of the persecution of Jews in Nazi Germany, which was published posthumously.

== Early life ==
Jalowicz was born Jewish in Berlin, Germany. When she was 11 the Nazi Party came to power and began to imprison her family members. By age 20, she was forced to fend for herself. She survived by assimilating into German life, pretending to be a non-Jew. She died in Berlin. Her mother died of cancer in 1938. Her father died in 1941. She is survived by her only son, Hermann Simon.

== Holocaust and survival ==
Just before her death in 1998 she recorded 77 cassette tapes of audio with her son, Hermann, for the first time chronicling her experience during the Nazi reign. They were later compiled into a book: Underground in Berlin: A Young Woman's Extraordinary Tale of Survival in the Heart of Nazi Germany. Jalowicz was a forced labourer at the Siemens arms factory in Berlin, but left after the death of her father (a sympathetic supervisor fired her, as forced labourers were not allowed to resign). In 1941, a postman tried to deliver a letter from the job centre and Jalowicz told him her "neighbour", Marie Jalowicz, had been deported. This allowed her to vanish from the records and become "submerged".

She relocated multiple times over the next four years and at one stage was sold to an abusive Nazi with late-stage syphilis for 15 marks, which added to her cover as a non-Jew.

Marie managed to escape the hands of the Nazis through the use of forged documentation, impersonation, and help from several people. She moved around often and relied on her connections to get help. She was guided by the advice of a friend who said, “Absurd times demand absurd measures. We have to save ourselves using absurd methods since the Nazis have set out to kill us all. She tried to flee Germany but returned home each time she tried.

She returned to her original identity only on her deathbed, and pursued a career in academia, receiving a Ph.D. in ancient literature and art history at Berlin's Humboldt University.
