= When I Lived in Modern Times =

Novel by Linda Grant

- Book cover
- Author: Linda Grant
- Language: English
- Genre: Historical fiction
- Published: 2000
- Publisher: Granta Books
- Publication place: United Kingdom
- Media type: Print
- Awards: Winner of Orange Prize for Fiction 2000
- ISBN: 978-1-8620-7334-0
- OCLC: 43069243
- Dewey Decimal: 823.914

When I Lived in Modern Times is a novel by Linda Grant. It won the Orange Prize for Fiction in 2000. Following being awarded the Orange Prize, there were accusations of plagiarism leveled against the author. The accusations were claimed to be unfounded as the tracts indicated had been referenced, and agreed to be used, by the original publisher.

== Plot summary ==
The novel follows the story of a young Jewish woman from London who emigrates to the future Israel in 1946 and lives through the birth of the nation. She spends time in a kibbutz and then moves to Tel Aviv.
