= The Dark Circle =

2016 novel by Linda Grant

- Author: Linda Grant
- Language: English
- Publisher: Virago
- Publication date: 3 November 2016
- Publication place: United Kingdom
- Media type: Print (Hardcover)
- Pages: 320 pages
- ISBN: 978-034-900675-8

The Dark Circle is the seventh novel by English novelist and journalist Linda Grant. Published in November 2016, it tells the story of tubercular east London twins, Lenny and Miriam Lynskey, sent to convalesce in a post-World War II sanitorium in Kent shortly after the formation of the National Health Service (NHS). The Dark Circle was shortlisted for the Baileys Women's Prize for Fiction in May 2017.

== Plot summary ==
Eighteen-year-old twins Lenny and Miriam Lynskey initially enjoy life in post-World War II London, having spent an austere period in Wales as refugees. Lenny plans to become involved in the criminal world of their Uncle Manny, a former black-marketeer who is now attempting to build a more legitimate property empire, whilst Miriam has gained employment in a respectable florist's shop in Mayfair. When Lenny is conscripted for national service, Uncle Manny pays a bribe to ensure that his nephew is rejected on medical grounds. However, the military's tests reveal that Lenny genuinely has tuberculosis and shortly afterwards Miriam is found to also have the disease.

They are both sent to the Gwendolyn Downie Memorial Hospital, known colloquially as the Gwendo, a recently built sanatorium in rural Kent where they are the institution's first Jewish patients. Whereas such institutions previously only served well-to-do private patients, the recent advent of the NHS means that a wider section of British society is treated there for free. An additional bonus for the twins is that food for the patients is unrationed, unlike in the rest of post-war Britain.

However, Miriam and Lenny are rebellious patients from the outset, not least after they hear rumours of a miracle cure, streptomycin, which promises an alternative to the Gwendo's harsh surgical and cold air remedies. They are aided in their defiance by fellow resident Arthur Persky, a merchant seaman from the United States, with whom Miriam falls in love. Miriam and Lenny both form a friendship with another patient, Valerie, who uses her Oxford University learning to help educate them. Miriam is rendered deaf as a result of the side-effects of Persky injecting her with a batch of streptomycin stolen at the behest of Uncle Manny. The Gwendo is shut down shortly afterwards, following an unrelated government inspection.

Persky attempts to meet Miriam in Spain – where she is holidaying with Lenny, Valerie and other friends – but is caught stealing her a Paris gown belonging to a passenger of the cruise liner he is working on, and he is detained on board and returned to the US.

In later life, Lenny has forged a successful media career and married Valerie. Despite Miriam's deafness he calls her by telephone every day for over sixty years, on the basis that "As long as I hear her breathing at the other end, I know not to worry". Lenny and Valerie retire to the Côte d'Azur, where Miriam joins her brother after the death of his wife.

== Critical reception ==
Writing in the London Evening Standard, Rosamund Irwin stated, "A Grant novel is always a treat — packed with 'I wish I had said that' observations — but The Dark Circle feels personal to me. Both my father's father and my mother's mother had TB", before adding, "Grant meticulously conveys the horrors of the disease". Irwin went on to find that, "For a novel set amid such sterility, The Dark Circle is remarkably lively and well-paced. My one tiny niggle is the beginning, where Miriam implausibly rescues Lenny, who has thrown a sandwich at the fascist Jeffrey Hamm". She concluded by saying, "Grant captures the stigma that surrounded TB perfectly. […] With the rise of multi-drug-resistant TB, the white plague hasn’t quite left us. The Dark Circle shows us why it was once so feared."

The Jewish Chronicle's Bryan Cheyette observed, "The more mature Grant becomes as a novelist, the smaller her canvas. Not that Grant's concerns are in any way trifling. Her cast of characters is nothing less than a portrayal of post-war, class-riven Britain from the indolent aristocracy, to Oxford-educated blue stockings, and from car salesmen to the bottom of the pile, German émigrés and East End Jewish lowlifes." Overall, he decided that, "Grant writes well about illness as all who have read Remind Me Who I Am, Again can testify. This is a novel, above all, about trauma caused by the 'dark circle' of tuberculosis, and results in a 'tight circle' of comradeship. The ambitious reach of the novel is wisely held in check by its focus on a time when Lenny and Miriam had to discover for themselves what it was to be human."

In UK daily newspaper The Guardian, Christobel Kent called the book "Linda Grant’s exhilaratingly good new novel", adding that, "From Dickens to Camus to Solzhenitsyn, disease and cure (along with their institutions and instruments) have been so well used as metaphors that careful handling by Grant of the enclosed world of the sanatorium is imperative, if it is not to seem stale. But she is far too subtle a novelist to miss this, and from the outset The Dark Circle dispels such anxieties. This is a novel whose engine is flesh and blood, not cold ideas: my single quibble is about the use of such a gloomy title for a book so drenched in colour and light." He found Grant to be "pervasively intelligent, but she does not intellectualise: there is a marvellous supple instinctiveness to her physical descriptions", concluding that, "It is the deeply involving physical reality of the Lynskeys’ confinement that draws us in effortlessly to the narrative [...] Grant brings the 1950s – that odd, downbeat, fertile decade between war and sexual liberation – into sharp, bright, heartbreaking focus."

For The Observer, Hannah Beckerman found the book to be "a fascinating portrayal of the authoritarianism inherent in postwar British healthcare. Some of the treatments are both brutal and unproved, yet there is a dictatorial assumption that doctors’ orders should never be questioned. [...] Despite its historical setting, Grant's novel is shot through with contemporary relevance." Despite judging that, "Occasionally, the novel wears its social history too conspicuously on its sleeve: references to the early years of TV, issues with the middle classes, housing developments and debates about the NHS can at times feel pointed and do not fit entirely seamlessly with the narrative", Beckerman ended by writing, "But The Dark Circle is nonetheless a revealing insight: both funny and illuminating, it is a novel about what it means to treat people well, medically, emotionally and politically".

On 12 November 2016, the book was critically discussed on BBC Radio 4's Saturday Review.

== Awards ==
In March 2017, it was announced that The Dark Circle had been longlisted for the Baileys Women's Prize for Fiction. It was shortlisted in May of the same year.
