= Final Solution (Cesarani book) =

2016 nonfiction book

- First edition
- Author: David Cesarani
- Language: English
- Genre: Non-fiction
- Publisher: Macmillan
- Publication date: 2016

Final Solution: The Fate of the Jews 1933–1949 is a 2016 non-fiction book by David Cesarani.

In The Daily Telegraph Sarah Helm stated that the book is "demonstrating with urgency and verve how Hitler’s progress towards mass extermination of the Jews was never pre-planned or preordained." Instead, according to Helm, the book demonstrates that "improvisation and chance" were crucial to the Holocaust. Helm added that the book shows that people who collaborated with the Nazis did much of the work in the Holocaust rather than the Nazis themselves, and it also "challenges the widely held view that the extermination of the Jews was ever Hitler’s first priority."

In The New York Times Nicholas Stargardt stated that "Cesarani finally wrote the book he had turned away from writing 15 years earlier."

== Contents ==
In one part of the book Cesarani argues that the word "Holocaust" is faulty and suggests ending the use of the term. Cesarani argues that the term and others like genocide cause the public to treat the mass killings as being separate from the events that caused them.

Helm adds that the book's author "barely mentions the non-Jewish victims, holding fast to his own preconceived notion" of the Jewish and non-Jewish death campaigns being distinct.

Stargardt wrote that the book uses "a timbre that is clear and somber, the voice of classical realism".

Jack Fischel of the Jewish Book Council stated that Cesarani's thesis does not take into account how plans to deport Jews to Madagascar and alternate plans prior to the finalizing of the Holocaust would have killed Jews anyway.

Nick Fraser of The Guardian stated that "This is a book as hard to read as a set of Human Rights Watch reports."

== Reception ==
Helm gave the book five stars, writing that it is "the most authoritative and urgent voice to present" the Holocaust as not having been planned beforehand.

Fraser wrote that "I don’t think he’s wholly successful, but this isn’t really a criticism because, without the empathetic inspiration of art, it may be impossible truly to understand what happened."
