= The Jewish Quarterly =

International Jewish journal

The Jewish Quarterly is an international Jewish publication that was based in the UK publication until 2021; the journal is now published by Australian publisher Morry Schwartz, With four issues released a year, The Jewish Quarterly focuses on issues of Jewish concern, but also has interests in wider culture and politics.

== History and profile ==
The Jewish Quarterly was founded by Jacob Sonntag in 1953 and was published in the UK, through to its hiatus in 2019. In 2021, the publication was relaunched by Australian publisher, Morry Schwartz, for international distribution. The current editor is Jonathan Pearlman, who also edits Australian Foreign Affairs for Schwartz Media. Previous editors have included Matthew Reisz, Elena Lappin and Rachel Shabi.

In 1974, Sonntag described The Jewish Quarterly:

If I were asked how I envisaged The Jewish Quarterly when I started it more than twenty years ago, I would say that it was to cultivate literary journalism in the best tradition of Central and Eastern Europe and, in particular, in the best tradition of Eastern European Jewish writing ... I belong to the generation which looked for a synthesis between our Jewishness and our Europeanism, between our nationalism and our socialism, between the particular and the universal ... Part of our upbringing was to revere the printed word, to adorn it with a power of its own. How could truth and reason not prevail'? It was just a question of finding the right word, the right combination of words, and everything else would follow from it. Literature was a living thing for us, and the world of books knew no boundaries. We cherished the illusion that 'you have only to will it and your dreams would cease to be fairy tales' ... We felt as a collective, we had a sense of community, we felt called upon to add a link to the 'golden chain', handed to us by an earlier generation.

— Jacob Sonntag
