= David Cesarani =

British historian (1956-2015)

David Cesarani OBE
- Born: 13 November 1956; London, United Kingdom
- Died: 25 October 2015 (aged 58)
- Awards: Officer of the Order of the British Empire

Academic background
- Education: Latymer Upper School
- Alma mater: University of Cambridge; Columbia University; University of Oxford

Academic work
- Institutions: University of Leeds Royal Holloway University Queen Mary University of London Wiener Library
- Doctoral students: Katarzyna Person
- Main interests: Jewish history

David Ian Cesarani OBE (13 November 1956 – 25 October 2015) was a British historian who specialised in Jewish history, especially the Holocaust. He also wrote several biographies, including Arthur Koestler: The Homeless Mind (1998).

== Academic career ==
Cesarani held positions at the University of Leeds, at Queen Mary University of London, and at the Wiener Library in London, where he was director for two periods in the 1990s. He was professor of Modern Jewish history at the University of Southampton from 2000 to 2004 and research professor in history at Royal Holloway, University of London from 2004 until his death. Here he helped establish and direct the Holocaust Research Centre.

== Adolf Eichmann and critiquing Arendt's "banality of evil" thesis ==
In 2005, he published Eichmann: His Life and Crimes, a biography of Nazi official Adolf Eichmann. It featured previously unused primary source material, including Eichmann's reports and speeches dating from 1937 in which he describes his beliefs in a Jewish conspiracy. The book aimed to dispel Hannah Arendt's "banality of evil" thesis regarding Eichmann in which Eichmann is described as a bureaucrat far removed from brutalities of the Holocaust, following orders instead of advancing ideology. Cesarani's account rejects this outline, detailing Eichmann's attachment to Nazi ideology. Cesarani argues that Arendt's account of the Eichmann trial was hindered by her prejudice towards the Eastern European Jewish background of the prosecutor, Gideon Hausner.

British historian Ian Kershaw wrote in his Daily Telegraph that he commended Cesarani's "expert guidance through the web of lies, deceit, and contradictions built into Eichmann's various tendentious accounts of his life and career". Kershaw says that Cesarani's "revision of Arendt's interpretation is surely correct" in arguing that "Eichmann was a convinced anti-Semitic ideologue in a key position where he himself could initiate action and make things happen" rather than a bureaucrat accepting orders.

New York Times Book Review editor Barry Gewen praises the book, suggesting that "there may never be need for another biography of [Eichmann]" on account of the book's "factual density". Though very detailed, Gewen questions to what extent this new narrative is opposed to Arendt's. The key question, for Gewen, is whether Cesarani succeeds in demonstrating something new about the nature of Eichmann's antisemitism. Cesarani adds useful context regarding the anti-Jewish north-Austrian milieu in which Eichmann was raised, but Gewen doubts that this expands understanding of Eichmann as an individual. On why Eichmann first joined the Nazi party in 1932, Arendt says Eichmann was motivated by his personal tendencies as a joiner, while Cesarani highlights his political affection for Nazi position on the Treaty of Versailles, but both agree that antisemitism was not a large factor. The two agree on many factual details regarding Eichmann's rise in the Nazi ranks through 1941, but disagree about the psychological factors in play, which Gewen does not wish to sort out. In conclusions, too, Gewen suggests that the two agree that normal people can become monsters under the correct (or incorrect) circumstances.

Gewen dismissed what he described as Cesarani's "hostility" to Arendt and suggested that Cesarani needed to "tear Arendt down to make space for himself." He further said that "Cesarani believes his details add up to a portrait at odds with Arendt's banal bureaucrat, but what is striking is how far his research goes to reinforce her fundamental arguments." He characterised Cesarani's statement, "She had much in common with Eichmann. There were two people in the courtroom who looked up to the German-born judges as the best of Germany and looked down on the prosecutor as a miserable Ostjude: one was Eichmann and the other was Hannah Arendt," as a "slur" which "reveals a writer in control neither of his material nor of himself."

== Public activism ==
=== Holocaust consciousness ===
Cesarani was a member of the Home Office's Holocaust Memorial Day Strategic Group and was once Director of the AHRC Parkes Centre, part of the Parkes Institute for the Study of Jewish/non-Jewish Relations. He was co-editor of the journal Patterns of Prejudice and the Parkes-Wiener Series of books on Jewish Studies (published by Vallentine-Mitchell). In February 2005, Cesarani was awarded an OBE for "services to Holocaust Education and advising the government with regard to the establishment of Holocaust Memorial Day".

=== Israeli–Arab conflict and Zionism ===
Cesarani believed that Israel's right to exist is unquestionable, and that "[d]enying the right of Israel to exist begs some serious questions." He was strongly critical of academic and business boycotts against Israel in the United Kingdom. However he was also critical of Israeli government policy, conduct and expansionist sentiments.

He saw the controversy over the Israeli West Bank barrier as being unimportant, and that it is used as a photo opportunity for the world's media. Of the wall itself "it's a concern if land is misappropriated from the Palestinians, or if Palestinian lives become intolerable, but its true significance is in the total disintegration of trust between Jews and Palestinians", though he also believed some reactions to the barrier have been under-reported, for example that "some Arab towns, especially in southern Galilee, have welcomed the wall as a means of preventing Palestinians entering Israeli towns and adding to the unemployment and instability."

== Personal life ==
Cesarani was born in London to Henry, a hairdresser, and Sylvia (née Packman). His parents were communists, and his childhood home was not significantly characterised by Jewish activity but many of his parents' friends were Jews with similar views and his home had a Jewish ambiance which resulted in his Jewish consciousness and to volunteering on a kibbutz. An only child, he won a scholarship to Latymer Upper School in west London and went to Queens' College, Cambridge, in 1976, where he gained a first in history. A master's degree in Jewish history at Columbia University, New York, working with the scholar of Judaism Arthur Hertzberg, shaped the rest of his career. His doctorate at St Antony's College, Oxford, looked into aspects of the history of the interwar Anglo-Jewish community.

In the summer of 1974, as a result of the Yom Kippur War, Cesarani and a group of school friends together with a cousin and two of her friends spent six weeks at Kibbutz Mashabei Sadeh. Later, before starting his degree at Cambridge in 1976, he spent a gap year in Israel working at Kibbutz Givat Haim (Ihud). His involvement in Zionism was to be accompanied by nagging doubts that arose from this period, where he observed local Arabs were not accorded respect. He recalled the shock he felt on discovering that the kibbutzniks had not been forthcoming about the history of the fields where he worked, near Qaqun. He said: "We were always told that the pile of rubble at the top of the hill was a Crusader castle. It was only much later that I discovered it was an Arab village that had been ruined in the Six-Day war".

Cesarani ran marathons and cycled.

Cesarani died on 25 October 2015, following the previous month's surgery to remove a cancerous spinal tumour. He had been diagnosed with the cancer in July 2015. He spent the week before his operation checking the footnotes for his final book at the Institute of Historical Research in London, and he was still writing ten days before his death. He had completed two works scheduled to be published in 2016: Final Solution: The Fate of the Jews 1933–1949 and Disraeli: The Novel Politician.

== Bibliography ==
=== As author ===
- "An Embattled Minority: The Jews in Britain During the First World War". The Politics of Marginality: Race, the Radical Right and Minorities in Twentieth Century Britain (1st ed.). London: Routledge. 12 November 2012 [originally published 1990]. doi:10.4324/9780203043653. ISBN 9780203043653.
- Justice Delayed: How Britain Became a Refuge for Nazi War Criminals (Heinemann, 1992) Reissued by Phoenix Press in 2001. ISBN 1-84212-126-X
- The Jewish Chronicle and Anglo-Jewry 1841–1991 (Cambridge University Press, 1994) ISBN 0-521-43434-3
- Arthur Koestler: The Homeless Mind. (Heinemann, 1998) Reissued by the Free Press. ISBN 0-684-86720-6
- The Left and the Jews. The Jews and the Left (Labour Friends of Israel, 2004)
- Eichmann: His Life and Crimes, which was published in the USA under the title: Becoming Eichmann: Rethinking the Life, Crimes, and Trial of a "Desk Murderer" (Da Capo Press, 2006) ISBN 0-306-81476-5
- Major Farran's Hat: The Untold Story of the Struggle to Establish the Jewish State (Da Capo Press, 2009) ISBN 978-0-306-81845-5
- Final Solution: The Fate of the Jews 1933–1949 (Macmillan, 2016) ISBN 978-0-230-75456-0
- Disraeli: The Novel Politician (Jewish Lives, Yale University Press, 2016) ISBN 978-0-300-13751-4

=== As editor ===
- Port Jews (2002)
- The Making of Modern Anglo-Jewry (1990)
- The Final Solution: Origins and Implementation (1994)
- Genocide and Rescue: The Holocaust in Hungary, 1944 (1997)
- Port Jews: Jewish Communities in Cosmopolitan Maritime Trading Centuries, 1550–1950 (2002)
- "Bystanders" to the Holocaust: A Re-evaluation (2002)
- Citizenship, Nationality and Migration in Europe (with Mary Fulbrook 2003, first ed. 1996)
- Holocaust. Critical Concepts in Historical Studies. 6 vols. (2004)
- After the Holocaust: Challenging the Myth of Silence (with Eric J. Sundquist 2012)

== Honours and awards ==
Cesarani was appointed an Officer of the Order of the British Empire in 2005 for his services to Holocaust education. In 2006 he received a National Jewish Book Award in the History category for Becoming Eichmann: Rethinking the Life, Crimes, and Trial of a "Desk Murderer".

== Sources ==
Stone, Dan (2019). "Jewry, antisemitism and the Holocaust: the work and legacy of David Cesarani", Patterns of Prejudice, 53:1, 2-8, DOI:10.1080/0031322X.2018.1557962
