= Richard Thurlow =

British historian

Richard C. Thurlow is a historian of fascism in Britain. He is a graduate of the University of York and the University of Sussex and now an honorary lecturer at the University of Sheffield where he formerly taught.

== Selected publications ==
=== Articles ===
- "Powers of Darkness: Conspiracy, Belief and Political Strategy." Patterns of Prejudice, Vol. 12, No. 6, 1978, pp. 1–12, 23. doi:10.1080/0031322X.1978.9969469.
- "Jew Wise: Dimensions of British Political Anti-semitism, 1918-1939." Immigrants and Minorities, Vol. 6, No. 1, 1987, pp. 44–65.
- "British Fascism and State Surveillance, 1934-45." Intelligence and National Security, Vol. 1, 1988, pp. 77–99.
- "'A Very Clever Capitalist Class': British Communism and State Surveillance, 1939-1945." Intelligence and National Security, Vol. 12, No. 2, April 1997.
- "The Guardian of the 'Sacred Flame': The Failed Political Resurrection of Sir Oswald Mosley after 1945." Journal of Contemporary History, Vol. 33, No. 2, April 1998, pp. 241–254. JSTOR 260975.
- "The Evolution of the Mythical British Fifth Column, 1939-46." Twentieth Century British History, Vol. 10, No. 4, 1999, pp. 477–498.
- "Charm Offensive: The Coming out of MI5." Intelligence and National Security, Vol. 15, No. 1, 2000, pp. 183–190.

=== Books ===
- British Fascism: Essays on the Radical Right in Inter-War Britain. Croom Helm, 1980. (Editor with Kenneth Lunn)
- Fascism in Britain: A History, 1918-85. Basil Blackwell, Oxford, 1987. ISBN 0631136185
- The Secret State: British Internal Security in the Twentieth Century. Oxford University Press, Oxford, 1994.
- Fascism. Cambridge Perspectives in History. Cambridge University Press, Cambridge, 1999.
- Fascism in Modern Britain. Sutton, Stroud, 2000

=== Chapters ===
- "Blaming the Blackshirts: The Authorities and the Anti-Jewish Disturbances in the 1930s." In: P. Panayi (ed.) Racial Violence in Britain. Leicester University Press, 1993, pp. 112–129.
