= Jewish refugees from German-occupied Europe in the United Kingdom =

Aspect of World War II

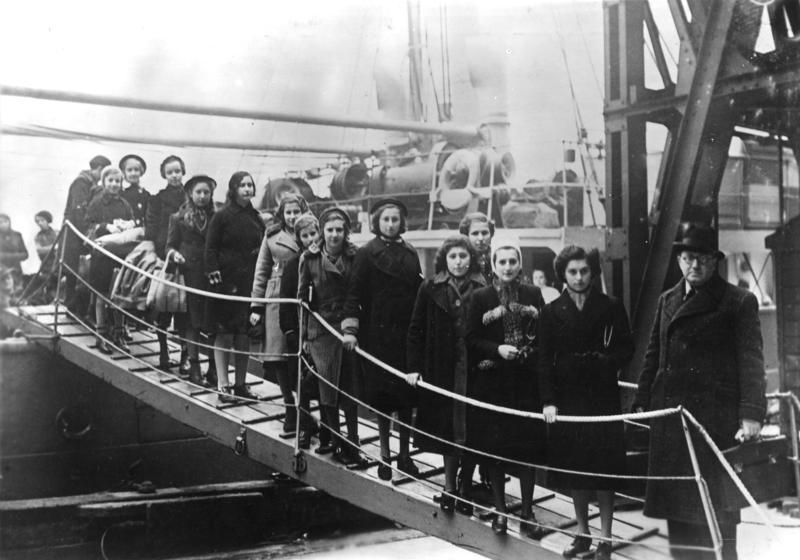
The children of Polish Jews from the region between Germany and Poland on their arrival in London on the Warsaw, February 1939.

After Adolf Hitler came into power in 1933 and enacted policies that would culminate in the Holocaust, Jews began to escape German-occupied Europe and the United Kingdom was one of the destinations. Some came on transit visas, which meant that they stayed in Britain temporarily, while waiting to be accepted by another country. Others entered the country by having obtained employment or a guarantor, or via Kindertransport. There were about 70,000 Jewish refugees who were accepted into Britain by the start of World War II on 1 September 1939, and an additional 10,000 people who made it to Britain during the war.

== Background ==
Hitler came into power in Germany in 1933, when there were about 523,000 German Jews, or less than 1% of the country's population. Subject to threats and persecution, Jews began to emigrate from that point until the start of World War II in 1939. During this time, more than 117,000 Jews left Austria and more than 300,000 left Germany. Most of these Jews, many young, were trained in a field or college educated. (Note: Many of the people who went to neighboring European countries were captured by the Nazis after May 1940, when they invaded western Europe.) Key decision-making factors about whether Jews would emigrate were whether they owned businesses, which were subject to Nazi-sponsored boycotts; if they were among the civil servants who had lost their jobs; and the degree to which they were politically active.

Initially, Germany encouraged Jews to leave, then they restricted the amount of money they could take from German banks and imposed high emigration taxes. The German government forbade emigration after October 1941. The German Jews who remained, about 163,000 in Germany and less than 57,000 from annexed Austria, were mostly elderly, and were murdered in ghettos or taken to Nazi concentration camps, where most of them also died. Although Jews could easily leave Germany initially, it was difficult to find countries in which they could live, particularly after accepting the initial wave of immigrants in Europe, Britain, and the United States.

== Immigration policy ==
Britain established the Aliens Act 1905 as a means of immigration control; it restricted the immigration of the poor, and Jews from eastern Europe. There was a steady decrease in alien admissions, partly because Jews chose other countries, like the United States: in addition, the law had the effect of deterring would-be immigrants. The Aliens Restriction Act 1914 allowed for deportation and had stricter immigration provisions.

Even more stringent, Great Britain's immigration laws of 1919 did not address or differentiate treatment based upon the circumstances of people who wished to immigrate to Britain. This meant that thousands of refugees fleeing Europe after Hitler assumed power were accepted under its tradition as a safe haven, but only temporarily. For instance, thousands of men came to Britain with transit visas, and stayed there while seeking acceptance from other countries. If it was clear that the person seeking entry was a visitor, they were generally limited to a one-month stay.

About 1937, as the rate of people looking to immigrate to Britain increased, the British government made stricter standards for those whom they would admit. One was that the refugees had to have £50 (equivalent to $4,075 in 2023) deposited in an overseas bank, but in Germany it was against the law to have foreign currency. This requirement could be waived, depending on the individual's training or education.

Otto Schiff, the director of the newly formed Jewish Refugee Committee, and Leonard Montefiore and Neville Laski, chairmen of the Board of Deputies of British Jews, met with officials of the British government in April 1933 to develop a plan that would allow for the country to take in refugees. The Jewish community said that they would provide assistance to Jewish refugees and thus provided housing, education and job training, and money to thousands of people by the end of 1939, thereby eliminating any financial burden from the government to support the newcomers. (Note: When Jewish leaders med with the Cabinet Committee on Aliens Restrictions of the Home Office in meetings beginning 6 April 1933, part of their offer to allow for more refugees to enter the country was a broader, open-ended guarantee that "all expense, whether temporary or permanent accommodation or maintenance, will be borne by the Jewish community without ultimate charge to the state." The Jewish community leaders thought that this would be a short-term arrangement for each person as they sought other countries to immigrate to. After the Anschluss, the Jewish Refugee Committee and other relief agencies sought out personal guarantors for refugees.)

The government limited the number of immigrants in 1938 and 1939. For instance, after Austria was annexed to Nazi Germany (Anschluss, 12 March 1938), the British government restricted the number of Austrian Jews who could enter Britain through strictly controlled visas.

The world seemed to be divided into two parts – those places where the Jews could not live, and those where they could not enter.

—Chaim Weizmann on the Évian Conference.

Realising a plan was needed to manage the large number of emigrants from Nazi Europe, 32 countries met in France at the Évian Conference (July 1938), but almost all of them would not loosen their immigration restrictions to take in more refugees.

Britain eased its policy for refugees after 9 November 1938, the German Kristallnacht (the Night of Broken Glass), although the numbers were limited. On that night, Jewish establishments in Germany and Austria were vandalised during protests, resulting in broken windows, damaged businesses, burned synagogues, many Jews were arrested and placed in concentration camps, and at least 31 Jews were murdered. By September 1939, 70,000 (Note: Atkins states that there were "approximately 70,000 unnaturalized Germans and Austrians were living within the borders of Great Britain" by September 1939 (start of the war).) (another reference states "more than 80,000") Jewish refugees were accepted in Britain. Most of the people settled in North West London.

There were more than 500,000 case files, though, of Jews who were not admitted according to British Jewish associations. Louise London, author of Whitehall And The Jews, 1933–1948, stated that "The (British immigration) process ... was designed to keep out large numbers of European Jews – perhaps 10 times as many as it let in."

When World War II was declared (1 September 1939), Britain no longer allowed immigration from Nazi-controlled countries. There were also no plans to manage the refugee crisis as the result of the Bermuda Conference of the Allies in April 1943, by which time it was known that the Nazi regime intended to exterminate all of the Jews in Europe (the plan known as the Final Solution). There were 10,000 Jewish refugees who "managed to find their way into Britain" throughout the war (1939–1945).

Britain did not allow Jews to immigrate to Palestine, which was under British control at that time. Even so, there were some Jews who illegally immigrated (Aliyah Bet) to Palestine.

== Means of immigration ==
=== Guarantees ===
The Government created a scheme whereby a Guarantor bought a Guarantee for £50 to ensure the person for whom the guarantee was given would not become a financial burden for the British Government. This was a practice of the Jewish community to help Jews escape and Quakers saved an estimated 6,000 Jews with guarantees.

=== Self-supporting ===
A guarantor was not needed if an individual was self-supporting, either because they were wealthy or because they had made arrangements for employment. There were certain categories of employment where there existed a known shortage of workers such as nursing, domestic help and butlers.

=== Kindertransport ===
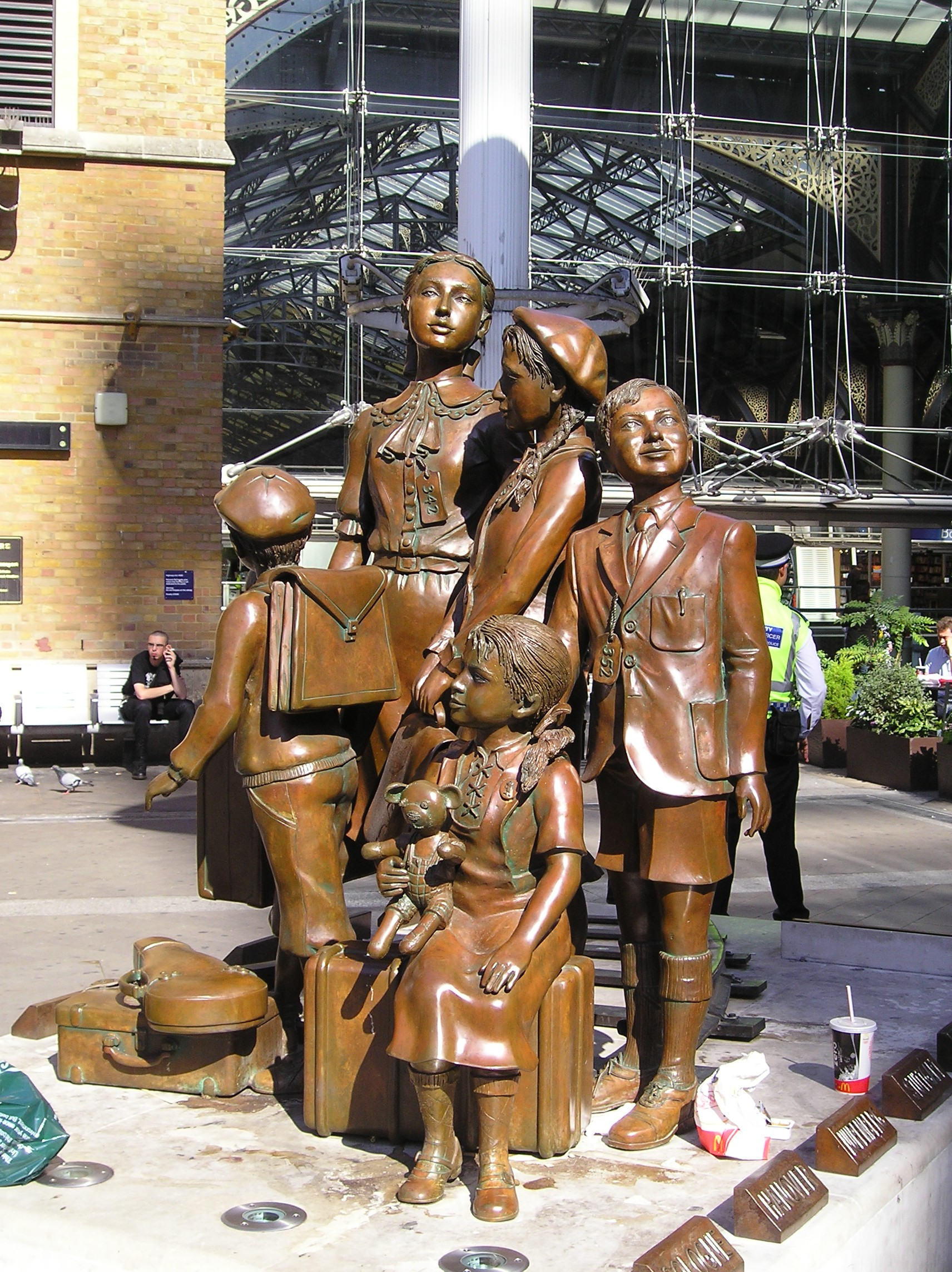
Kindertransport – The Arrival sculpture in central London marks the Kindertransport when the UK took in nearly 10,000 Jewish children prior to WWII. Of Jewish heritage, Nicholas Winton was a notable member of the operation.

Following Kristallnacht in November 1938, Jewish and Quaker community leaders met with the British government to explore ways in which children could be saved from the actions of the Nazi regime. The British government allowed for the immigration without visas of Jewish children, but without their parents, through the Children's Transport program called Kindertransport. Between December 1938 and the start of World War II on Sept 1, 1939 when the program was forced to end, nearly 10,000 Kindertransport children had been rescued. and had arrived in England.

Because it was not safe for Jews to travel to Germany, six volunteers from the Friends Service Council traveled to Berlin. The gathering of the children, paperwork, and travel plans were coordinated between Quakers in Vienna and Berlin and Jewish organizations. Their care and travel was also coordinated in Britain by the group Movement for the Care of Children. Then, the children were placed in boarding schools, including Quaker schools, often due to scholarships offered by the schools; in foster homes; or in hostels.

=== Kitchener Camp ===
Organised by the precursor of World Jewish Relief, around 4,000 mainly Austrian and German adult Jewish men received an arranged passage and were accepted for accommodation in the Kitchener Camp in Kent during 1939, on condition they would not be granted UK citizenship or work, and must emigrate to the US, Australia and elsewhere. At the start of the war, 887 volunteered for the Pioneer Corps. After the Dunkirk evacuation in May 1940, public opinion turned against German-speaking refugees, who some suspected of being spies or saboteurs. Those not serving in the war effort were interned or deported to Australia and Canada and the camp was closed.

== Assimilation ==
It was difficult for Jewish refugees to find work, regardless of their education, except as domestic workers. This also meant that Jewish refugees who were physicians often could not find practice in medicine, even though there was a shortage of health care providers. Some of the concern was economic. During a period of high unemployment, many were concerned about losing job opportunities due to the influx of refugees. Many trades unions, such as the shoe and bootmakers, "cited the unemployment of their own members as the reason they opposed a loosening of immigration controls". Yet other unions, such as the National Union of Agricultural Workers, with similar numbers of unemployed union members, argued for an increase in the number of work permits.

Legislation was enacted in the 1930s which mandated that no more than 5% of the total students in any particular school were Jewish, limiting the rate at which Jewish children could be admitted to state schools. The press, which was generally not supportive of refugees, incorrectly reported that there were more Jews in Britain than had been in Germany in the summer of 1938. Kushner and Katharine Knox state in their book Refugees In An Age Of Genocide, "Of all the groups in the 20th century, refugees from Nazism are now widely and popularly perceived as 'genuine', but at the time German, Austrian and Czechoslovakian Jews were treated with ambivalence and outright hostility as well as sympathy."

== Resources ==
Bloomsbury House in London was a resource for the immigrants. Located there were Jewish organizations, like the Central British Fund for German Jewry and the Jewish Refugees Committee, and other organizations that supported Jewish refugees, who not only needed housing, schools for children, and other means of logistical support, but were also coping with the emotional and psychological issues of being a refugee.

In the late 1930s, there were about 20,000 Quakers and it is believed that nearly every one of them contributed in some way to easing the plight of the Jewish refugees. The Society of Friends offered assistance across Britain by supporting children at Quaker schools and boarding schools, by running agricultural training programs that included room and board, by assisting with job search efforts, and by running free or subsidised hostels. Besides making donations, members fostered children, served on their local refugee committees, and helped at local hostels. The Nobel Peace Prize was awarded in 1947 jointly to American and British Quakers for their role in assisting Jewish refugees during the Holocaust. (Note: For instance, Peter Kurer, whose work resulted in the establishment of an archive of the Society of Friends role during the Holocaust at Yad Vashem, said that the Quakers helped save the lives of his family, which included his 91 year-old great-grandmother, eight other members of his family, and himself, a child refugee. He believes, through his research, that Quakers saved about 27,000 Jews.)

== Mitigating the threat of German espionage ==
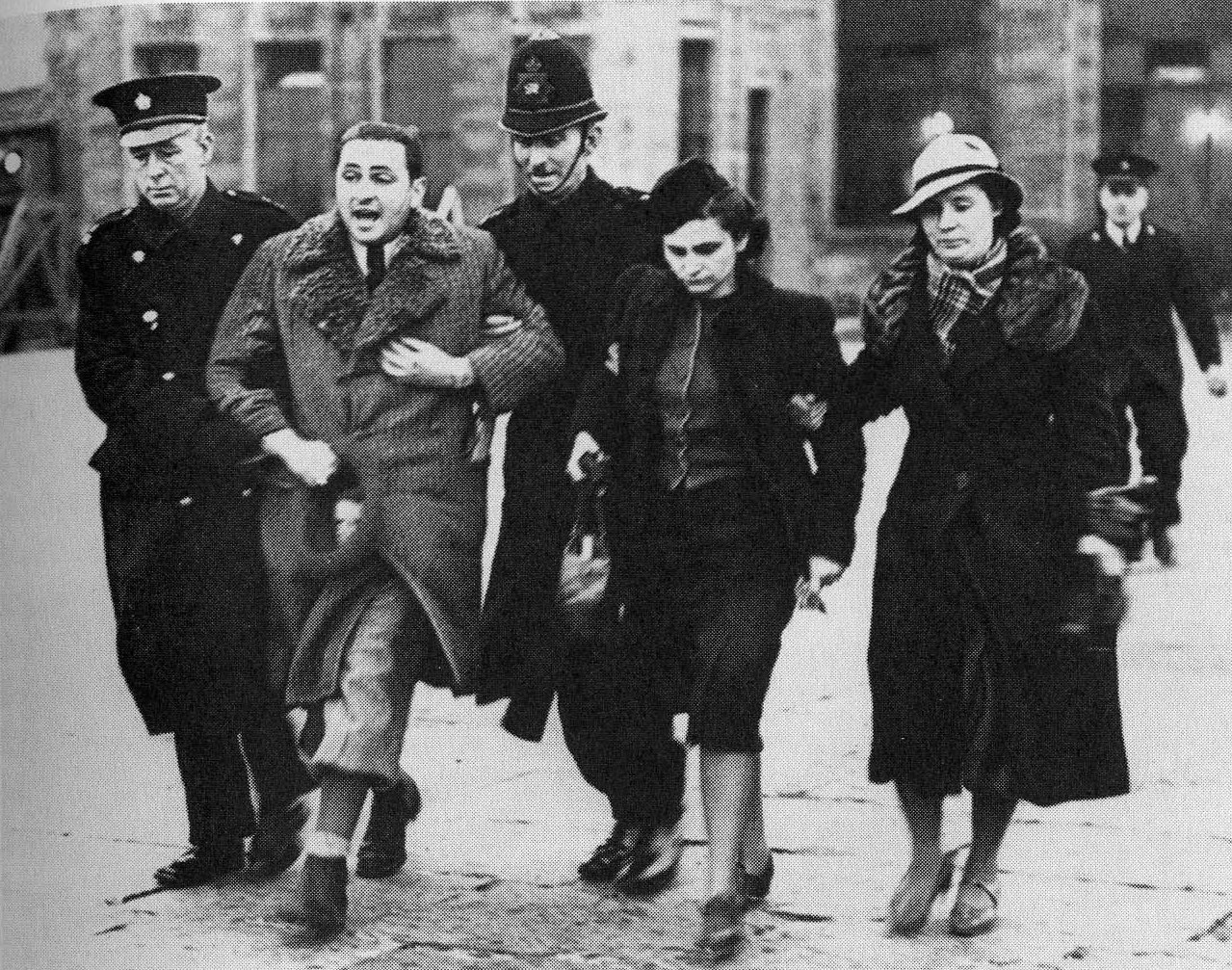
Jewish refugees from Czechoslovakia being marched away by British police at Croydon Airport in March 1939.

With the beginning of the war, the British government preferred to avoid internment (but see section below), and needed to weigh the risk of the danger posed by foreigners that wished to harm the empire. The Secretary of State for the Home Department, Sir John Anderson, developed plans for dealing with the threat, informed by the processes used during World War I. About 2,000 German refugees returned to Germany after the British issued a general request for the foreigners to return to their native country. There were repercussions for people who had lied to get passports or who had entered the country illegally. In accordance with the Emergency Powers (Defence) Act 1939, the government initiated policies to control immigrants from hostile countries, including mandatory weekly check-ins with the police, requiring permits to travel more than five miles from their homes, and orders to give up maps, cameras, firearms, and bicycles. At first, these restrictions applied to males between 16 and 60, but were later extended to women, people over 60, and some children. It was common for refugees to be fined or imprisoned over these policies.

== Internment ==
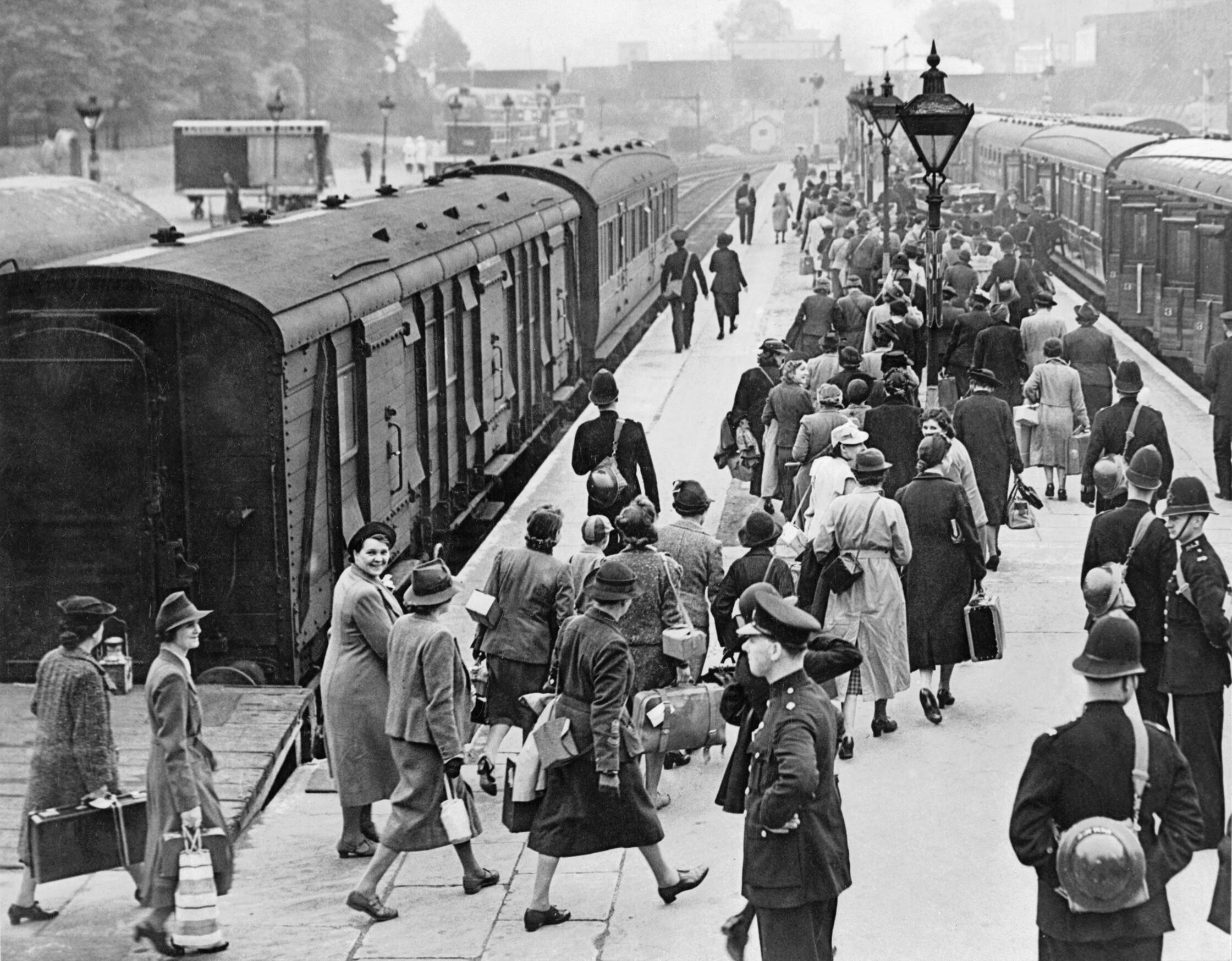
Women classed as enemy aliens being escorted by police and officials to board trains at a London station, at the start of their journey for internment on the Isle of Man early in the Second World War.

Italians, Germans and Austrians, including Jewish refugees, were called "enemy aliens" and interned after mid-1940, when Northern and Western European countries were captured by Germany. There was fear that anyone with a German accent could be a spy. Jewish refugees were put into internment camps with other German and Austrian people, including those who were Nazi sympathizers. People were put into groups (A, B, C) by tribunals depending upon how dangerous that they might be (Class A was for the most dangerous and Class C was the least dangerous) and thus determined how long that they might be held and where they were located. The tribunals were initially most concerned about men, but by June 1940 they had become stricter about the guidelines for who would avoid internment.

Some Jews, about 8,000 people, were deported to Australia (such as on the HMT Dunera) and Canada. Of those, not all of them made it to their destination, as they were killed while aboard ships, like the SS Arandora Star, that were struck by German torpedoes.

There were about 30,000 Jewish refugees held in Britain in internment camps on the Isle of Man and in locations throughout England and Scotland. Later in the war, when there was no longer a threat of invasion, internees were released. Some of the people deported to Canada and Australia were allowed to return to Britain.

== War service ==
Several "Aliens Companies" were established in the Royal Pioneer Corps for refugees. There were also male and female refugees that served in other branches of the military, including German-speaking commando units. Serving in the military was especially dangerous because, in case of being taken captive, there was a high probability of being executed as a traitor by the Germans. Still, the number of German-born Jews joining the British forces was exceptionally high; by the end of the war, one in seven Jewish refugees (10,000 people) from Germany had volunteered to serve the British forces. Their knowledge of the German language and customs proved particularly useful. Refugees served with distinction and some died during the war.

There were also civilian positions, such as positions in civil defence and in munitions factories, that were performed by refugees. This was a difficult times for families that were separated due to the war and internment. In June 1941, the Association of Jewish Refugees was founded to provide such support.

== After the war ==
=== Accepted refugees ===
Many refugees served in the administration of the British occupation army in Germany and Austria after the war.

With the war over, many of the refugees settled into British life, particularly in North West London; had families; became nationalized; and took British names. Venues for meeting with other refugees included the Association of Jewish Refugees (AJR) club, Cosmo Restaurant, the Dorice, and Club 1943. Organizations like the Leo Baeck Institute, Freud Museum, and Wiener Library were founded and became part of British culture.

Many people established successful careers in publishing, medicine, science, psychoanalysis, and other occupations. Notable scientists include Max Perutz, Rudolf Peierls, Francis Simon, Ernst Boris Chain, and Hans Adolf Krebs. Intellectuals include art historians Nikolaus Pevsner and Ernst Gombrich, sociologists Norbert Elias and Karl Mannheim, and philosophers Karl Popper and Ludwig Wittgenstein.

Former refugees influenced the music scene, with the emergence of the Amadeus Quartet and Edinburgh Festival. Noted individuals of the arts include singer Richard Tauber, actor Anton Walbrook, and painter Lucian Freud. Writers who made their mark include Elias Canetti and Arthur Koestler.

In the 1950s, West Germany began to make restitution payments to the refugees.

=== Displaced persons ===
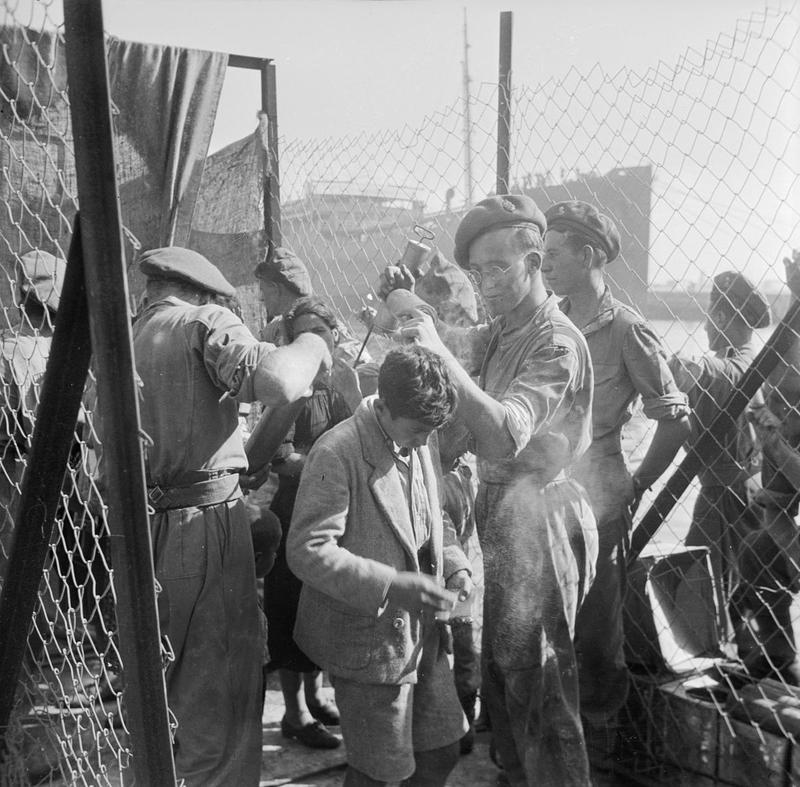
Jewish immigrants leave Haifa for internment in Cyprus, August 1946

There was little legal immigration to Palestine, but between 1945 and 1948 there were thousands of displaced Jewish people who attempted to enter illegally. Those who were caught were interned in detention camps in Cyprus. Concerned about provoking anti-semitism, there was a decision by the cabinet not to allow Jewish Holocaust survivors to immigrate, but there was a large number of other refugees immediately following the end of the war.

British Mandate authorities gave up control of the Palestine region after Jews rebelled against policies that continued to prevent immigration by refugees or Holocaust survivors. In 1947, the United Nations adopted a Partition Plan for Mandatory Palestine recommending the creation of independent Arab and Jewish states and an internationalized Jerusalem. The State of Israel was created in May 1948 and many Jews then in immigrated into the new country.

== See also ==
- History of the Jews during World War II
- History of the Jews in England
- History of the Jews in Ireland
- History of the Jews in Northern Ireland
- History of the Jews in Scotland
- History of the Jews in Wales
- Committee for Jewish Refugees (Netherlands)
