= Committee for Jewish Refugees (Netherlands) =

Dutch charitable organization aiding Jewish refugees (1933–1941)

- Comité voor Joodsche Vluchtelingen
- Abbreviation: CJV
- Formation: 1933; 93 years ago
- Founded at: Amsterdam, Netherlands
- Dissolved: March 1941; 85 years ago
- Type: Non-profit
- Legal status: Dissolved
- Purpose: Aid and support for Jewish refugees from Nazi Germany and other annexed regions
- Headquarters: 'Gravenhekje 7, Amsterdam
- Chairman: André Herzberger (initial), Dr. David Cohen (1933-1941)

The Committee for Jewish Refugees (Dutch: Comité voor Joodsche Vluchtelingen) (CJR) was a Dutch charitable organization that operated from 1933 to 1941. At first, it managed the thousands of Jewish refugees who were fleeing the Nazi regime in Germany. These refugees were crossing the border from Germany into the Netherlands. The committee largely decided which of the refugees could remain in the Netherlands. The others generally returned to Germany. For the refugees permitted to stay, it provided support in several ways. These included direct financial aid and assistance with employment and with further emigration.

Then, in 1938 Germany annexed Austria and the Sudetenland regions of Czechoslovakia. Many refugees then came from those regions as well. On the night of 9 November 1938, there were violent programs against Jews across the German Reich, and the imprisonment of thousands of Jews without charges. This led to a further increase in the number of Jews streaming across the border seeking refuge and further emigration. Ultimately, the committee had become "one of the most powerful organizations in Dutch Jewry in the 1930s."

World War II started in September 1939. The Netherlands were invaded and occupied by Germany in May 1940. The committee continued its work until Germany closed it in March 1941. One of the committee's main goals had been to help Jewish refugees emigrate. About 22,000 refugees had left the continent of Europe with the committee's help. These refugees thus escaped murder in The Holocaust. Germany occupied the Netherlands until 1945. About 100,000 Jews from the Netherlands were deported and killed during the German occupation.

== Establishment ==
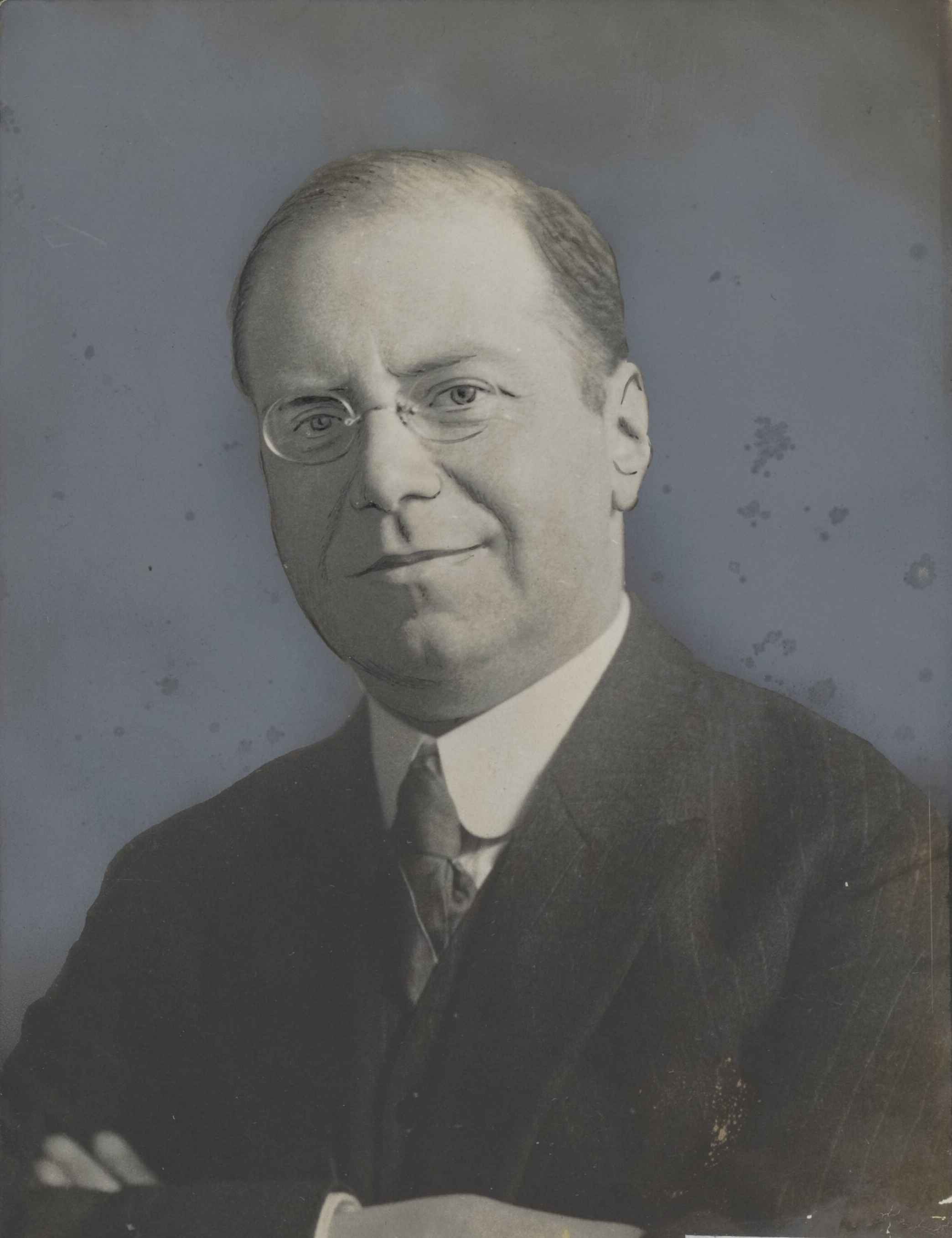
David Cohen (1882–1967) was the chairman of the Committee for Jewish Refugees from 1933 to 1941.

The Committee for Jewish Refugees (CJV) in Amsterdam was established in April 1933, and disbanded in 1941. It was an offshoot of the Committee for Special Jewish Affairs (Dutch: Comité voor Bijzondere Joodsche Belangen - CBJB), which was founded in 1933 by Abraham Asscher and David Cohen. The committees were a response to the tide of refugees who were entering the Netherlands from neighboring Germany in 1933. The National Socialist (Nazi) party had taken power there early in the year. Their regime had promptly instituted laws and measures that discriminated specifically against Jews. Hundreds of thousands of Jews and others began to flee Germany.

The CJV was charged with direct services to the early refugees. André Herzberger was the first chairman of the committee. He was soon succeeded by Dr. David Cohen, who held the position until the CJV was dissolved in 1941. Until 1939 the committee was located at 'Gravenhekje 7 in Amsterdam. It selected some refugees for assistance with housing, expenses, and employment as well as with further emigration beyond the European continent. Other refugees were denied assistance. Most of them had to return to Germany. The premise of the committee was that its work would be in accordance with the Dutch government's refugee policies. In addition, the committee did not receive financial support from the Dutch government, but instead paid for its work through the charitable contributions of private Dutch citizens and of several international organizations.

The Amsterdam Committee was the most prominent of many Committees for Jewish Refugees in the Netherlands. Particularly active provincial committees included those in Rotterdam, The Hague, and Enschede. The abbreviation CJV is generally applied to the Amsterdam Committee, which managed work permits, entry visas and identity passes. The CJV also represented the provincial committees to the Dutch government and to the other organizations that supported the refugees both in the Netherlands and abroad. The provincial committees reported to the central committee in Amsterdam about the situation of refugees in the provinces and provided accounting for their local contributions and their expenses to the Amsterdam committee. Some of the provincial committees were able to contribute financially to the central committee, whereas others received additional support from the central committee beyond what they could raise locally.

== Employees ==
Gertrude van Tijn, 1936

Dr. Erich Rosenberg, 1942

The committee had more than a hundred paid and volunteer staff. The composition varied greatly, since the staff was largely recruited from the ranks of the refugees, and they would succeed in emigrating or return to Germany. Everyday affairs of the CJV were managed by Raphael Henri Eitje and Gertrude van Tijn-Cohn. Eitje was from the Hachnosas Ourechim, an organization that provided help and shelter in Amsterdam to Jewish refugees. van Tijn was from the Jewish Women's Organization (Dutch: Joodse Vrouwen Organisatie). Cohen focused in particular on his work for the CBJB, which meant that he brought refugee interests to the attention of the Dutch Government and contacts with other Jewish organizations. He also represented the Dutch Refugee Council at international meetings of refugee organizations.

Eitje was instructed to maintain contact with the Dutch authorities. He led the department responsible for passes and work permits. van Tijn was responsible for the initial reception of refugees, i.e. the intake interviews and registration, housing and food distribution. Then she was responsible for managing the finances, she headed the department for emigration and professional training and became the contact person for foreign aid organizations. She made reviews of the work done by the refugee committee and suggested annual and monthly reports together.

Two other key employees within the CJV were Marianne van Stedum, who was involved in social work, and J. de Miranda who looked after the general affairs.

After the Kristallnacht pogroms in Germany and Austria on 9–10 November 1938, there was a great increase in the number of refugees coming to the Netherlands. Dr. Erich Rosenberg, who had been working privately to facilitate the emigration of Jews away from Germany, joined the CJV as Head of the Welfare Department at this time. He shared daily management of the CJV's work with Gertrude van Tijn. Like van Tijn, during the German invasion of May 1940 he declined the opportunity to leave the Netherlands. He and van Tijn continued their work with the CJV through its dissolution in March 1941.

== Tasks and departments of the Committee ==
The events in Germany and the measures taken by the Dutch government had influence on the work of the Committee for Jewish Refugees. The emphasis increasingly shifted from providing for its own maintenance to managing the increasingly large flows of refugees and promoting emigration. Some reorganization was needed to meet the new demands made to the organization. Although the departments sometimes changed, the tasks performed by the committee remained broadly similar.

=== Selection ===
All refugees from Germany were registered upon arrival. Refugees who would be financially independent while in the Netherlands were generally able to stay. For the others, only some were selected to receive assistance from the CJV; "economic" refugees were denied assistance and generally had to return to Germany. These policies were developed in concert with the Dutch government, which was unwilling to provide financial support to the refugees and expected such support to come primarily from the CJV. There were several motivations. By wielding strict criteria for admission, the CJV could give greater help to those that were eligible for support. Strict policies were also seen as deterring flight from Germany to the Netherlands, which could have overwhelmed the resources of the CJV. According to historian Dan Michman, an average of 60% of the refugees were turned away during the first years. Sometimes the number of refugees turned back was as high as 90%.

=== Welfare Department ===
For selected refugees, the Welfare Department assisted with shelter, food, clothing and, if necessary, medical assistance.

=== Reconstructive help ===
In the first few years, some selected refugees were able to secure employment or start small enterprises. The CJV mediated with the Dutch government for residence and work permits and ensured the periodic renewal of these licenses. The CJV also provided small loans to establish or maintain an enterprise. Over time the refugees were typically less able to pay back the loans, but collection efforts were minimal since without these enterprises the expenses of the refugees would have been borne by the committee.

=== Emigration ===
The SS Bodegraven was the last ship to leave the Netherlands before ports were closed during the German invasion. The committee had spread the word that refugees would be allowed on board. The ship left IJmuiden harbor on 14 May 1940, carrying about 250 refugees including 74 Kindertransport children. They were ultimately landed in Great Britain.

The committee brokered with the Vreemdelingenpolitie (lit. Aliens Police) for entry visas for refugees. The Dutch government policy was aimed at minimizing the numbers of entry visas that were granted to refugees, with priority to those refugees whose further emigration looked likely. The promotion of emigration was therefore one of the main tasks of the committee. Over the years, the Emigration Department helped more than 18,000 refugees emigrate from the Netherlands, as well as assisting the direct emigration of more than 3,000 people in other countries.

=== Vocational Training ===
Some refugees whose work experience was not suitable for further emigration were retrained as skilled workers. The Vocational Training Department also arranged for training at two sites. The Foundation for Jewish Labor (Dutch: Stichting Joodsche Arbeid ) operated the Nieuwesluis Work Village (Dutch: Werkdorp Nieuwesluis) in Wieringen. The Association for Professional Training of Palestine Pioneers (Dutch: Vereniging voor Vakopleiding van Palestina Pioniers) operated in Deventer and specifically facilitated emigration to Palestine.

=== Office hours ===
The refugee committee held twice weekly office hours for German Jews who were registered with the committee. They could go for information on passports, work permits, education of children, emigration possibilities and taxes.

=== Camp Division ===
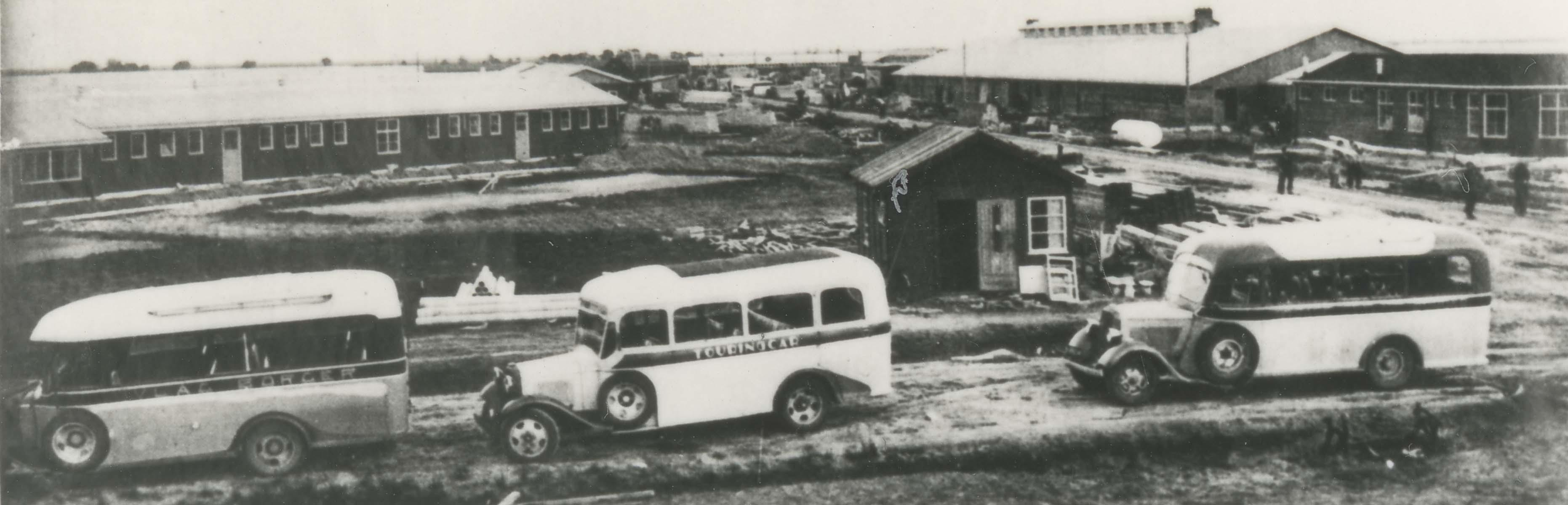
Barracks in the Central Refugee Camp near Westerbork (1938 or 1939). The buses in the foreground were used to transport the camp's residents to and from the camp.

After the Kristallnacht pogroms on 10 November 1938, many refugees who fled to the Netherlands were accommodated in camps, and a Camp Division was formed. The representation of the interests of these people, provision of clothing, a cash allowance, and advice on possible emigration was the task of the Camp Division. When the Dutch government decided to build a Central Refugee Camp (Dutch: Centraal Vluchtelingenkamp) near Westerbork, the CJV was required to raise more than 1 million guilders to underwrite the expenses of operating the camp.

The refugee camps continued to operate after the German invasion and occupation of the Netherlands in May 1940. In 1942, the Central Refugee Camp was converted by the German authorities into the Westerbork Transit Camp (German: Durchgangslager Westerbork). It temporarily housed Jewish and other prisoners before their deportation to other countries. Most of the deported prisoners, more than 100,000, were murdered at Auschwitz and other concentration camps.

=== Kindertransport and the Children's Committee ===
Following Kristallnacht in November 1938, a Kindertransport was organized to move children - without their parents - to countries outside of the German Reich. In the Netherlands, Truus Wijsmuller-Meijer negotiated an agreement with the Dutch government to accept 1500 children who were en route to Great Britain and other countries. The CJV secured a grant of $50,000 ($800,000 in 2014 value) from the American Jewish Joint Distribution Committee for the expenses of these children, and furthermore underwrote their full expenses while they were in the Netherlands. Many of these children were placed in homes in Great Britain. The Kindertransport from the Netherlands ended with the German occupation in May 1940. On 14 May 1940, the very last group of 74 children departed from IJmuiden port (near Amsterdam) on the SS Bodegraven. The ship also carried about two hundred other refugees, leaving many more ashore. Wijsmuller-Meijer and Gertrude van Tijn from the CJV accompanied the children to the ship, and then returned to Amsterdam.

== Connections of the Committee ==
=== Werkdorp Nieuwesluis ===
The central building of the Werkdorp Nieuwesluis in 1938; the photograph was taken by Roman Vishniac as part of a series commissioned by the American Jewish Joint Distribution Committee.

The CJV placed some younger refugees in the Werkdorp Nieuwesluis (lit. Work Village Nieuwesluis) in Wieringen. The Work Village was established in 1934 on an area of 300 hectares (740 acres). 16 to 25 year olds were trained in agriculture and horticulture with a view to emigration to Palestine, which was called "Hakhshara". Gertrude van Tijn was the co-founder and secretary of the Work Village. She worked here with the Stichting Joodse Arbeid (Foundation for Jewish Labor) that had the practical control of the labor settlement. The Work Village was closed in August 1941 by the German occupation authorities.

In 1938, photographer Roman Vishniac photographed Werkdorp Nieuwesluis under a commission from the American Jewish Joint Distribution Committee. An archive of these photographs is available through the International Center of Photography.

=== Jewish Press Commission ===
The Jewish Press Commission was a subcommittee of the CBJB which was co-financed by the CJV. The Jewish Press Commission informed the Dutch press and individuals on the situation of the Jews in Germany. This committee received material from the Jewish Central Information Office (run in Amsterdam and, after 1939, in London by Dr. Alfred Wiener), from the international Jewish organizations, and from world press reports regarding the anti-Semitic policies of the German regime. The Jewish Central Information Office also received a small grant from the CJV.

=== Clubhouse ===
In 1936 at the initiative of the CJV and the Jewish Women's Organization a clubhouse (Dutch: clubhuis) was opened where German refugees could spend their afternoons and evenings. There was a library and language courses were organized. There were also sports facilities, and concerts and lectures were presented. The CJV subsidized the club and was in close contact with its management.

=== Westerbork Central Refugee Camp ===
After the Kristallnacht pogrom against Jews in Germany that occurred from 9 to 10 November 1938, there was an increase in the number of Jews from Germany seeking refuge in the Netherlands. The Dutch Department of Justice selected the refugees who would be permitted to enter. The Jewish Refugee Committees created lists of refugees who were eligible to submit for entry. The Dutch government proposed the requirement that these new refugees be housed in camps instead of being housed privately, and that the CJV would facilitate their further emigration as soon as possible. The committee did not influence the number of refugees who would be allowed, but it was asked to financially guarantee the shelter in the camps. The Dutch government did not accept responsibility for the refugees. Within the three days required by the Dutch government, the CJV was able to underwrite the operating expenses of the camp with a sum of one million guilders.

The Central Refugee Camp (Dutch: Centraal Vluchtelingenkamp) was built in Hooghalen near Westerbork. The first 22 refugees entered the camp in October 1939. After the German occupation of the Netherlands in May 1940, this Camp became a transit camp for Jews and others who were being transported as prisoners to concentration camps in Germany and other countries.

== Problems encountered by the CJV ==
Money problems, the increasing flow of refugees, and the increasingly stringent policies of the Dutch government made the work of the committee increasing more difficult as the years passed. After May 1934, obtaining a work permit was no longer possible for refugees whose work could be performed by a Dutchman. By the end of 1937 the government had made it virtually impossible for a refugee to start a business. Ultimately, refugees could no longer get work and residence permits at all. Consequently, more and more refugees could no longer provide for themselves, and the committee's expenses to assist their livelihood rose. The Dutch government's policy was aimed an encouraging refugees in the Netherlands to leave as soon as possible, either by returning to their home country, usually Germany, or by emigration. Unfortunately, obtaining emigration visas also became more and more difficult as the number of countries willing to accept refugees declined through the 1930s.

== Dissolution of the CJV ==
After the German occupation in May 1940, the committee's employees remained active, but no archival material was preserved to document their work. In March 1941, both the CJV and CBJB were dissolved by order of the German authorities, and their activities were transferred to the Jewish Council of Amsterdam (Dutch: Joodse Raad voor Amsterdam). On 29 September 1943, the last employees of the CJV who had not gone into hiding were sent to the Westerbork transit camp.

== See also ==
- Netherlands in World War II
- History of the Jews in the Netherlands
- Jews escaping from Nazi Europe to Britain

== Sources ==
- Cohen, David (1955). Zwervend en dolend: de Joodse vluchtelingen in Nederland in de jaren 1933-1940. Met een inleiding over de jaren 1900-1933 [Wandering and going astray: the Jewish refugees in the Netherlands in the years 1933-1940. With an introduction for the years 1900-1933] (in Dutch). Haarlem: De erven F. Bohn. OCLC 459327937.
- Comité voor Bijzondere Joodsche Belangen (1938). De arbeid van het Comité voor Bijzondere Joodsche Belangen. Maart 1933-1938: Vij jaren vluchtelingenhulp [The Work of the Committee for Special Jewish Affairs. March 1933-1938. Five years of assistance to refugees.] (in Dutch). Amsterdam: Joachimsthal's drukkerijbedrijf. OCLC 28526162.
- Esh, Shaul; Michman, Dan (2007). "Cohen, David". In Skolnik, Fred; Berenbaum, Michael (eds.). Encyclopaedia Judaica. Vol. 5 (2 ed.). Thomson Gale. ISBN 9780028659329. OCLC 70174939.
- Jong, L. de (1969). Het Koninkrijk der Nederlanden in de Tweede Wereldoorlog, deel 1 [The Kingdom of the Netherlands in the Second World War, Part 1] (in Dutch). Den Haag. OCLC 313666.
- Michman, Dan (1981). "The Committee for Jewish Refugees in Holland, 1933-1940". Yad Vashem Studies. XIV. Jerusalem: 205–232. No online access.
- Moore, R. (2012). Refugees from Nazi Germany in the Netherlands 1933–1940. Springer Science & Business Media. ISBN 9789400943681. OCLC 12978293.
- Stegeman, H.B.J.; Vorsteveld, J.P. (1983). Het joodse werkdorp in de Wieringermeer, 1934–1941 [The Jewish Work Village in Wieringermeer: 1934–1941] (in Dutch). J.W. Reutlinger (contributor). Zutphen: Walburg Pers. ISBN 9789060111505. OCLC 12971718.
- Tijn, Gertrude van (1959). "Oh life of joy and sorrow : Laughter and tears". Center for Jewish History. Typescripts of van Tijn's unpublished memoirs are held by the Center for Jewish History. An early version was titled The World Was Mine 1890-1950. The center has posted images for the typescript in two parts, each of which is separately paginated. Page citations in this article refer to the second part held by the center.
- Wasserstein, Bernard (2014). The Ambiguity of Virtue: Gertrude van Tijn and the Fate of the Dutch Jews. Harvard University Press. ISBN 9780674281387. OCLC 861478330.
