= Royal Asscher Diamond Company =

Dutch diamond-cutting company

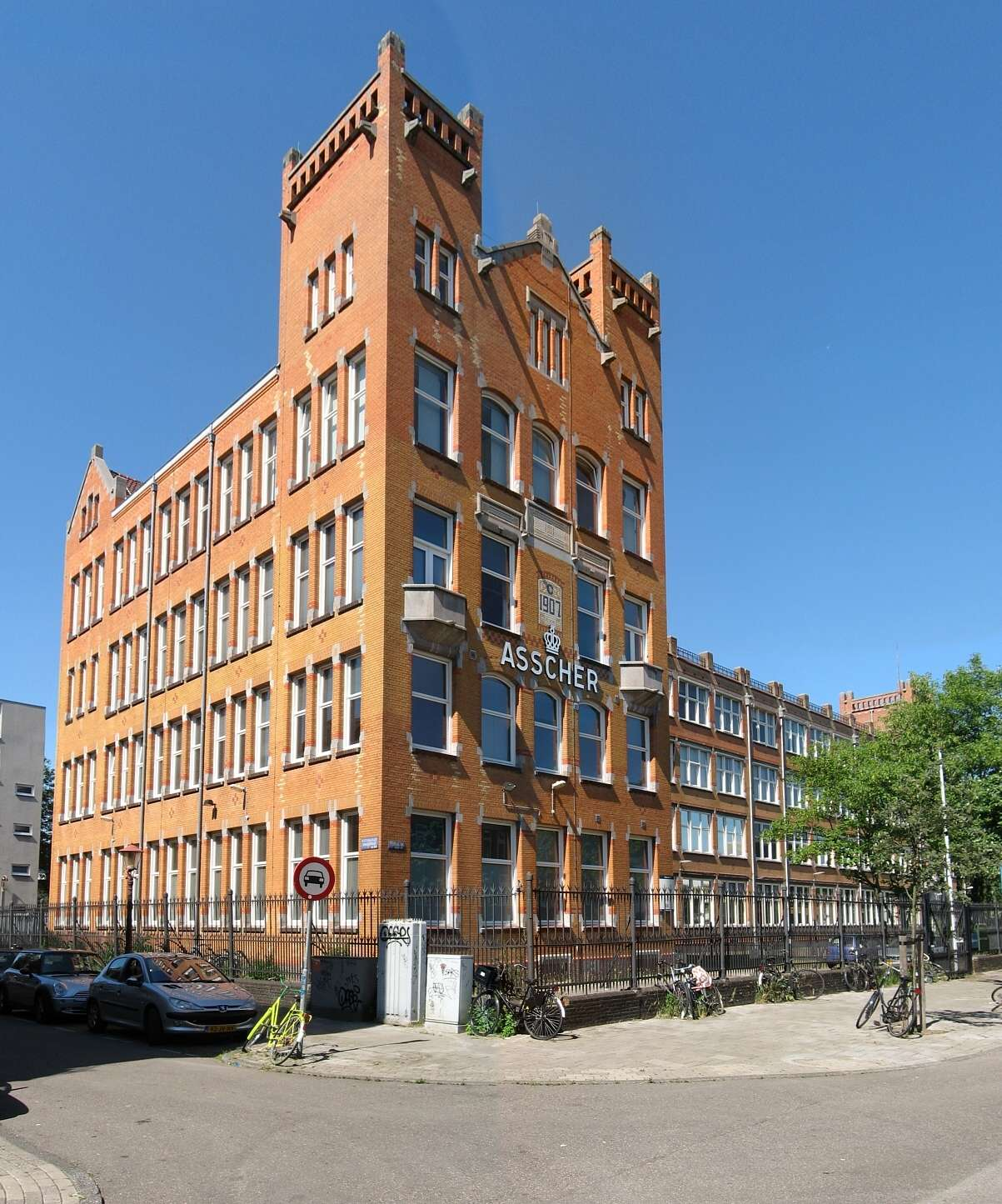
The Asscher Diamond Factory former headquarters on the Tolstraat 127 in Amsterdam

The Royal Asscher Diamond Company (Dutch: Koninklijke Asscher Diamant Maatschappij) is a Dutch company founded in 1854 by the Asscher family of gemcutters. The company is responsible for cutting some of the most famous diamonds in the world including the largest diamond ever found. Its headquarters still stand at its original location Tolstraat 127 in Amsterdam, the Netherlands. The company also has regional headquarters in New York City (Royal Asscher of America) and Tokyo (Royal Asscher of Japan).

Royal Asscher is still owned by the Asscher family. The Asscher Diamond Company, made famous at the turn of the 20th century by Joseph and Abraham Asscher, became Royal Asscher Diamond Company in 1980 when it was bestowed with the Dutch Royal Predicate from Queen Juliana of the Netherlands in recognition of the company's stature in the Netherlands. In 2011 Queen Beatrix perpetuated the Royal Prefix for another 25 years.

== History ==
In 1854 Joseph Isaac Asscher established the I.J Asscher diamond company, named for his son Isaac Joseph Asscher, who followed in his father's footsteps and entered the diamond industry. He passed down his expertise to his five sons, including Joseph and Abraham. Under Joseph and Abraham, the company was known as the Asscher Diamond Company and cut diamonds to be set in jewellery for world famous boutiques. As one of the largest diamond polishing companies at that time, its private clients included royalty, celebrities, and politicians.

=== The Asscher Cut ===
In 1902 Joseph Asscher designed and patented his original Asscher cut, the world's first patented diamond cut, to protect it from replication by others. The Company held its exclusive patent until the Second World War and saw strong sales internationally, particularly during the 1920s and 30s.

The original design had 58 step-cut facets, a small table, high crown and steep pavilion with cut corners. An accurate description would be a cut cornered square emerald cut diamond.

Also known as square emerald cuts, Asscher cut diamonds are roughly square in shape when viewed from above but have cut corners for more light to enter the diamond. They typically have 50 or 58 facets and their ideal length to width ratio is 1 to 1.04.

The Asscher cut was a staple of art deco and art nouveau era jewellery, with its straight lines and faceting arrangement aligning with the clean and graphic elements espoused by the movement. Because of the facet arrangement, high crown and depth, Asschers are known for creating a "hall of mirrors" effect.

Almost 100 years after the Original Asscher Cut was first conceived, Joseph Asscher's great-grand nephews, Edward and Joop Asscher, revised the design, adding sixteen additional facets to make it reminiscent of the Cullinan II diamond of the Imperial Crown. The result is a 74-facet step-cut square diamond.

By adding facets on the outside of the diamond, the Royal Asscher Round Brilliant Cut removes some of the darker elements seen in a traditional round diamond, even an ideal cut. The effect is a crisp, clear centre, which though true to the round diamond shape is distinctively different with 74 facets compared to the generic diamond's 58.

The Asscher family launched The Royal Asscher Oval Cut in 2018. Like the company's other diamond cuts the Royal Asscher Oval Cut is patented, with 74 facets compared to the generic round diamond's usual 58. Edward Asscher (fifth generation) and Mike Asscher (sixth generation) played with proportions and faceting patterns, creating a modified-brilliant faceting style.

The Royal Asscher Cushion Cut was launched in 2018, the diamond has additional faceting on the table and bottom of its design, which exposes the diamond's sparkle potential without losing the soft pillowy elegance of the cut. Like Royal Asscher's other diamond cuts the design is patented.

The Asscher family also patented the Trilliant cut in the 1970s.

=== The Excelsior diamond ===
In 1903, at 997 carats (199.4 g), the Excelsior diamond was the largest diamond found, to date. The gem required expert handling to be properly carved: inclusions within the rough diamond prevented it from being polished as a single stone. Abraham Asscher was charged with cleaving the Excelsior; to minimize flaws, he carved the stone into ten diamonds which were primarily sold to anonymous purchasers. Rumor and myth abound regarding the location of the diamonds.

The Excelsior diamond was the focal point of the 2003 Victoria's Secret Fantasy Bra valued at approximately $13 million with a jeweled panty for additional $1 million.

=== The Cullinan diamond ===
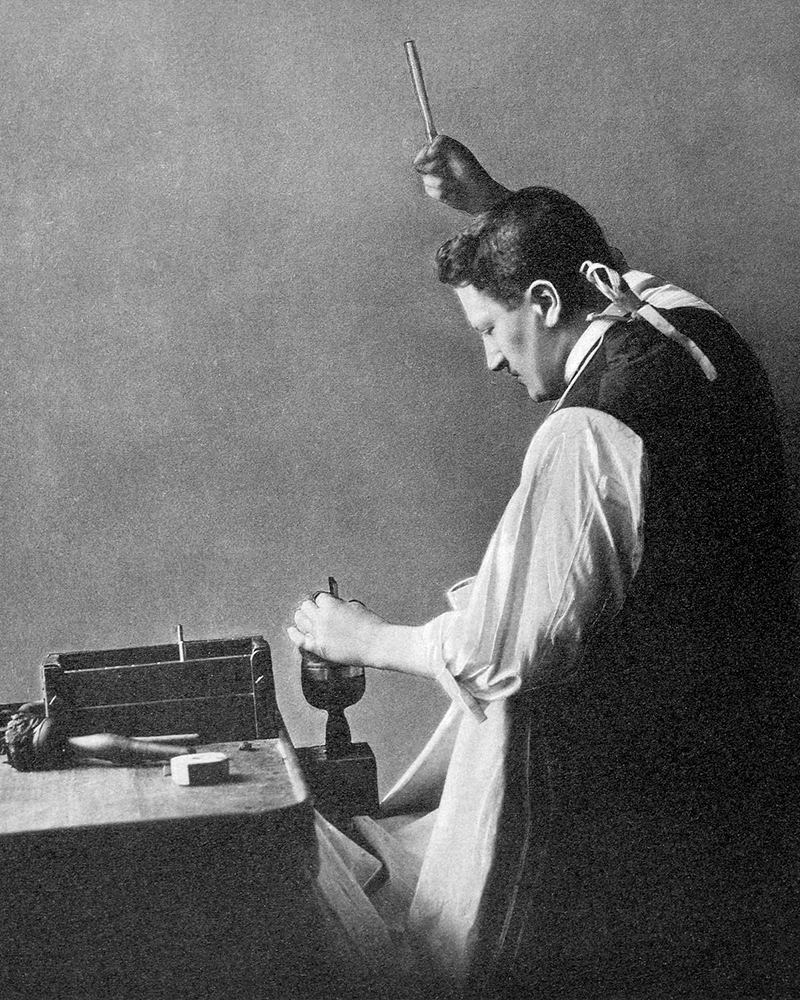
Joseph Asscher splitting the Cullinian diamond

In 1905 the Cullinan diamond was discovered. At 3,106 carats (621.2 g) it was a legendary find, and achieved instant renown across the globe. The diamond was presented to King Edward VII, and he invited the Asscher brothers to London to discuss cleaving the diamond. It was decided that Joseph Asscher would cleave the Cullinan into three parts, necessitated by inclusions within the rough diamond. Nine large stones were cut from it, the largest being the Cullinan I at 530.20 carats (106.040 g).

In February 1908 an audience gathered to watch Joseph Asscher cleave the huge stone. In order to yield large, beautiful diamonds he needed to hit the Cullinan in exactly the right place. On his first strike his blade broke, while the stone remained intact. He dismissed all present and set to work creating larger, stronger tools. The following week, armed with new tools, Joseph resumed his work, allowing no one but the notary public in the cutting room. Urban legend recounts that Joseph fainted after striking the Cullinan diamond with a tremendous blow. He later commented that the adrenaline surging through him the moment the stone split was so strong all he could think to do was to examine the stone and check his workmanship over and over again before rushing to the next room to share the good news. Later, the Cullinan diamonds were polished, becoming part of the Crown Jewels of the United Kingdom.

=== World War II ===
During the battle of the Netherlands in World War II, the Nazis, as part of their extermination plans, entered the Asscher Diamond Company's Amsterdam headquarters and seized its diamonds. Since the Asscher family were Jewish, they were deported from the Netherlands and interned in Nazi concentration camps along with nearly all of the company's 500 master polishers. Most of the Asscher family and over 96 percent of the polishers were murdered by the Nazis, with only ten Asscher family members and fifteen of the five hundred polishers surviving.

During the war the patent on the original Asscher cut expired. With no one to renew the patent, other companies started to utilize the Asscher cut, leading to market confusion about the origin of many Asscher cut diamonds. Some companies chose to call their Asscher cut diamonds square-emerald cuts instead. Many of these diamonds were cut for yield and did not necessarily follow Joseph Asscher's original proportion calculations for the Asscher cut, which specified parameters for the diamond's crown height, table size, and facet alignment. Although once the world's diamond polishing capital, the diamond industry in Amsterdam was virtually wiped out during the war, including the Asscher Diamond Company. Antwerp subsequently emerged as a major diamond polishing center.

In 1946 Joop and Louis Asscher were invited to start a new company in New York, but they chose to remain in their home of Amsterdam and rebuild the Asscher Diamond Company. During the 1950s and 1960s the company began exploring new markets and became a prominent diamantaire in Japan.

== Awards and recognition ==
In 1980 Her Majesty Queen Juliana of the Netherlands granted the Asscher Diamond Company a royal title in tribute to the leading, century-old role the company and Asscher family held in the diamond industry. With this honor, the Asscher Diamond Company became the Royal Asscher Diamond Company.

== Current administration ==
The fifth and sixth generations of the Asscher family remain active in the business. Edward Asscher worked in conjunction with daughter Lita and son Mike until his retirement in March 2020. With his departure, Lita and Mike became co-presidents of the firm. In 2024, the company employs 100 workers around the world. Important stones are cut in Amsterdam, while smaller ones are sent to India.

== Architecture ==
Designed by Architect Gerrit Van Arkel, the castle-like structure of the original Asscher factory is considered a jewel of Amsterdam's De Pijp area. To provide ample light for working on the diamonds, the factory had huge windows. A police station was established outside. At one time over 500 diamond polishers worked in the building. Some of the largest and most iconic diamonds in the world were cut and polished here. Tolstraat 127 became known as the Diamantbuurt (Diamond District), with street names such as Diamantstraat (Diamond Street), Robijnstraat (Ruby Street), Saffierstraat (Sapphire Street) and Smaragdstraat (Emerald Street). The area is now known as the "Asscher Quarter" and the old factory is a luxury apartment complex. The main tower has remained Royal Asscher's headquarters.

In 2017, a renewal project repurposed the Asscher diamond factory and the Nieuwer-Amstel into luxury flats to create the new high-end zone Asscherkwartier.

== In the popular culture ==
In a 2006 episode of Antiques Roadshow (S25-E24), a school teacher brought an Asscher-cut diamond to the show that was estimated between $75K to $100K.

When Aidan Shaw proposes to Carrie Bradshaw in Sex and the City, he does so with a Harry Winston 3-carat Asscher-cut diamond ring.
