= Abraham Asscher =

Dutch Jewish businessman and politician (1880–1950)

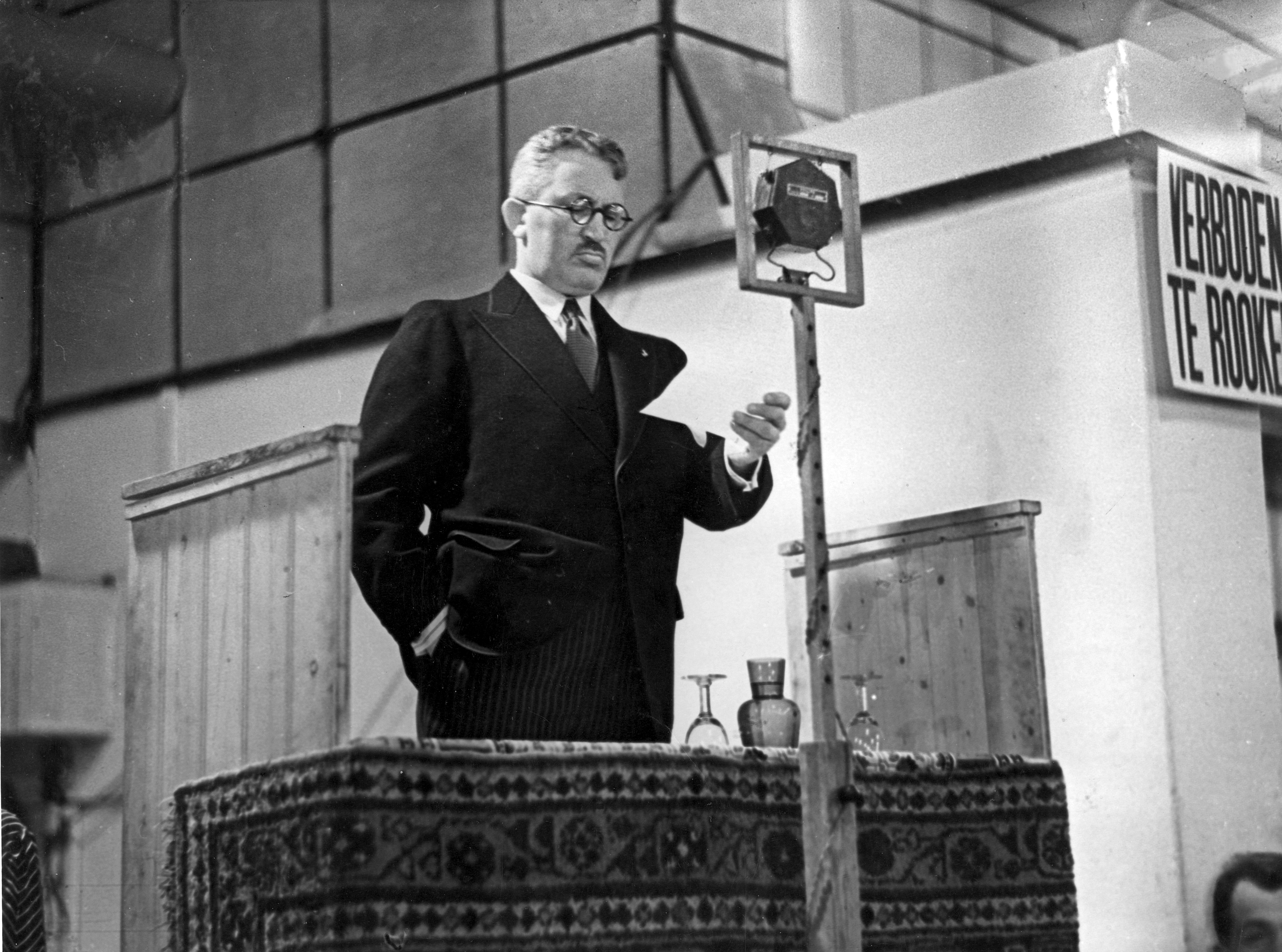
- Abraham Asscher (March 1933)
- Born: 19 September 1880; Amsterdam
- Died: 2 May 1950 (aged 69)
- Relatives: Lodewijk Asscher (great-grandson)

Abraham Asscher (19 September 1880 – 2 May 1950) was a Dutch Jewish businessman from Amsterdam, a politician, and a leader of his community who attained notoriety for his role during the German occupation of the Netherlands (1940–1945).

== Early career ==
Asscher's grandfather founded the Asscher Diamond Company (now the Royal Asscher Diamond Company) in 1854, but it was Abraham and his brother Joseph who built its international fame. In 1907 the brothers opened a new factory at 127 Tolstraat in Amsterdam and soon they received a request from King Edward VII of the United Kingdom to cleave the legendary Cullinan Diamond, the largest rough gem-quality diamond ever found.

== Public service ==
Asscher translated his growing success in business into political and community involvement. In 1917, he took up a seat on the Provincial Council of North Holland for the Liberale Staatspartij (Liberal State Party). And in the 1930s, he became a leader and spokesman of the Dutch Jewish community. He served as the president of the nation's central Jewish organization, the Nederlandsch-Israëlitisch Kerkgenootschap (Dutch Jewish Congregation).

Therefore, when in 1933 Jewish refugees began to flee in numbers to the Netherlands from the Nazi regime in Germany, it was Asscher, along with Professor David Cohen, who established (with government cooperation) the Comité voor Bijzondere Joodsche Belangen (Committee for Special Jewish Affairs - CBJB). An offshoot of the CBJB, the Comité voor Joodsche Vluchtelingen (Committee for Jewish Refugees - CJV), was formed to provide direct service to the refugees. The CJV provided advice and, as needed, financial support to the refugees, and worked to facilitate the emigration of refugees away from continental Europe. David Cohen was the chair of the CJV for most of its eight years of existence. Both of these committees were dissolved by Germany in 1941, and their responsibilities transferred to a Jewish Council.

== The Jewish Council ==
It was in this context (see Netherlands in World War II) that the Nazi occupiers later, on 12 February 1941, ordered Asscher and Cohen to head up a new Jewish Council of Amsterdam (Joodse Raad, or Judenrat, of Amsterdam); the only example of a Jewish Council in the German occupations of Western Europe. The first meeting was held at the Asscher Brothers headquarters in Tolstraat. The Jewish Council had to mediate the occupying government's orders to the Dutch Jewish community of Amsterdam and, beginning in July 1942, to help organize the selection of Jewish deportees from the Netherlands to the work camps.

In September 1943, most of the remaining staff of the Jewish Council, including Asscher were deported. Asscher, like most deported Dutch Jews, initially went to the Westerbork transit camp in the Drenthe province in the east of the country. From there, the Nazis transported him to the Bergen-Belsen concentration camp.

== Postwar ==
Asscher survived his imprisonment at Bergen-Belsen and returned to Amsterdam after the conclusion of the war. Aside from historian David Cohen, who also survived Theresienstadt concentration camp, and Arnold van den Bergh, all other members of the Jewish Council perished, including the Chief Rabbi of Amsterdam Lodewijk Sarlouis. The Dutch government instituted investigations against Asscher and his colleague David Cohen into charges of collaboration. A Joodsche Eereraad (Jewish Council of Honor or Community Tribunal) was also established to investigate wartime collaboration charges on behalf of the Jewish community. It was particularly concerned with activity after 15 August 1942, a point from which, according to the accusers' post-war perspective, it was considered obvious that the Joodse Raad was assisting in a mass-murder of Dutch Jews in German-occupied Poland's Nazi extermination camps. However, what was obvious to either Jews or non-Jews in the Netherlands at the time is a matter of considerable historical controversy. The Nazi occupiers went to great lengths to conceal the fate of deported Jews from the Dutch population, including Dutch Jews and the Joodse Raad.

In 1947 the Council of Honor ruled to exclude Asscher and Cohen from ever holding public office in the Dutch Jewish Community. By then, Asscher—deeply wounded by what he saw as unjust charges leveled against him—had left the Community. When Asscher died in 1950 in accordance with his wishes he was not buried in a Jewish cemetery, but instead at the Zorgvlied cemetery. However, in the same year, due to constant protests and appeals, the Jewish community tribunal after reconsidering the charges reversed and annulled its decree to exclude both Asscher and Cohen from official posts in the Jewish community, exonerating them completely. The Dutch government, taking its cue from the Jewish community, dropped all charges of its own the year following. Abraham Asscher has been officially exonerated of all charges, even if it came too late for him to know about it.

== Legacy ==
The actions of Asscher and the Joodse Raad during the German occupation were and are a controversial topic. Hans Knoop, in his history of the Joodse Raad, came to this conclusion:

"They issued deportation notices and urged the Jews in Het Joodsche Weekblad to obey these summons to the letter ... Cohen declared after the war that 'thanks to our efforts no Jew suffered from hunger in occupied Holland.' That is the case. But thanks to Asscher and Cohen the deportation of the Jews in the Netherlands achieved a greater measure of perfection and efficiency than anywhere else in occupied Europe."

Of course, such accusations benefit from a hindsight that the leaders of the Jewish Council in The Netherlands did not have. Jacob Presser's groundbreaking history of the Holocaust in the Netherlands, Ondergang (lit. Destruction; published in English as The Destruction of Dutch Jews, or Ashes in the Wind: The Destruction of Dutch Jews), also criticized Asscher and Cohen, while balancing this with a defense of their good intentions and courageous attempts within the realities of their own perceived situation, to lessen Nazi measures. Presser stated firmly that: "No one has accused the two Presidents and the Jewish Council" of being collaborators in the strict sense of being "corrupt and immoral willing tools" of the Nazis, much less as partisans for them, as were the Dutch Nazis, Quislings, Petains and Francos, but the accusations after the war rather were about the degree to which they as victims had naively or mistakenly, despite their best efforts to preserve as much as they could, conceded too much to Nazi pressures to collect together and help to transport the Jewish community to unknown destinations in "the East." Presser, acknowledging that they sought to preserve as many as possible of the Jewish community by haggling numbers deported down as far as possible, even adds,"The Jewish Council played for time. Was that wrong? ... Even the most unselfish people would surely have hesitated to shelter and hide Jews if they had known that their self-sacrifice would drag out over so many long years. And it has been said that had the war in fact ended in 1942 the Jewish community would have built a monument to Asscher and Cohen, as the brave and resourceful leaders by whose hands Dutch Jewry was saved."

Leni Yahil, in her The Holocaust: The Fate of European Jewry, writes sympathetically of them: "While Visser's opposition to cooperation [of any kind whatsoever] with the Germans bespoke a political orientation," (he had led a rival Jewish "Coordination Committee" that the Nazis had disbanded, which had urged that the Jewish community resist any cooperation with the Nazis and only address itself to the Dutch government, which, according to Yahil "ignored the fact that the heads of the Dutch administration were now carrying out orders issued by the Germans"), "Asscher and especially Cohen invoked the humanitarian principle and believed it was necessary to negotiate with the Germans in order to mitigate the suffering of the Jews through intercession on their behalf. Thus, they essentially held to the approach that had been employed prior to the war to obtain aid for the refugees, except that now they were tending to the Jewish community as a whole."

In 1980, the company that Asscher and his brother had brought to international fame and prominence was awarded the Royal title by Queen Juliana of the Netherlands; it is now known as the Royal Asscher Diamond Company (Koninklijke Asscher Diamant Maatschappij. Abraham's grandson, Edward Asscher, is the current president of the company. His great-grandson Lodewijk Asscher was the Dutch Minister of Social Affairs and Employment until 2017.
