= Joan Stiebel =

Joan Valentine Stiebel MBE (23 April 1911 – 25 January 2007) was a relief worker in England, from before the Second World War. She was posthumously recognised as a British Hero of the Holocaust.

Joan Stiebel was born on 23 April 1911 in Walton-on-Thames, Surrey, England. The daughter of Christian parents, Ernest Arthur Stiebel and Valentine Evelyn Mary Amelia Pender, she became increasingly active in Jewish affairs after becoming a secretary to Otto Schiff, in 1933. In 1939, after Schiff and others had formed what today is called World Jewish Relief, Stiebel was appointed to that organisation full-time.

After the end of World War II, Stiebel was responsible for making travel arrangements to bring 1,000 underaged Jewish Nazi concentration camp orphans to the United Kingdom. The children came to be known in the press as 'the Boys', and her involvement with them continued throughout her lifetime. She was also instrumental in the formation of Jewish Child's Day in 1947.

In 1958 she was appointed as the United Kingdom-based joint secretary of World Jewish Relief. She was appointed Member of the Order of the British Empire in 1978 for her lifetime of service to Jewish refugees. After retiring from World Jewish Relief in 1979, she was recruited by the Wiener Library to assist in establishing their Endowment Fund. She continued this pro bono work until her permanent retirement in 1989.

Stiebel died in London on 25 January 2007. In May 2019, the British Government honoured Stiebel with the British Hero of the Holocaust award.
