= Otto Schiff (humanitarian) =

Otto Moritz Schiff CBE (8 May 1875 in Frankfurt – 15 November 1952 in London) was a British Jewish banker and philanthropist. For his work with refugees and for public services, he successively received the OBE (1920), MBE (1924) and CBE (1939). He was posthumously recognised as a British Hero of the Holocaust.

== Life and activity ==
Otto Schiff was the son of a banker and a nephew of Jacob Schiff (1847–1920), a German-born New York investment banker. In 1896, at the age of twenty-one, he immigrated to London, where he became a partner in the merchant banking firm Bourke, Schiff and Co. His younger brother Ernst followed. Together, in the First World War, the brothers ran shelters for Belgian refugees. Ernst Schiff received an MBE as manager of the Poland Street Refuge for Belgian Refugees in 1918.

From 1927 to 1948, Schiff was president of the Jews' Temporary Shelter in City of London. This originally served as the first port of call for Jews from Eastern Europe who fled from there to Great Britain to avoid political persecution by the Russian Tsarist regime and later by the Bolsheviks.

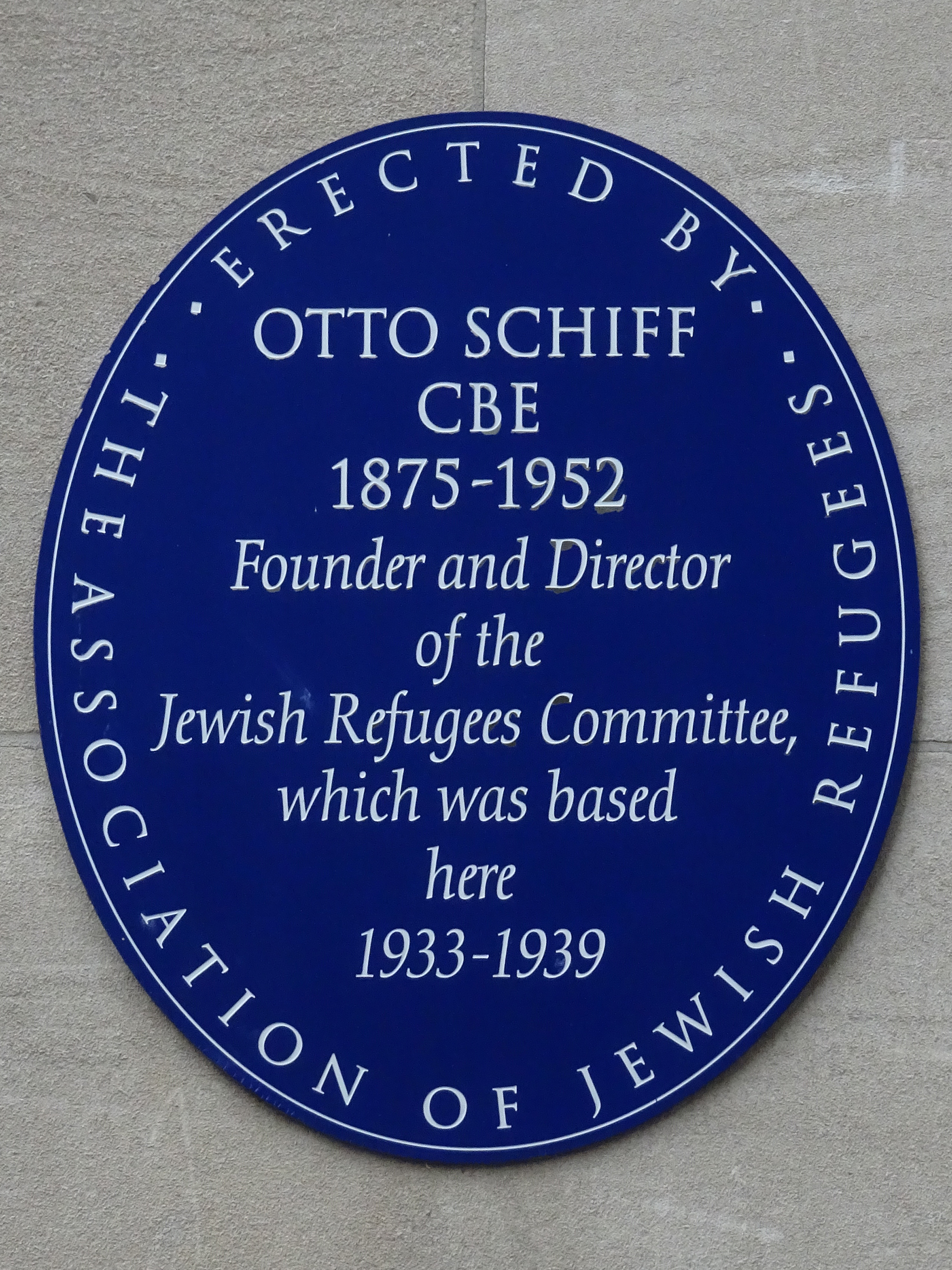
Blue plaque erected in 2019 by the Association of Jewish Refugees at 20 Tavistock Square, London

From 1933 Schiff served as chairman of the Jewish Refugees Committee, which was created in March of that year (German-Jewish Aid Committee from 1938, operating under the original name again from 1939). He helped numerous Jewish refugees to settle in Britain. He convinced the British government to allow the entry of Jewish refugees in return for the assurance that any costs would not be borne by the state, but would be borne by the Jewish communities and organizations.

In 1920 Otto Schiff became a Member of the Order of the British Empire for his work with war refugees. In 1924 he became an Officer of the Order of the British Empire for public services. He, as chairman of the German Jewish Aid Committee, became a Commander of the Order of the British Empire in the 1939 Birthday Honours.

In 1940, Schiff was placed on 'the Black Book' (Sonderfahndungsliste G.B. "Special Search List Great Britain"), a list of 2,820 persons who were to be arrested by the SS in the event of a German occupation of Britain.

In 2018 Schiff was posthumously awarded the medal of a British Hero of the Holocaust.

== See also ==
- Belgian refugees in Britain during the First World War
- Jewish refugees from German-occupied Europe in the United Kingdom
- Joan Stiebel
- MS St. Louis
