= Tolstraat =

Street in Amsterdam

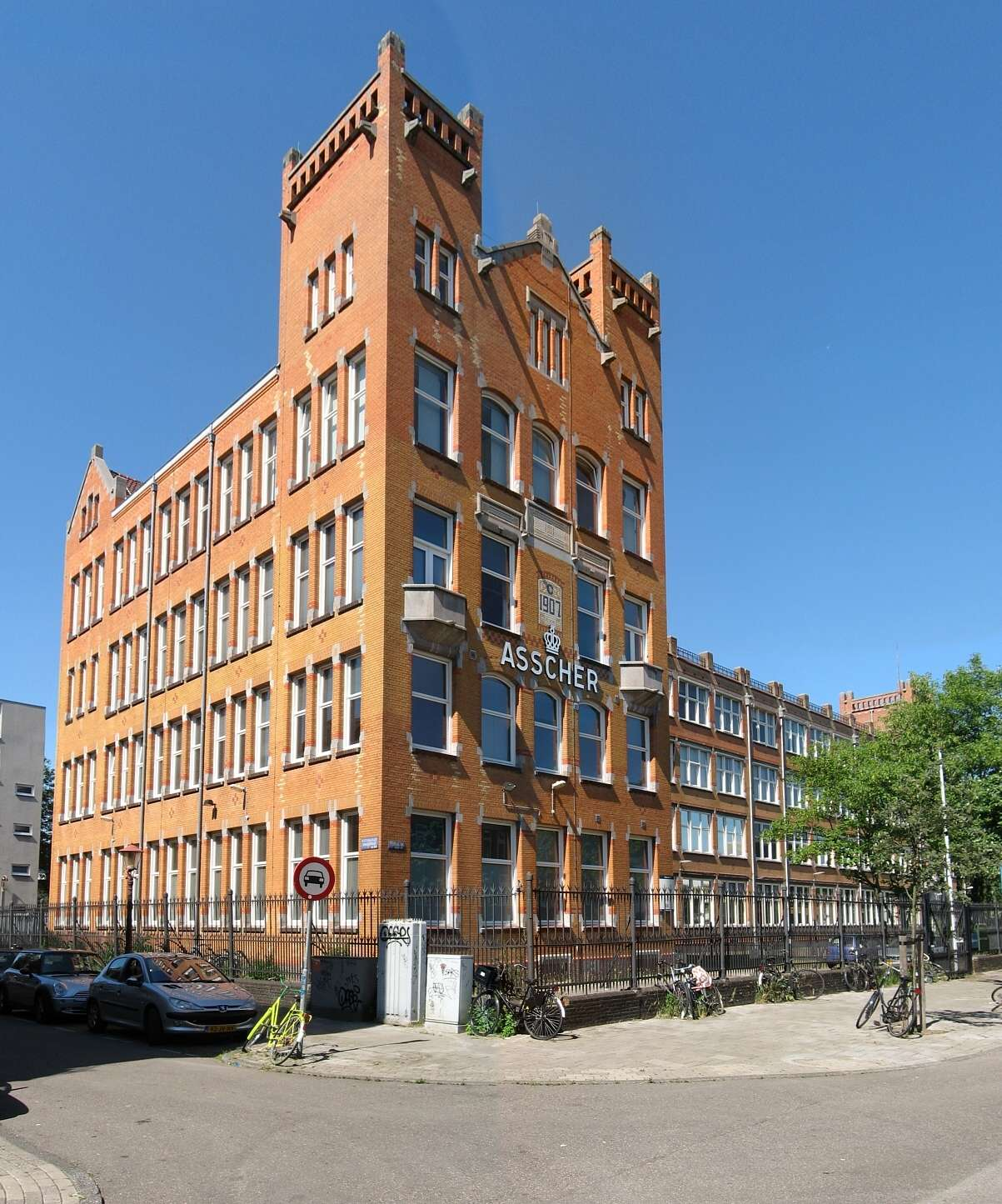
- Former names: Verversstraat and Ververspad until 1896
- Namesake: A toll house that stood at its East end.
- Length: 610 m (2,000 ft)
- Location: De Pijp neighborhood, Amsterdam
- Postal code: 10
- Nearest metro station: De Pijp metro station. Serviced also by tram 4 in Van Woustraat, Lutmastraat stop
- Coordinates: 52.368282°N 4.892788°E
- East end: Amsteldijk
- To: Henrick de Keijserplein

Tolstraat is a street in the De Pijp neighborhood in Amsterdam. The street runs from Henrick de Keijserplein to Amsteldijk and crosses Van Woustraat approximately halfway.

Tolstraat was known as Verversstraat and Ververspad until 1896. It derives its name from a toll gate that was located at its end by the Amstel. After this part of the municipality of Nieuwer-Amstel was annexed by Amsterdam in 1896, the toll gate was relocated, and the street received its current name to avoid confusion with the already existing Verversstraat in Amsterdam.

== Landmarks ==
The diamond cutting factory Asscher is located on Tolstraat. The factory building, dating from 1907, was designed by the architect Gerrit van Arkel (1858-1919) and is still partially used by the diamond cutting factory. From 1983 to 1997, the NINT (Dutch Institute for Natural Sciences and Technology) was housed in this building.

On the corner of Tolstraat and Amsteldijk stands the former town hall of Nieuwer-Amstel, which housed the Amsterdam City Archives from 1914 to 2007. Currently, the building houses Hotel Pestana, a luxury hotel.

Facing the Asscher building is a structure constructed in 1926 as a temple for the Theosophical Society. Designed by Leendert van der Vlugt, it is considered a prime example of New Objectivity architecture, an art movement opposed to expressionism. It was used as a cinema from 1942 until 1979, under the names Thalia, Cultura and Cinétol. The conversion to cinema was carried out under the direction of A.J. Westerman. Today the building serves as a branch of the OBA public library.

To the right of the public library is the current headquarters of the Theosophical Society in the Netherlands.

On the street's western end, near the corner with Pieter Aertszstraat, stands the housing complex Tolstraat 21-53 by Hendrik Petrus Berlage and Jop van Epen. Perpendicular to the street is the De Dageraad complex, on Toldwarsstraat 1-7, also designed by these two architects in collaboration with J.W.F. Hartkamp.
