= Gerrit van Arkel =

Dutch architect (1858–1918)

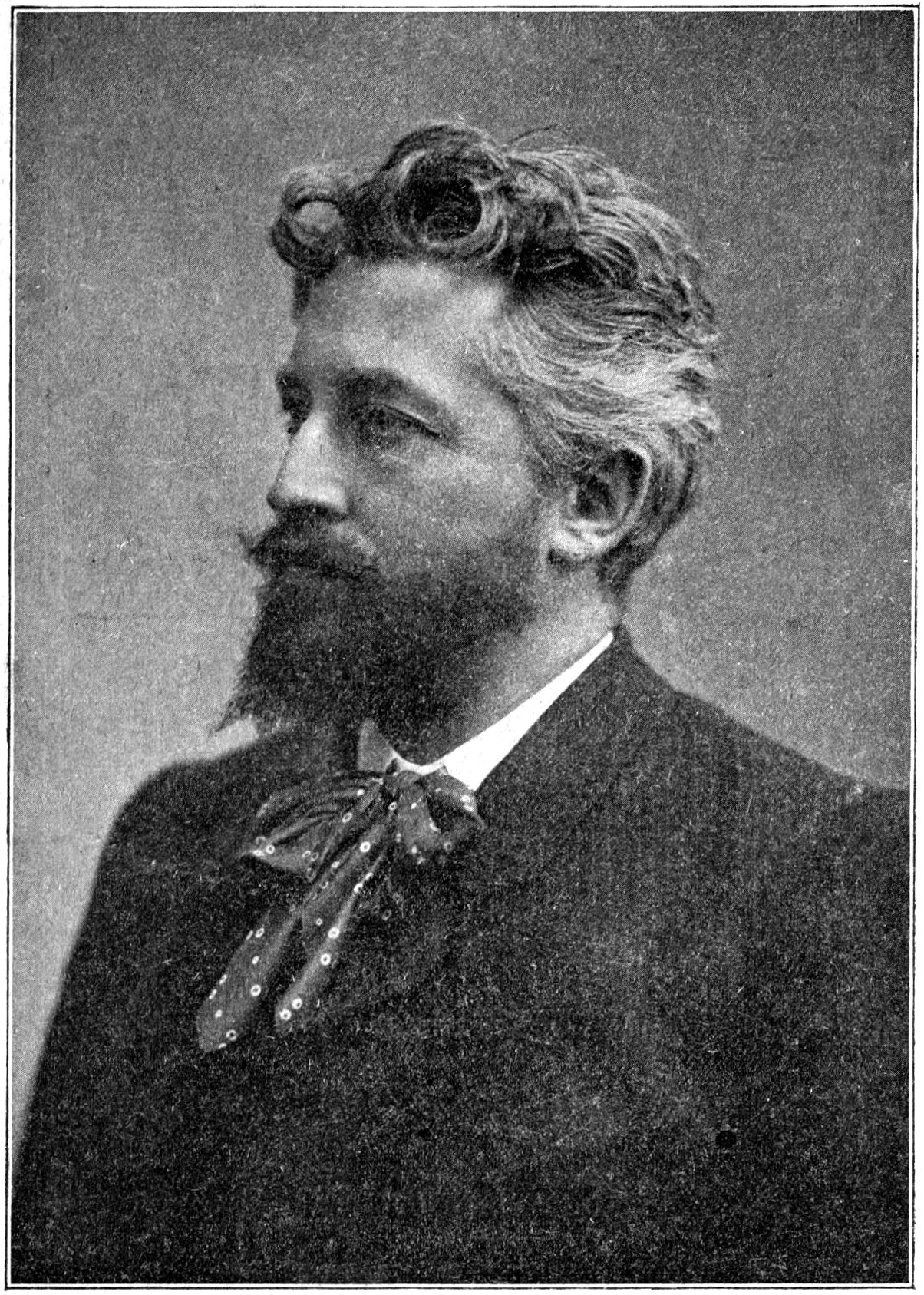
Gerrit van Arkel, 1906

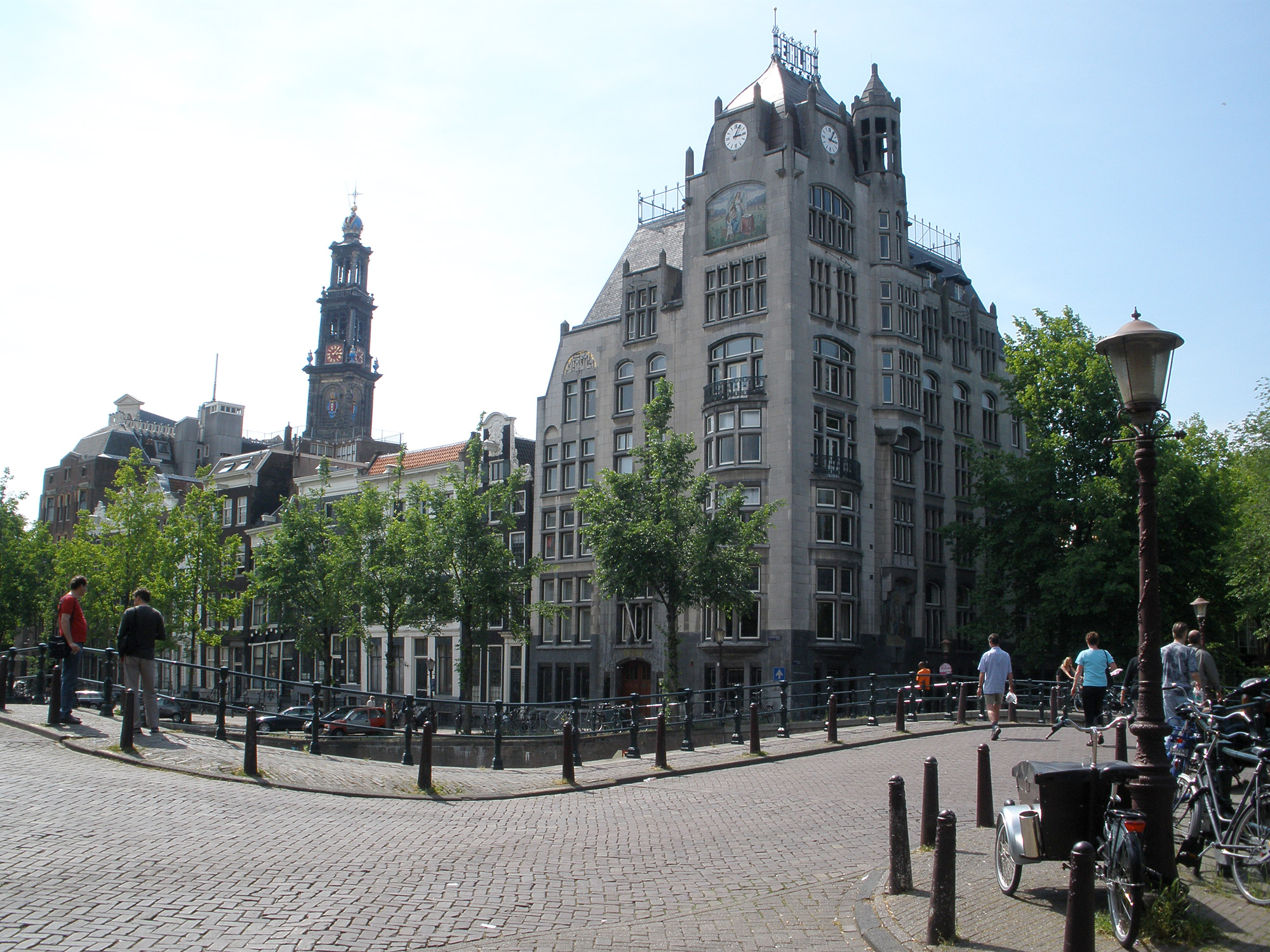
Astoria building, Keizersgracht 174-176 (1904/1905)

Gerrit A. van Arkel (3 April 1858 in Loenen aan de Vecht – 11 July 1918 in Abcoude) was a Dutch architect who designed many of Amsterdam's most prominent Jugendstil (Art Nouveau) buildings.

He moved to Amsterdam in 1883 to become an architect. His designs initially mixed Neo-Gothic and Neo-Renaissance styles but, from about 1894, he adopted a sobre version of Jugendstil (Art Nouveau). This sobre style of Jugendstil, influenced by the work of H. P. Berlage, was known as the Nieuwe Stijl ("New Style").

Van Arkel designs are characterized by the frequent use of bay windows and loggias, as well as asymmetrically placed balconies, towers and domes.

His design for the Helios building won third prize at the architectural competition of the 1900 World's Fair in Paris. Twelve of his buildings in Amsterdam were designated national monuments in 2001. The Asscher diamond factory has also been nominated for national monument status, and another 17 buildings in Amsterdam have been nominated to become municipal monuments.

== Buildings ==
Van Arkel's Jugendstil buildings in Amsterdam include:

- The Asscher diamond factory on Tolstraat (1907), where the world's largest diamond, the Cullinan Diamond, was cut
- The Diamond Exchange on Weesperplein square (1911)
- The Helios building on Spui square (1895/1896)
- The Astoria office building of the Eerste Hollandsche Levensverzekerings Bank on Keizersgracht canal (1904/1905)
- The office building of The Marine Insurance Company Limited on the Rokin (1901)
- The bakery of D.C. Stähle on Spuistraat (1898)
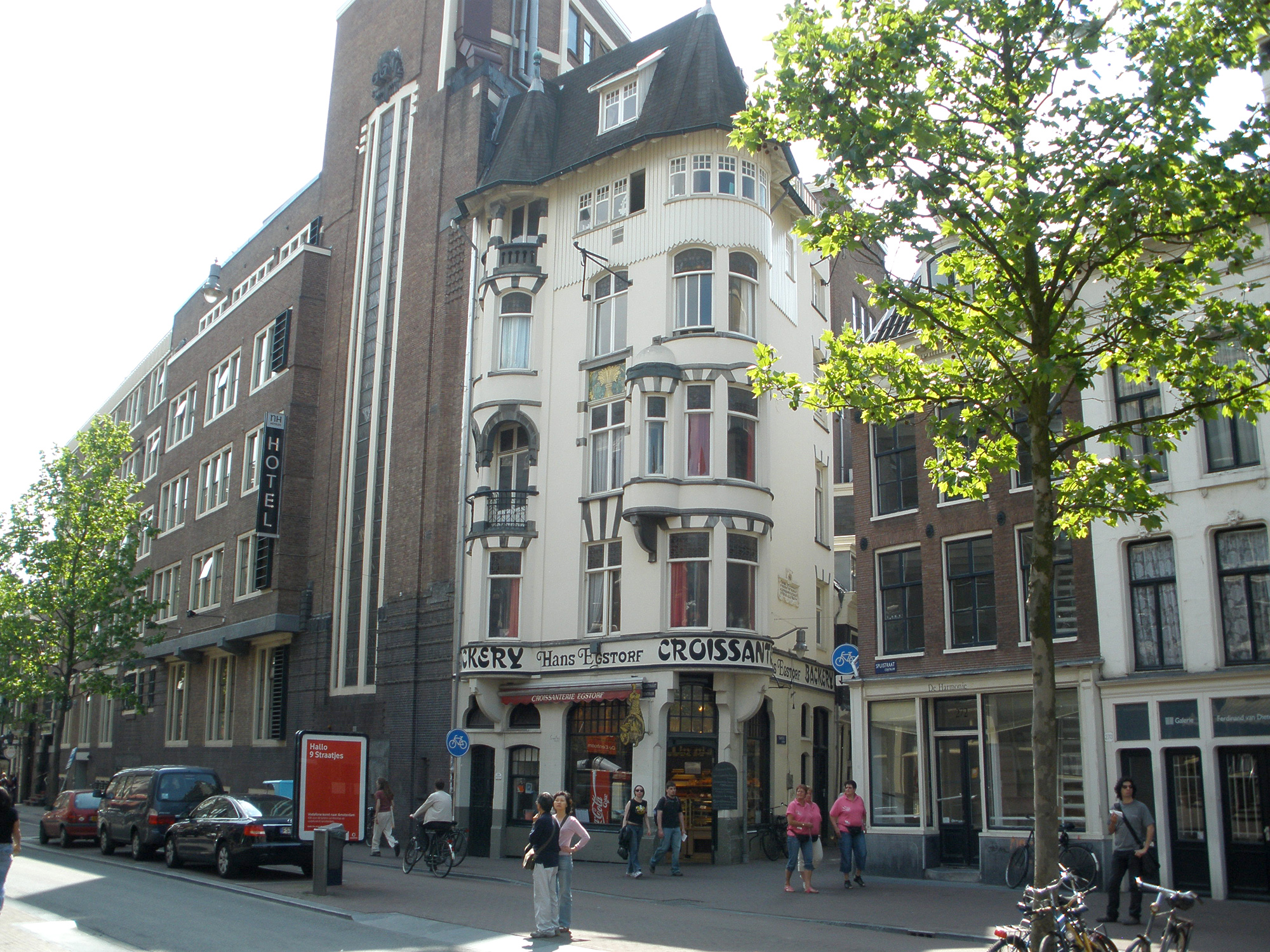
D.C. Stähle's bakery, Spuistraat (1898)

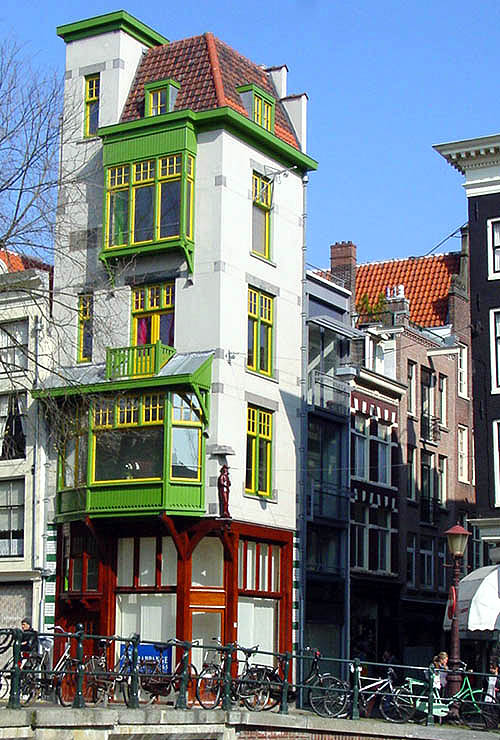
Gasthuismolensteeg 20 (1900)

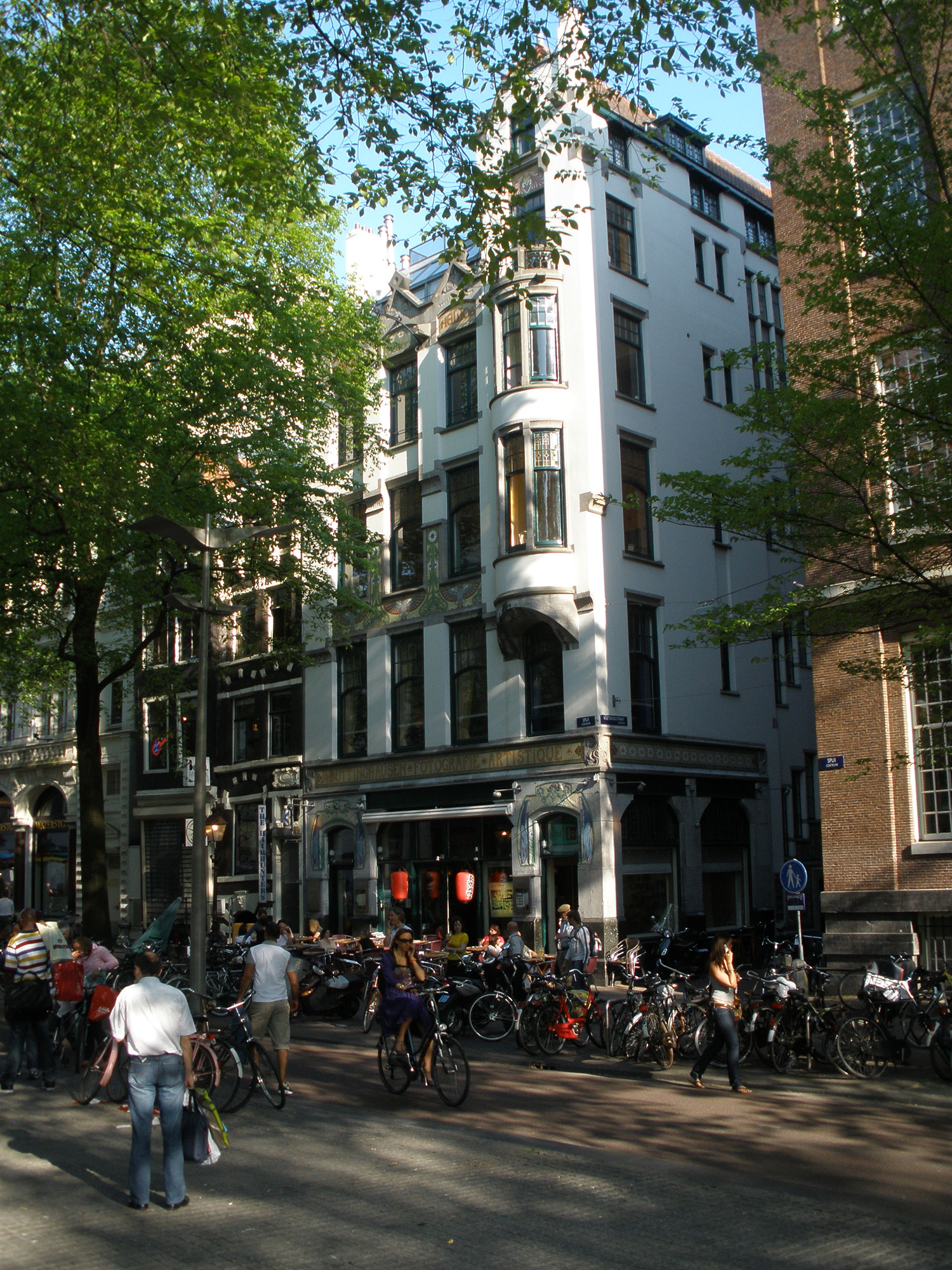
Helios building, Spui 15-19 (ca. 1900)

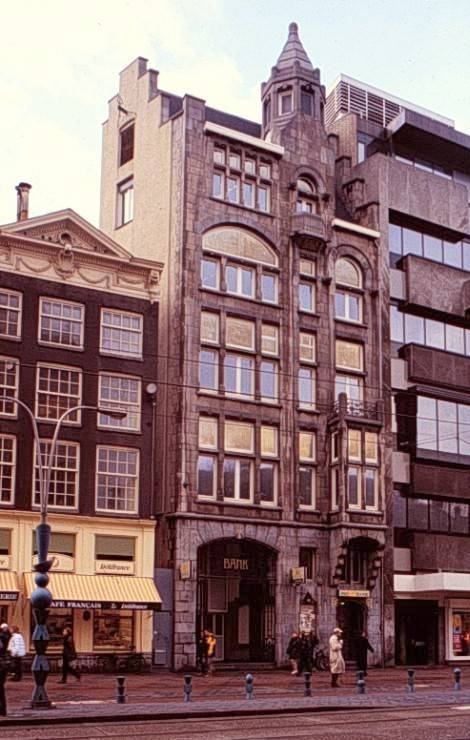
Damrak 80-81 (1904)

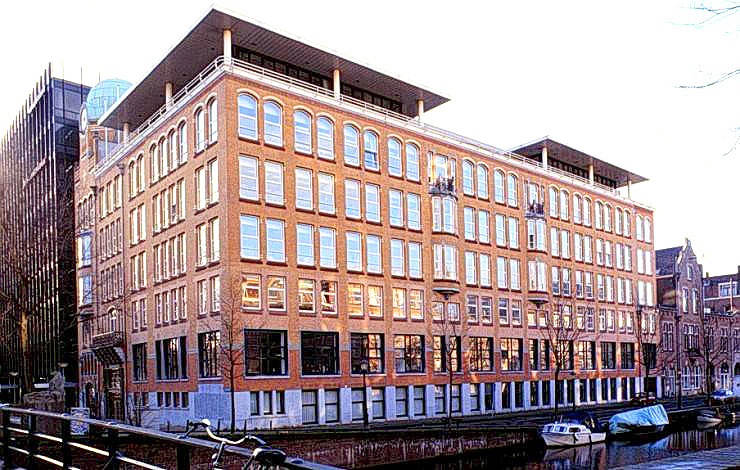
Diamond Exchange (1906)

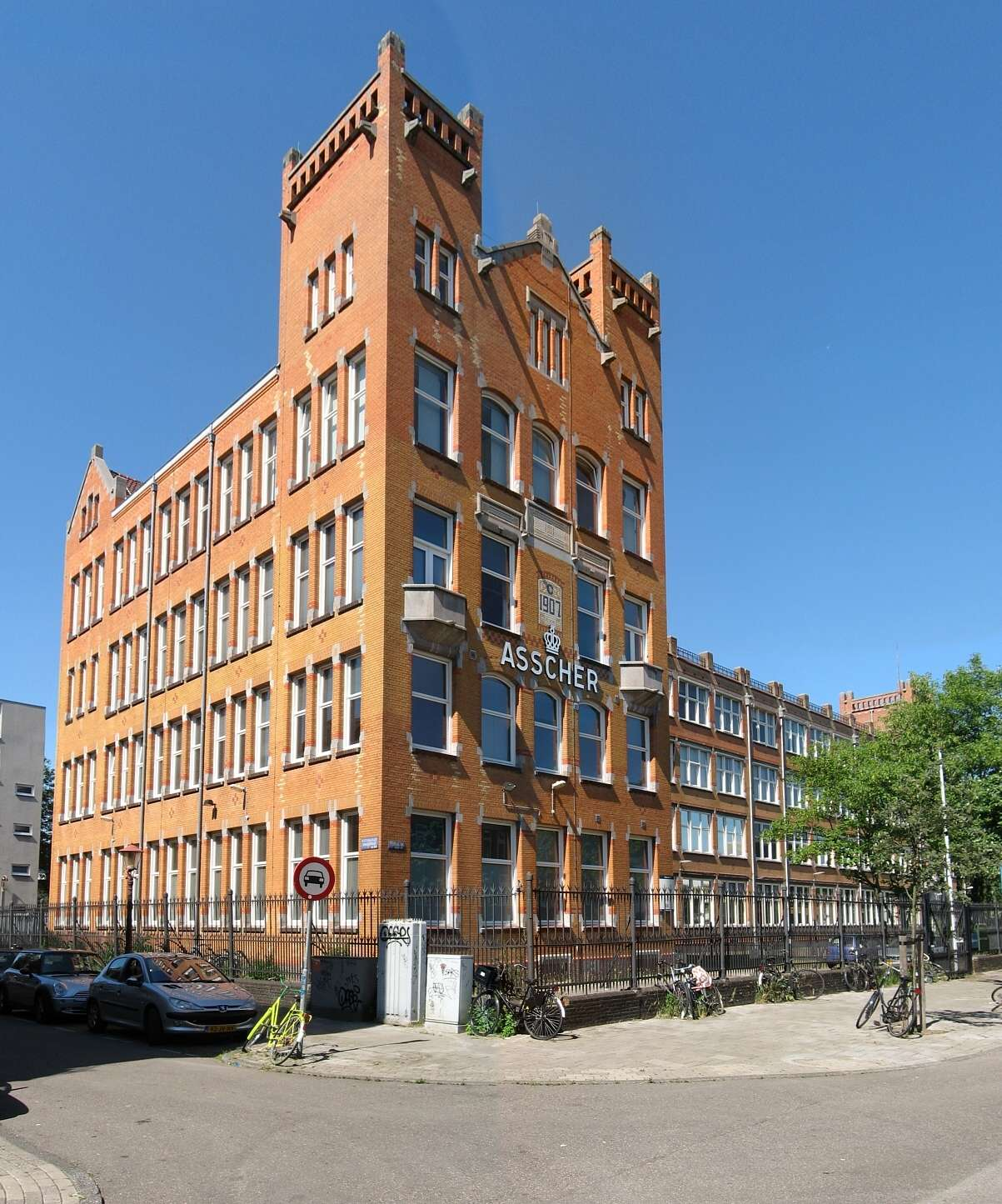
The Asscher diamond factory (1911)

== Sources ==
- Amsterdam Bureau of Monuments & Archeology (in Dutch)
- Jewish Historical Museum (in Dutch)
- Jaarboek van de Maatschappij der Nederlandse Letterkunde, 1919 (in Dutch)
