= David Cohen (historian) =

Dutch classicist and papyrologist (1882–1967)

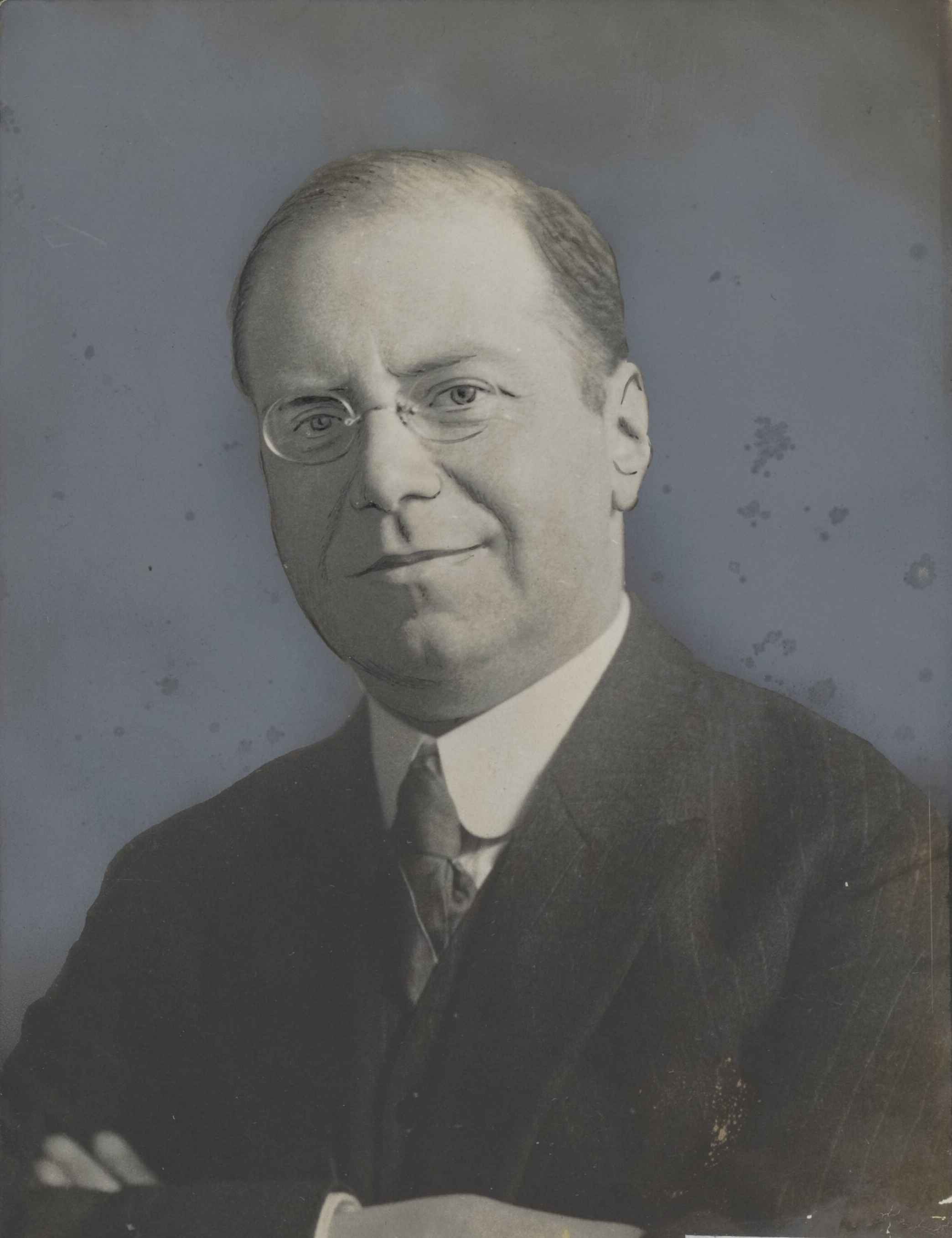
- Cohen in 1924
- Born: 31 December 1882; Deventer, Netherlands
- Died: 3 September 1967 (aged 84); Amsterdam, Netherlands
- Education: Leiden University
- Relatives: Josef Cohen (brother); Ru Cohen (brother); Virrie Cohen (daughter); Rob Oudkerk (grandson)

David Cohen (31 December 1882, Deventer – 3 September 1967, Amsterdam) was a Dutch classicist and papyrologist and one of the two chairs of the Jewish Council of Amsterdam (Joodse Raad, or Judenrat, of Amsterdam) during the occupation of the Netherlands in World War II. He was Professor of Ancient History at the University of Amsterdam and a prominent Zionist leader.

== Education and career until 1940 ==
Cohen was educated at Leiden University. He was a teacher in The Hague and became a private lecturer at the University of Leiden. In 1924 he became a professor by special appointment at the same university. Two years later he was appointed full professor of Ancient History at the Municipal University of Amsterdam. Cohen was one of the founders and editor of Hermeneus: Monthly Magazine for Ancient Culture, the first edition of which appeared in 1928.

== Second World War and after ==
In 1941 Cohen and Asscher were appointed by the German occupiers as chairs of the Jewish Council for Amsterdam. In September 1943, Cohen and Abraham Asscher were themselves arrested and taken to the Westerbork transit camp. Later they were deported from there, Cohen to the Theresienstadt concentration camp. There he survived the war.

After the war, the presidency of the Jewish Council was severely criticized. In 1947, the Jewish Honor Council forbade him to fulfill a position within the Jewish community; this decision was canceled in 1950. Cohen did, however, regain his professorship after the war at the University of Amsterdam, where he retired in 1953.

== Family ==
David Cohen was married to Cornelia (Corrie) Slijper (1881–1953) since 1912. He divorced her after the Second World War. Together they had three children, the architect Herman Cohen (1914–2005), who helped build the state of Israel from 1939 to 1967, nurse and resistance fighter Virrie Cohen (1916–2008) and Mirjam Cohen (1920–1990). One of David Cohen's grandchildren, son of daughter Virrie, is former doctor and former PvdA politician Rob Oudkerk. David was a brother of the well-known writer Josef Cohen.

== Literature ==
- David Cohen, Roaming and Wandering. The Jewish Refugees in the Netherlands in the Years 1933–1940. With an Introduction About the Years 1900–1933. Haarlem: De Erven F. Bohn NV, 1955.
- Piet Schrijvers, Rome, Athens, Jerusalem. Life and Work of Prof. Dr. David Cohen. Groningen: Historical Publisher, 2000, ISBN 9789065544711
- Herman Cohen, Jew in Palestine. Memories 1939–1948. Amsterdam: Meulenhoff, 1995, ISBN 9029050284
- Erik Somers, President of the Jewish Council. The Memories of David Cohen (1941–1943). Introduced and annotated by Erik Somers. Zutphen: Walburg Press, 2010, ISBN 9789057305368
