= Kitchener Camp =

Camp in Kent, England housing Jewish refugees from Nazi Germany

Kitchener Camp was a former military camp at Sandwich, Kent, used to house male Jewish refugees from Nazi Germany in the late 1930s.

Organised by the precursor of World Jewish Relief, around 4,000 mainly Austrian and German adult Jewish men received an arranged passage and were accepted for accommodation in the camp during 1939, on condition they would not be granted UK citizenship or work, and must emigrate to the US, Australia and elsewhere. At the start of the war, 887 volunteered for the Pioneer Corps. After the Dunkirk evacuation in May 1940, public opinion turned against German-speaking refugees, whom some suspected of being spies or saboteurs. Those not serving in the war effort were interned or deported to Australia and Canada and the camp was closed.

In April 2014, Kitchener Camp was the subject of an exhibition at the Wiener Library in London.
