= Old City Hall (Nieuwer-Amstel) =

Building in Amsterdam, Netherlands

Coordinates: 52°21′12″N 4°54′25″E

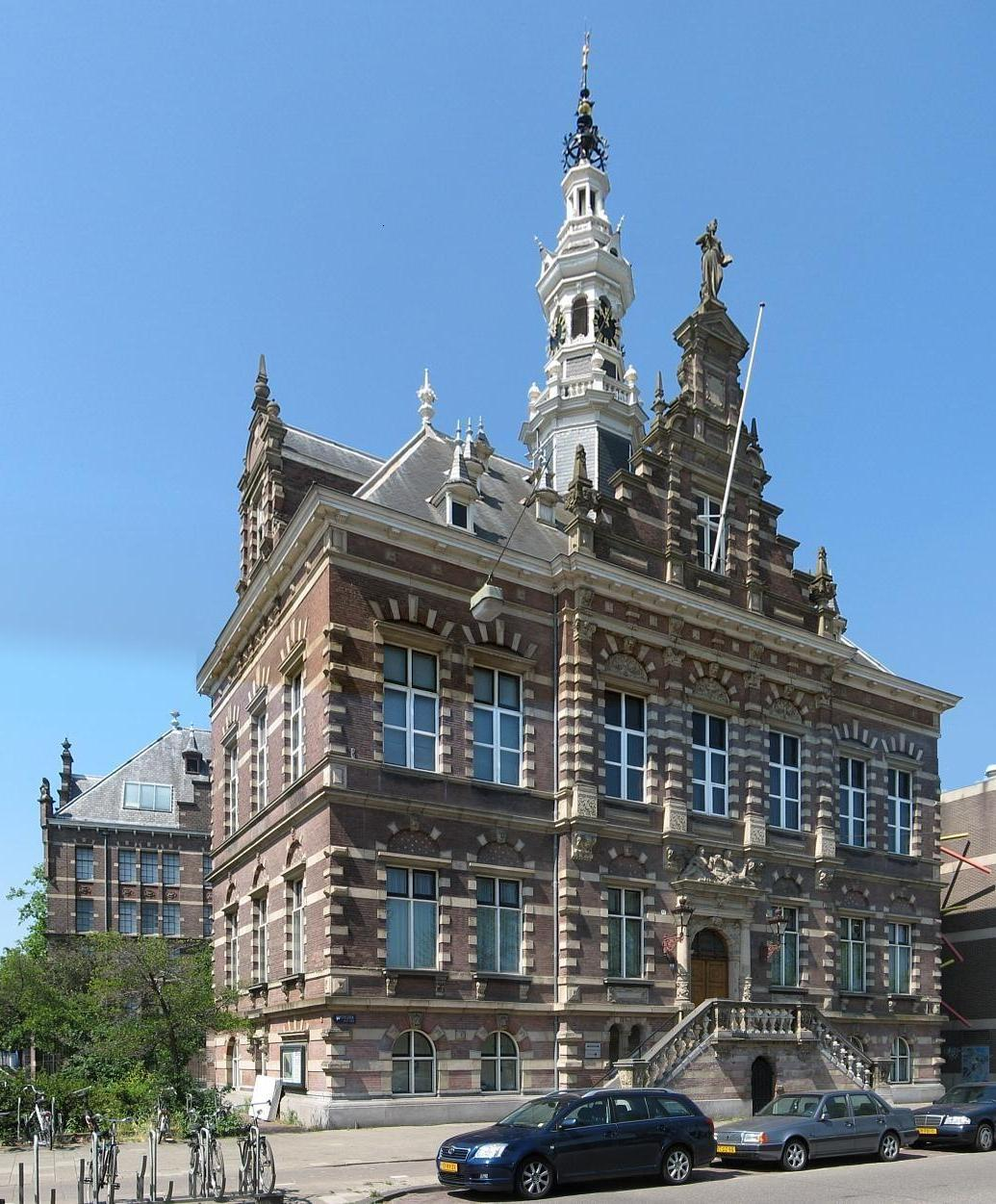
Old City Hall of Nieuwer-Amstel on the Amsteldijk 67, Amsterdam.

The City Hall in Nieuwer-Amstel is a Neo renaissance building built in 1889-1892 overlooking the Amstel. It was the seat of the city of Nieuwer-Amstel's government, but after absorption into the municipality of Amsterdam in 1896, it became a location for the Amsterdam City Archives in 1914.

== History ==
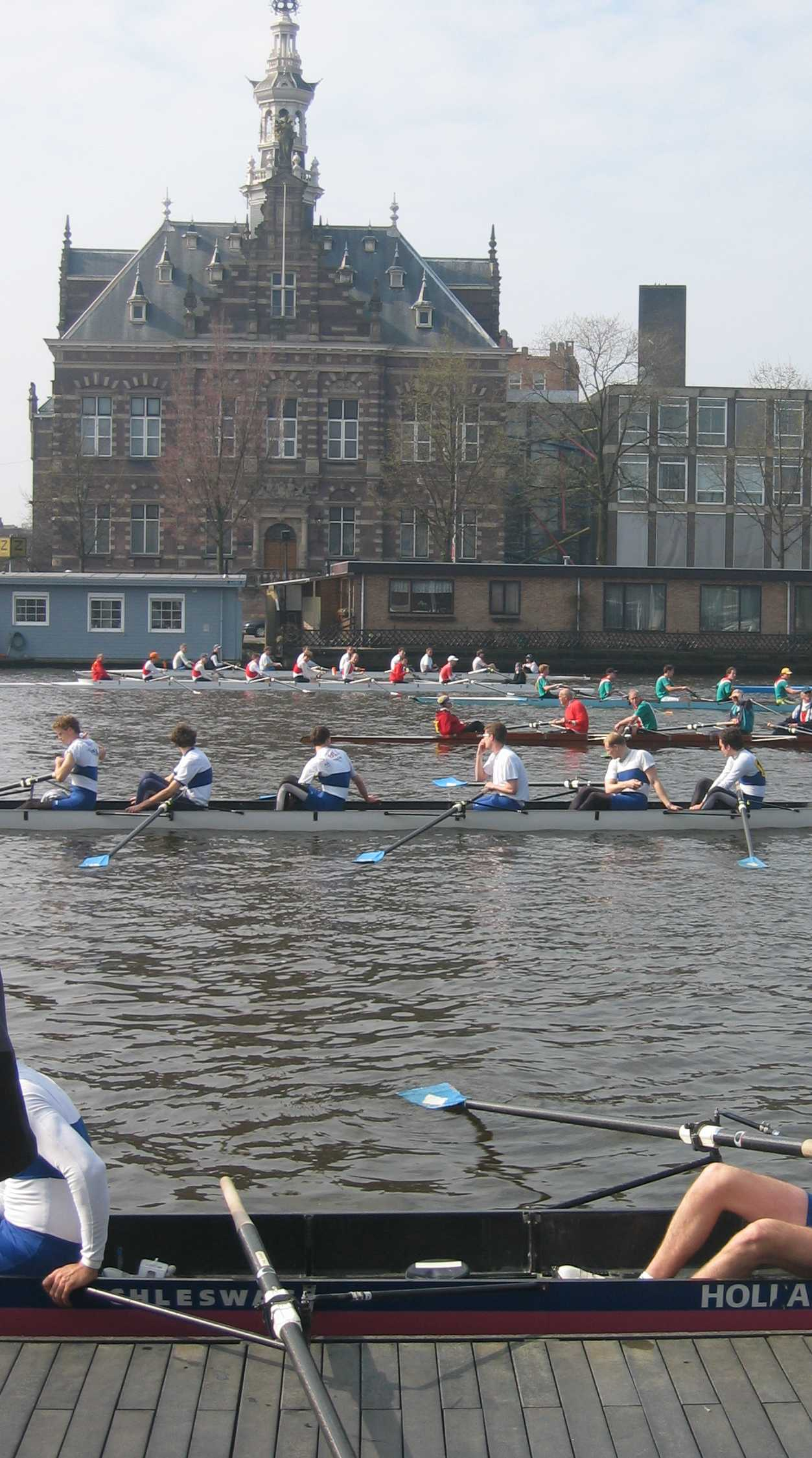
View across the Amstel from rowing club "De Hoop".

The town hall was built on the site of the former Bergenvaarderskamer, a guild hall for the Amsterdam shippers and merchants to Bergen, Norway. The sculptures on the front of the building above the doorway and at the top of the gable were made by Bart van Hove.
