= World Jewish Relief =

British Jewish charity

- The Central British Fund for World Jewish Relief
- Founded: 1933
- Type: International Development, Humanitarian Aid
- Registration no.: 290767
- Headquarters: London, England (UK)
- Region served: Worldwide
- Chair of Trustees: Maurice Helfgott
- Chief Executive: Paul Anticoni
- President: Henry Grunwald
- Website: www.worldjewishrelief.org
- Formerly called: The Central British Fund for German Jewry (1933–1995)

The Central British Fund for World Jewish Relief, formerly Central British Fund for German Jewry, (CBF) which currently operates under the name World Jewish Relief (WJR), is a British charitable organisation and the main Jewish overseas aid organisation in the United Kingdom. The charity's patron is King Charles III.

From 1933 the organisation helped Jewish refugees from Europe emigrate and settle in the UK and Palestine. Israel's first president, Chaim Weizmann was one of the organisation's founding members.

Today, World Jewish Relief is the UK Jewish community’s humanitarian and development agency. The charity assists vulnerable people in 21 countries across Europe, Asia, Africa and South America. Its programmes focus on tackling poverty, supporting refugees into employment, and responding to international disasters. It works with Jewish and non-Jewish communities.

World Jewish Relief was formed in 1933 to support German Jews under Nazi rule and helped organise the Kindertransport which rescued around 10,000 German and Austrian children from Nazi Europe.

After the war, the organisation brought 732 child Holocaust survivors to Britain; the first 300 are known as the Windermere Children and collectively they are known as 'the boys'.

== Founding and beginning operations ==
World Jewish Relief was originally called the Central British Fund for German Jewry (CBF) and was founded in 1933. CBF was founded following a meeting of UK Jewish community leaders with Members of Parliament. The meeting was the initiative of Neville Laski and Leonard Montefiore, president of the Anglo-Jewish Association.

Laski and Montefiore were co-chairmen of the Joint Foreign Committee, which pooled the Board of Deputies and the Anglo-Jewish Association's resources. Also involved was Otto Schiff who had emigrated to the UK in 1896 and rescued 12,000 Jews from Germany during the First World War. He received an OBE for his efforts to aid Belgians during the First World War.

Its founding members included Simon Marks, chairman and managing director of Marks & Spencer, Sir Robert Waley Cohen, managing director of Shell Oil, Lionel and Anthony de Rothschild, managing partners of N M Rothschild & Sons.

Notably, Chaim Weizmann, a Zionist who played an instrumental role in creating the Balfour Declaration, was one of the CBF's founders. Weizmann would later convince Harry Truman's administration to abandon its trusteeship plan for Palestine paving the way for America's recognition of Israel, and would eventually become its first president. Another leading member, Sir Osmond d'Avigdor-Goldsmid, felt that through the CBF, 'Jews of every shade of belief and political thought have united in their efforts to assist German Jewry'.

=== 1930s appeal ===
The CBF's first appeal appeared in The Jewish Chronicle on 26 May 1933. It raised £61,900 from forty two donors. A further £250,000 had been raised by the year's end. The following year's appeal raised £176,000. The organisation used the proceeds to support German Jews who were immigrating to the British Mandate of Palestine. Moreover, the organisation allocated funds to Zionist organisations that helped Jewish people emigrate to Palestine. It provided them with equipment, agricultural training and helped them build houses in what would later become the state of Israel. Furthermore, it funded institutions such as Hebrew University, the Technion, and the Maccabi World Union which provided immigrants with the skills and experience needed to become functional members of Palestine's nascent Jewish population.

CBF coordinated with the American Jewish Joint Distribution Committee (JDC) in 1936 to create the Council for German Jewry, which carried out much of the pre-war operations to relocate German Jews. The two organisations aimed to raise £3m that would resettle 66,000 German Jews.

=== Middle East ===
In 1936, Robert Waley Cohen and the members of the Women's Appeal Committee were alarmed by the placement of Youth Aliyah emigrants into non-Jewish or atheist communities in Palestine. The Ben Shemen Youth Village, part of the Youth Aliyah movement was supported by a sizeable donation to the Jewish National Fund from Berthold Israel, father of Wilfrid Israel. However, the CBF also contributed to the Ben Shemen Youth Village initiative. Additionally, the CBF provided support to the Hebrew University and the Technion, now the Technion – Israel Institute of Technology to offer employment opportunities for refugee scholars and settlers without academic qualifications.

A notable group of German Jewish intellectuals, who were committed Zionists and had immigrated to Palestine in the 1920s, played a crucial role in supporting the incoming refugee scholars and professionals after 1933. Furthermore, the CBF allocated funds to various organisations, including the Women's International Zionist Organization, the Palestine Corporation, and the World Maccabi Union.

Apart from these contributions, the CBF's budget predominantly focused on financing the operations of the Jewish Relief Committee's (JRC), agricultural training centres in Britain, refugee committees on the continent, and covering emigration and repatriation expenses in Germany. The remaining funds were largely directed towards projects aimed at aiding refugees in Palestine and developing the Jewish infrastructure in the region.

The CBF actively supported and financed immigration to Palestine. This initiative, endorsed by Rabbi Leo Baeck and others in Berlin, led to the rapid development of vocational training programmes in Germany and in countries that temporarily accommodated Jewish refugees.In 1933, the CBF inaugurated its first agricultural training centre in St Albans, Hertfordshire. These programmes sought to enhance the agricultural and industrial skills of their graduates, preparing them for their eventual arrival in Palestine. By 1934, approximately 200 young individuals were receiving training at this facility.

Osmond d'Avigdor-Goldsmid, a prominent figure in the CBF, supported the organisation's focus on Palestine as the primary destination for German-Jewish refugees. In a meeting at the Henry Street Settlement in New York, d'Avigdor-Goldsmid emphasised the practical benefits of directing funds to Palestine for the resettlement and reconstruction of the lives of refugees, based on the outcomes observed rather than theoretical approaches. He indicated that a significant portion of the CBF's budget was dedicated to this purpose. During the first three years of the CBF's operations, nearly £225,000 was allocated to assist German refugees in Palestine. This funding included contributions to the Keren Hayesod.

=== Britain ===
By 1935, CBF and the Jewish Refugees Committee (JRC) were funding a programme that placed Jewish scholars in British universities willing to take on faculty members and graduate students. The two programmes placed more than 200 refugees at universities, including Ernst Chain, who was part of a research team led by Howard Florey that developed Alexander Fleming's Nobel Prize-winning work on penicillin.

After the German-Austrian Anschluss in 1938, thousands of new refugees in Austria sought to emigrate because of Europe's worsening refugee crisis. The Council for German Jewry, represented by Norman Bentwich, attended the Évian Conference in France to push world leaders for less restrictive immigration policies. However, their requests for assistance were largely ignored. Later in that year the Kristallnacht exacerbated the refugee crisis and exhausted the JDC's financial and human resources. The CBF was eventually able to persuade the UK's Home Office to admit Jewish refugees regardless of financial backing. Consequently, 68,000 Jews registered before the start of the Second World War. For its part, CBF worked with the NGO Save the Children to establish the Inter-Aid Committee, which helped 471 Jewish and Christian children go to boarding schools in Britain.

In August 1945 the organisation flew 301 child concentration camp survivors to the United Kingdom's Lake District. The British weightlifter Ben Helfgott was among those rescued. The CBF brought 400 more child-survivors to Britain from 1946 to 1948. Most of the rescuees were boys.

== Kindertransport ==
In November 1938, Jewish leaders met with the British Prime Minister, Neville Chamberlain, to advocate for allowing German Jewish children to immigrate to Mandatory Palestine. This led the subject of children's immigration to the United Kingdom to be discussed in the next Cabinet meeting, and the UK changed its policy to allow for admittance of Jewish children with largely no paperwork. Having secured government support, CBF started the Kindertransport effort by establishing the Movement for Care of Children from Germany; together with the Baldwin Fund (headed by former Prime Minister Stanley Baldwin) the Movement raised £545,000 (£28.8 million in 2013 GBP) for Kindertransport. The Movement also identified thousands of Jewish and non-Jewish families from across Britain to host Jewish children during the war years. Additionally, it set up unused summer camps on the south coast of England to house refugees waiting for homes, and coordinated with Dutch organisations to transport children from Germany to the UK. Their efforts were aided by Geertruida Wijsmuller-Meijer, a member of the Netherlands Children's Refugee Committee, who met with eventual Final Solution administrator Adolf Eichmann and persuaded him to permit unaccompanied children to go to Britain. By the outbreak of war, the Movement had evacuated 9,354 children from Germany, 90% of them Jewish.

== Activities during the Second World War ==
Though evacuation attempts halted with the outbreak of war, CBF continued to support children who had already been evacuated and started new projects. CBF ensured that children were being educated in Jewish contexts, and together with the Movement, they took pains to ensure that every child could get religious education in the religion of her parents. After the war, CBF helped refugees to file claims to recover their families' property. Additionally, CBF and the Council for German Jewry leased a property with two campsites for £350 a year in 1939, renovating them within six months and opening up a camp for young German men at risk of deportation, the Kitchener Camp at Richborough. Over 3,500 men and hundreds of their wives were in residence when war broke out, many of whom would have surely been murdered in the Holocaust. The camp was disbanded by 1940 as many of the men enlisted, fighting for Britain. The Richborough men ended up in the British company that was evacuated from Dunkirk in 1940.

== Post-war years ==
In 1950, the Central British Fund for German Jewry (CBF), the Joint Distribution Committee (JDC), and the Jewish Agency for Israel established the Jewish Trust Corporation for Germany. This organisation was tasked with processing claims for the recovery of heirless and communal property in Germany. The process, led by Charles I. Kapralik in its London office, was extensive and involved legal efforts over many years. The Association of Jewish Refugees and the Council for the Protection of the Rights of German Jews, both based in London, supported this initiative. Teams, including many lawyers who were former refugees from Germany, dedicated years to identifying and reclaiming assets, including real estate. The recovered properties and financial compensations were distributed, with funds allocated to Israel and other countries where refugees had settled. In Britain, these funds supported various projects, such as residential homes for elderly refugees, synagogues, and day schools.

After the dismantling of the Berlin Wall in 1989, efforts intensified to recover properties in the former Soviet occupation zone in Germany. Additionally, following the establishment of the State of Israel in 1948, the CBF's earlier decision to support immigration to Palestine significantly contributed to Israel's development. The CBF's investments in land purchases, housing construction, and training programmes, along with grants to institutions like the Hebrew University of Jerusalem and the Technion in Haifa, played a pivotal role in building the Jewish infrastructure in Israel.

== Bibliography ==
- Turner, Barry (1993). The Long Horizon: 60 Years of CBF World Jewish Relief. London: CBF World Jewish Relief. ISBN 0-9520940-0-2.
- Gottlieb, Amy Zahl (1998). Men of Vision: Anglo-Jewry's Aid to Victims of the Nazi Regime 1933–1945. London: Weidenfeld & Nicolson. ISBN 0-297-84230-7.
- London, Louise (2000). Whitehall and the Jews, 1933-1948: British Immigration Policy, Jewish Refugees and the Holocaust. Cambridge University Press. ISBN 0-521-53449-6.

== See also ==
- Balfour Declaration
- Zionism
