= Netherlands in World War II =

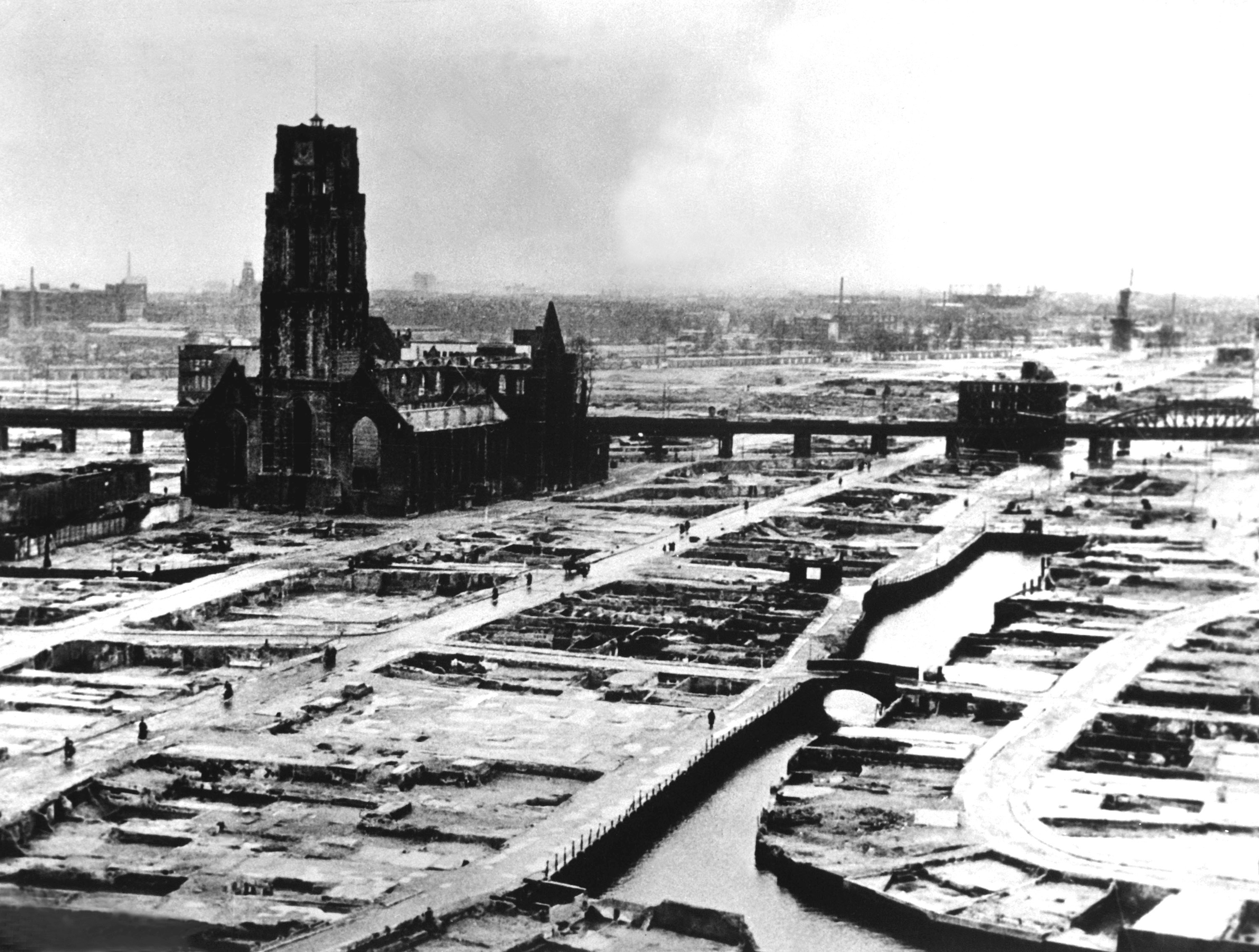
The city of Rotterdam after the German bombing during the Battle of the Netherlands in May 1940

World War II in the Netherlands can be broken down into four periods:

- September 1939 to May 1940: After the war broke out, the Netherlands declared neutrality. The country was later invaded and occupied by Nazi Germany.
- May 1940 to June 1941: An economic boom caused by orders from Germany, combined with the "velvet glove" approach from Arthur Seyss-Inquart, resulted in a comparatively mild occupation.
- June 1941 to June 1944: As the war intensified, Germany demanded higher contributions from occupied territories, resulting in a decline of living standards in the Netherlands. Repression against the Jewish population intensified and thousands were deported to extermination camps. The "velvet glove" approach ended. Meanwhile the Netherlands's East Indies possession in Southeast Asia was invaded and occupied by Japan.
- June 1944 to May 1945: Conditions in the Netherlands deteriorated further, leading to starvation and lack of fuel. The German occupation authorities gradually lost control over the situation. Nazis wanted to make a last stand and commit acts of destruction, others tried to mitigate the situation, until the country was finally liberated by the Allies. In the East Indies meanwhile, Japanese occupation continued until the surrender of Japan on the 15th of August 1945.

Despite Dutch neutrality, Nazi Germany invaded the Netherlands on 10 May 1940 as part of Fall Gelb (Case Yellow). On 15 May 1940, one day after the bombing of Rotterdam, the Dutch forces surrendered. The Dutch government and the royal family fled to London. Princess Juliana and her children sought refuge in Ottawa, Canada, until after the war.

German occupation lasted in some areas until the German surrender in May 1945. The occupiers deported most of the Jewish Netherlanders to Nazi concentration camps. Due to the variation in the survival rate of Jewish inhabitants among the regions in the Netherlands, scholars have questioned the validity of a single explanation at the national level. In part due to the well-organised population registers, about 70 per cent of the country's Jewish population were killed in the war—the highest rate in Western Europe, a much higher percentage than in Belgium or France, although lower than some Eastern countries like Lithuania. Declassified records revealed that the Germans paid a bounty to Dutch police and administration officials to find Jews. Hundreds of thousands of Dutch citizens were believed to be collaborators with the Germans. In early 1941, Communists in and around the city of Amsterdam organised the February strike—a general strike to protest the persecution of Jewish citizens. Active resistance, at first carried out by a minority, grew in the course of the occupation. In 1942, the East Indies colony was invaded and taken by Japan.

The Allies liberated most of the south of the Netherlands in the second half of 1944 but were unable to cross the great rivers. The rest of the country, especially the west and north, remained under German occupation and suffered from a famine at the end of 1944, known as the "Hunger Winter". On 5 May 1945, the German surrender at Lüneburg Heath led to the final liberation of the whole country, the Netherlands being one of the last nations of Europe to be liberated from Germany. This is now commemorated every year as Bevrijdingsdag (Liberation Day). The end of the war is commemorated as National Remembrance 15 August.

== Background ==
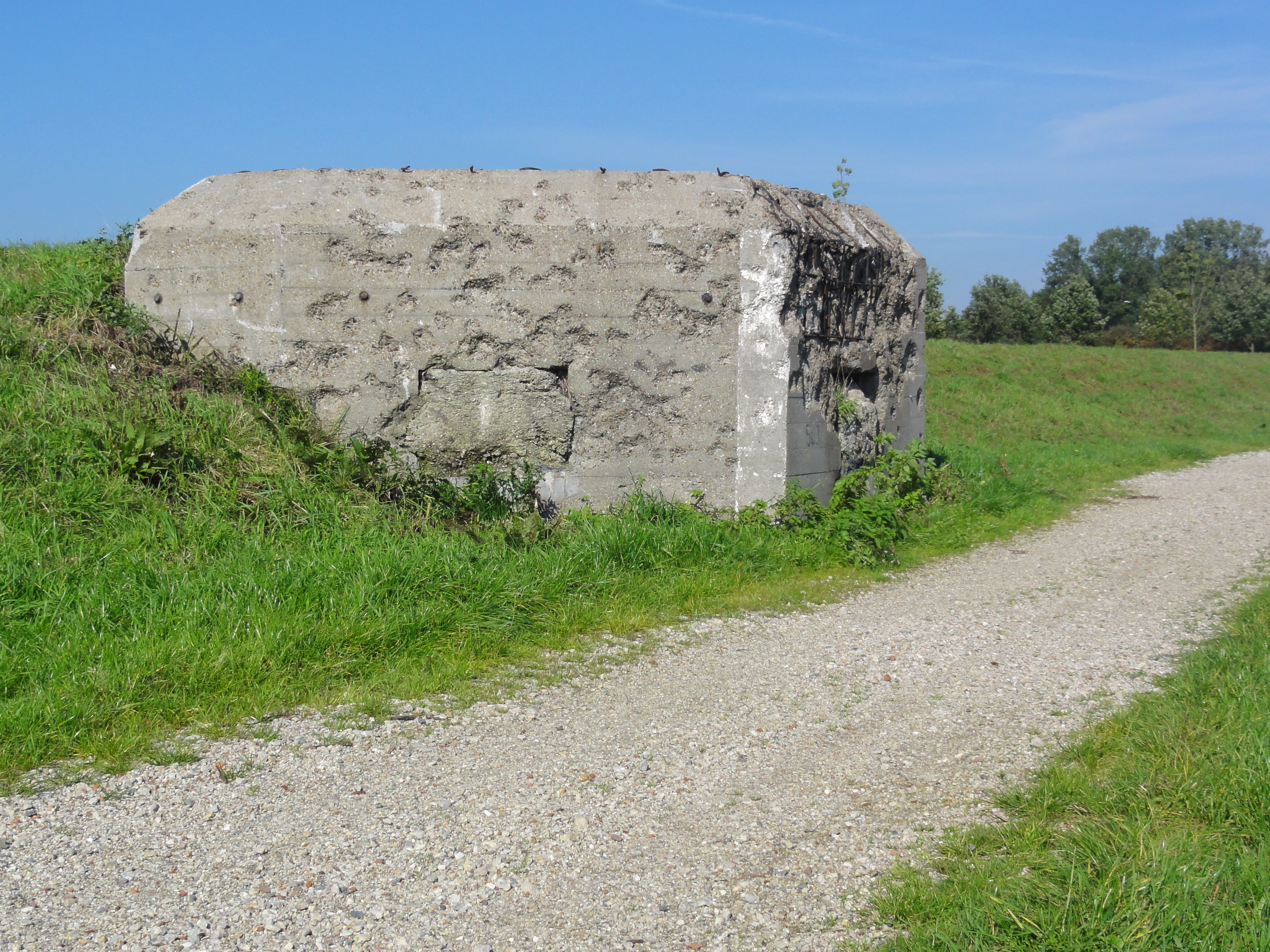
A bunker of the Peel-Raam Line, built in 1939

Its possession of colonies such as the Dutch East Indies (modern Indonesia) allowed the Netherlands to be one of the top five oil producers in the world and to have the world's largest aircraft factory in the Interbellum (Fokker), which aided the neutrality of the Netherlands and the success of its arms dealings in the First World War. The country was one of the richest in Europe and could easily have afforded a large and modern military. Dutch governments between 1929 and 1943 were dominated by Christian and centre-right political parties. From 1933, the Great Depression in the Netherlands, which had begun in 1929 occurred. The incumbent government of Hendrikus Colijn, in order to maintain the value of the guilder, pursued a programme of extensive cuts in public spending – which resulted in workers' riots in Amsterdam and a naval mutiny between 1933 and 1934. In 1936, the government was forced to abandon the gold standard and to devalue the currency.

Numerous fascist movements emerged in the Netherlands during the Great Depression; these were inspired by Italian fascism or German Nazism, but never attracted enough members to be an effective mass movement. The National Socialist Movement in the Netherlands (Nationaal-Socialistische Beweging, NSB) supported by the National Socialist German Workers' Party which took power in Germany in 1933, attempted to expand in 1935. Nazi-style racial ideology had limited appeal in the Netherlands, as did its calls to violence. At the outbreak of the Second World War, the NSB was already declining in both members and voters.

During the interwar period, the government undertook a significant increase in civil infrastructure projects and land reclamation, including the Zuiderzee Works. That resulted in the final draining of seawater from the Wieringermeer polder and the completion of the Afsluitdijk.

=== Neutrality ===
"The new Reich has endeavored to continue the traditional friendship with Holland [sic]. It has not taken over any existing differences between the two countries and has not created any new ones."

— German guarantee of neutrality, 6 October 1939

During World War I, the Dutch government, under Pieter Cort van der Linden, had managed to preserve Dutch neutrality throughout the conflict. In the Interwar Period, the Netherlands had continued to pursue its "Independence Policy" even after the rise to power of the Nazi Party in Germany in 1933. The Anti-Revolutionary Party's conservative prime minister, Hendrikus Colijn, who held power from 1933 until 1939, believed that the Netherlands could never withstand an attack by a major power. Pragmatically, the government did not spend much on the military. Although military spending was doubled between 1938 and 1939, amid rising international tensions, it constituted only 4% of national spending in 1939, in contrast to nearly 25% of Nazi Germany. The Dutch government believed it could rely on its neutrality or at least the informal support of foreign powers to defend its interests in case of war. The government began to work on plans for the defence of the country, which included the "New Dutch Waterline", an area to the east of Amsterdam that would be flooded. From 1939, fortified positions were constructed, including the Grebbe and Peel-Raam Lines, to protect the key cities of Dordrecht, Utrecht, Haarlem and Amsterdam, and creating a Vesting Holland (or "Fortress Holland").

In late 1939, with Britain and France already at war with Germany, the German government issued a guarantee of neutrality to the Netherlands. The Dutch military was gradually mobilised from August 1939 onwards, reaching its full strength by April 1940.

== German invasion ==
De Telegraaf issue from 10 May 1940 reporting on the invasion. The lead headline reads "Bitter resistance on the Ijsel and Maas [rivers]; Four German armored trains out of action." At center is a public announcement of resistance from Queen Wilhelmina.

On the morning of 10 May 1940, the German Army simultaneously invaded The Netherlands, Belgium, and Luxembourg without a formal declaration of war. The attackers meant to draw Allied forces away from the Ardennes, to lure British and French forces deeper into Belgium, and to pre-empt a possible British invasion in North Holland. The Luftwaffe also sought to take over Dutch airfields on the North Sea to launch air raids against Great Britain.

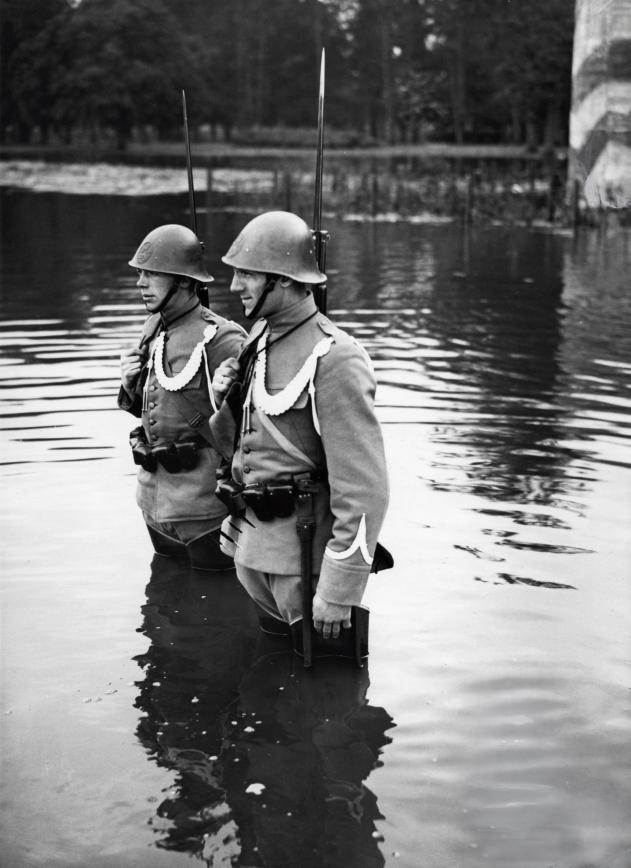
Dutch soldiers guard the Holland Water Line shortly after mobilisation, 1939

The armed forces of the Netherlands, with insufficient and outdated weapons and equipment, were caught largely unprepared. Much of their weaponry had not changed since the First World War. In particular, the Royal Netherlands Army did not have comparable armoured forces and could mount only a limited number of armoured cars and tankettes. The air force had only 140 aircraft, mostly outdated biplanes, 65 of which were destroyed on the first day of the campaign.

The invading forces advanced rapidly but faced significant resistance. A Wehrmacht parachute assault on The Hague aimed at capturing the Dutch government, Queen Wilhelmina, and the key airfields at Ockenburg and Ypenburg was thwarted by Dutch ground forces with heavy casualties. This allowed the royal family and top government officials to escape to London, taking the national bullion and diamond stocks, and form a Dutch government-in-exile. The Dutch also succeeded in destroying significant numbers of transport aircraft that the Germans would need for their planned invasion of Britain.

However, the German forces succeeded in crossing the Maas river in the Netherlands on the first day, which allowed the Wehrmacht to outflank the nearby Belgian Fort Ében-Émael and force the Belgian army to withdraw from the German border.

The Germans quickly were in control of most of the east of the country. In the centre of the Netherlands, the Germans succeeded in pushing the Dutch back from the Grebbe Line, but in the north their advance was blocked by the Dutch fortifications on the narrow Afsluitdijk Causeway that linked the northeastern and the northwestern parts of the Netherlands. The German forces in the south advanced rapidly and, by the fourth day, 9th Panzerdivision had penetrated the Fortress Holland over the Moerdijk bridges.

The Dutch realised that neither British nor French troops could reach the Netherlands in sufficient numbers to halt the invasion, particularly with the speed of the German advance into Belgium.

=== Bombing of Rotterdam ===
Fighting in Rotterdam had taken place since the first day of the campaign, when German infantrymen in seaplanes landed on the Maas River and captured several bridges intact. The Germans hesitated to risk a tank attack on the city for fear of heavy casualties. Instead, the German commander presented an ultimatum to the Dutch commander in the city. He demanded the surrender of the Dutch garrison and threatened to destroy the city by aerial bombing if it did not accept. The ultimatum was returned on a technicality since it had not been signed by the German commander. While the corrected ultimatum was being resubmitted, Luftwaffe bombers, unaware that negotiations were ongoing, struck the city.

During the Rotterdam Blitz, between 800 and 900 Dutch civilians were killed and 25000 homes were destroyed. The bombers' targets were the civilian areas of Rotterdam, rather than the town's defences. Under pressure from local officials, the garrison commander surrendered the city and his 10000 men on the evening of the 14th with the permission of Henri Winkelman, the Dutch commander-in-chief. That opened up the German advance into "Fortress Holland".

=== Dutch surrender ===
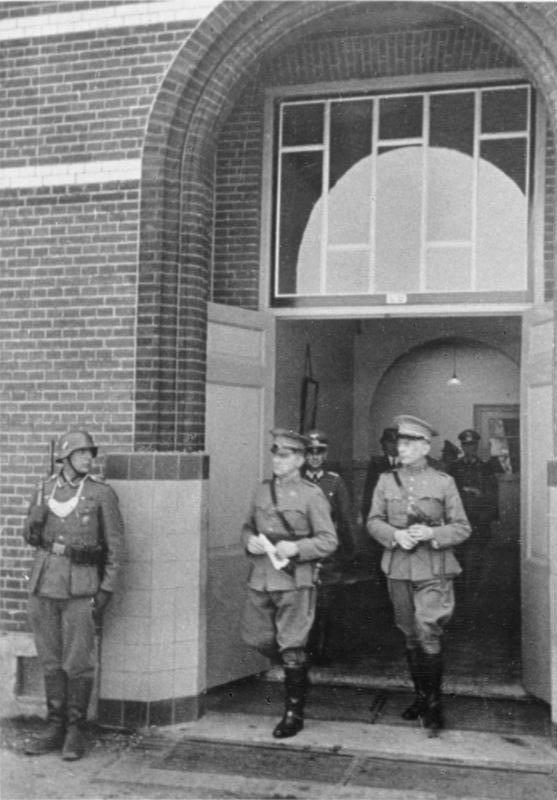
Henri Winkelman (centre), just after signing the Dutch capitulation, 15 May 1940

The Dutch high command was shocked by the Rotterdam Blitz. Knowing that the army was running low on supplies and ammunition and receiving news that the city of Utrecht had been given an ultimatum similar to that of Rotterdam, Winkelman held a meeting with other Dutch generals. They decided that further resistance was futile and wanted to protect civilian residents. In the afternoon of 14 May, Winkelman issued a proclamation to his army to order them to surrender:

This afternoon Germany bombarded Rotterdam, while Utrecht has also been threatened with destruction. In order to spare the civil population and to prevent further bloodshed I feel myself justified in ordering all troops concerned to suspend operations ... By great superiority of the most modern means [the enemy] has succeeded in breaking our resistance. We have nothing wherewith to reproach ourselves in connection with this war. Your bearing and that of the forces was calm, firm of purpose and worthy of the Netherlands.

— Proclamation of General Winkelman, 14 May 1940.

On 15 May, the Netherlands officially signed the surrender with Germany. Dutch forces in the province of Zeeland, which had come under French control, continued fighting alongside French forces until 17 May, when the bombardment of the town of Middelburg forced them, too, to surrender. The Dutch Empire, in particular the Dutch East Indies, supported the Allies; the colonies were unaffected by the surrender. Many ships of the Royal Dutch Navy in Dutch waters fled to the United Kingdom.

During the four-day campaign, about 2,300 Dutch soldiers were killed and 7000 wounded, and more than 3000 Dutch civilians also died. The Germans lost 2,200 men killed and 7000 wounded. In addition, 1,300 German soldiers captured by the Dutch during the campaign, many around The Hague, had been shipped to Britain and remained POWs for the rest of the war.

Queen Wilhelmina and the Dutch government succeeded in escaping from the Netherlands before the surrender and formed a government-in-exile. Princess Juliana and her children went to Canada for safety.

== German occupation ==
=== Occupation government ===
After a brief period of martial law, Germany invited the Dutch government to return from London and continue to govern under German control, as France and Denmark had done. When government leaders refused, Germany established the Reichskommissariat Niederlande ("Dutch Imperial Commission") as the occupation regime, assuming power on 29 May 1940, with its headquarters in The Hague. Austrian Nazi Arthur Seyss-Inquart was installed as Reichskommissar, with his office in a mansion on Museumplein in Amsterdam, today the home of the American consulate. Fellow Austrian Hanns Albin Rauter was assigned as SS and police leader, reporting to Seyss-Inquart and to SS chief Heinrich Himmler.

A long-term aim of the Nazis was to incorporate the Netherlands into the Greater Germanic Reich. Adolf Hitler thought highly of the Dutch people, considering them fellow members of the Aryan "master race".

In his first public address on 29 May, Seyss-Inquart promised friendly governance:

We have come with force of arms reluctantly, we want to be protectors and promoters to then remain friends... because we have to build a new Europe, where national honour and collective labour are the guiding principles.

However Seyss-Inquart began personally selecting and installing top officials, and one of his earliest orders was that German men in uniform be served first in Dutch shops and restaurants.

As in other occupied countries, the Ordnungspolizei ("Regulatory Police", commonly known as the "Green Police") were installed as the law-enforcement organization. The Green Police were supplemented from 1942 by the Voluntary Police Support (VHP), a neighborhood-watch organization of sympathetic Dutch civilians. The Sicherheitsdienst intelligence agency, known as the SD, operated from a headquarters in The Hague.

Also established in July 1940 was the Nederlandse Opbouwdienst (Dutch Construction Service) to dismantle the Dutch army and rebuild Dutch infrastructure. This would later be merged with the Nederlandse Arbeidsdienst (Dutch Labour Service), with a focus on building a labour force for the German war effort.

=== The NSB ===
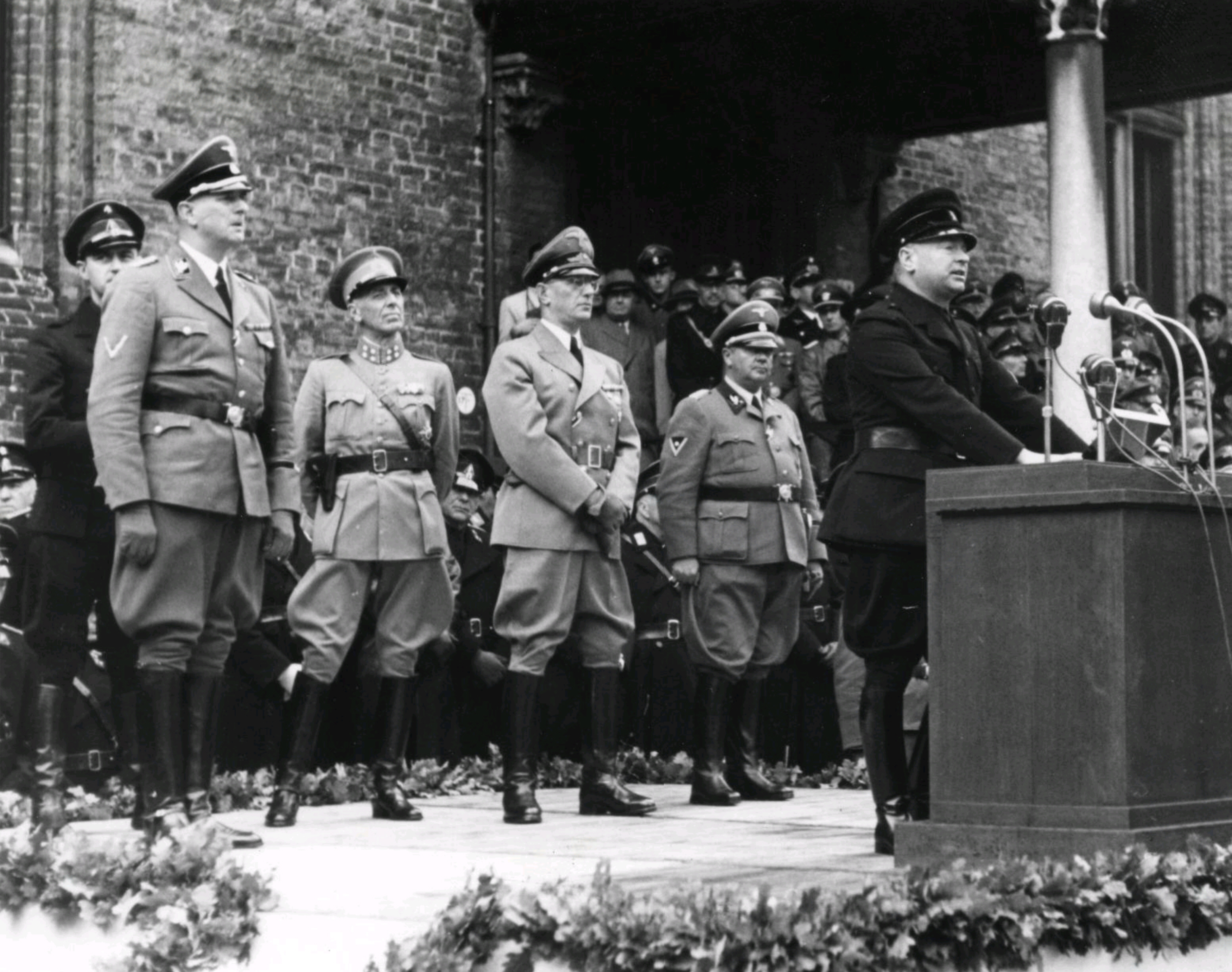
Anton Mussert, leader of the NSB, speaking at a rally in The Hague in 1941

The Dutch Nazi party (Nationaal-Socialistische Beweging, or NSB) had been founded in 1931 but was not politically powerful prior to the war. Under German occupation, the NSB quickly became the political arm of Dutch collaboration with German occupiers, quadrupling in membership to about 80,000, but never counting more than 1% of the Dutch population (3% of adult males) as members. The NSB played an important role in lower government and civil service. Every new mayor appointed by the German occupation government was a member of the NSB. However, for most higher functions, the Germans preferred to leave the existing elite in place, since they knew that the NSB neither offered enough suitable candidates nor enjoyed enough popular support.

Soon after the occupation, Germany banned all socialist and communist political parties. In July 1940, the Nederlandse Unie (Dutch Union) party was established to oppose the NSB and preserve Dutch culture. Within a few months its membership grew to 800,000, the highest membership any Dutch political party has ever had. However there were internal disagreements over the extent to which the party should cooperate with German occupiers, and in December 1941 Germany banned all parties other than the NSB.

New NSB members were shunned by some existing members who accused them of opportunism; meikevers (Maybugs) was a common slur, referring to the month of the German invasion.

The NSB sponsored paramilitary squads known as "blackshirts" who harassed Jews and conducted other targeted violence. The NSB's co-founder Anton Mussert remained its leader throughout the war. In September 1940, under German pressure, Mussert organised the Dutch wing of the Waffen-SS. About 22,500 Dutch men enlisted. Most of these fought on the Eastern front against Russia, and more than 7,000 died.

=== Collaboration ===
Many Dutch people chose or were forced to collaborate with the German regime or joined the German armed forces, which usually would mean being placed in the Waffen-SS. Others, like members of the Henneicke Column, were actively involved in capturing hiding Jews for a price and delivering them to the German occupiers. It is estimated that the Henneicke Column captured around 8000 to 9000 Dutch Jews who were ultimately murdered in the German death camps.

After the war broke out, the NSB sympathised with the Germans but nevertheless advocated strict neutrality for the Netherlands. In May 1940, after the German invasion, 10000 NSB members and sympathizers were put in custody by the Dutch government. Soon after the Dutch defeat, on 14 May 1940, they were set free by German troops. In June 1940, NSB leader Anton Mussert held a speech in Lunteren in which he called for the Dutch to embrace the Germans and renounce the Dutch Monarchy, which had fled to London.

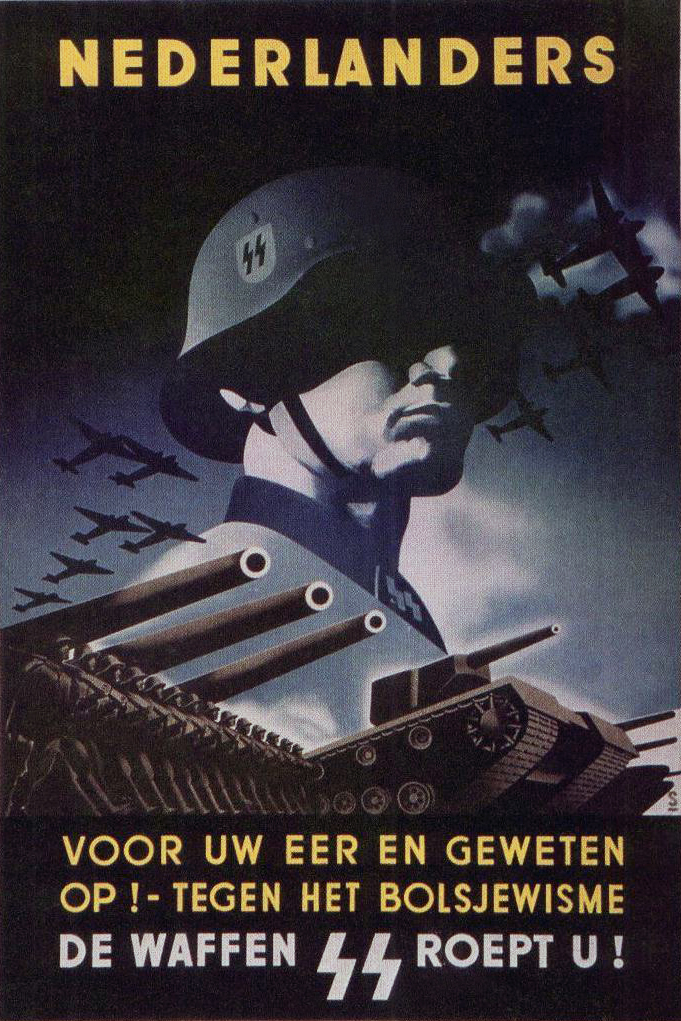
Dutch recruiting poster for the Waffen-SS

After the German signing of surrender on 6 May 1945, the NSB was outlawed. Mussert was arrested the following day, and was executed on 7 May 1946. Many members of the NSB were arrested, but few were convicted.

In September 1940, the Nederlandsche SS was formed as "Afdeling XI" (Department XI) of the NSB. It was the equivalent to the Allgemeine SS in Germany. In November 1942, its name was changed to Germaansche SS in Nederland (translation: 'Germanic SS in the Netherlands'). The Nederlandsche SS was primarily a political formation but also served as manpower reservoir for the Waffen-SS.

Between 22000 and 25000 Dutchmen volunteered to serve in the Waffen-SS. The most notable formations were the 4th SS Volunteer Panzergrenadier Brigade Nederland which saw action exclusively on the Eastern Front and the SS Volunteer Grenadier Brigade Landstorm Nederland which fought in Belgium and the Netherlands.

The Nederland brigade participated in fighting on the Eastern Front during the Battle of Narva, with several soldiers receiving the Knight's Cross of the Iron Cross, Nazi Germany's highest award for bravery.

Another form of collusion was providing goods and services essential to the German war efforts. Especially in 1940 and 1941, when a German victory was still a possibility, Dutch companies were willing to provide such goods to the greedily-purchasing Germans. Strategic supplies fell in German hands, and in May 1940 German officers placed their first orders with Dutch shipyards. The co-operation with the German industry was facilitated by the fact that due to the occupation the German market 'opened' and due to facilitating behaviour from the side of the partly pro-German elite. Many directors justified their behaviour with the argument that otherwise, the Germans would have closed down their company or would have replaced them with NSB members and so they could still exercise some limited influence. After the war, no heavy sentences were dealt to high officials and company directors.

== Life in occupied Netherlands ==
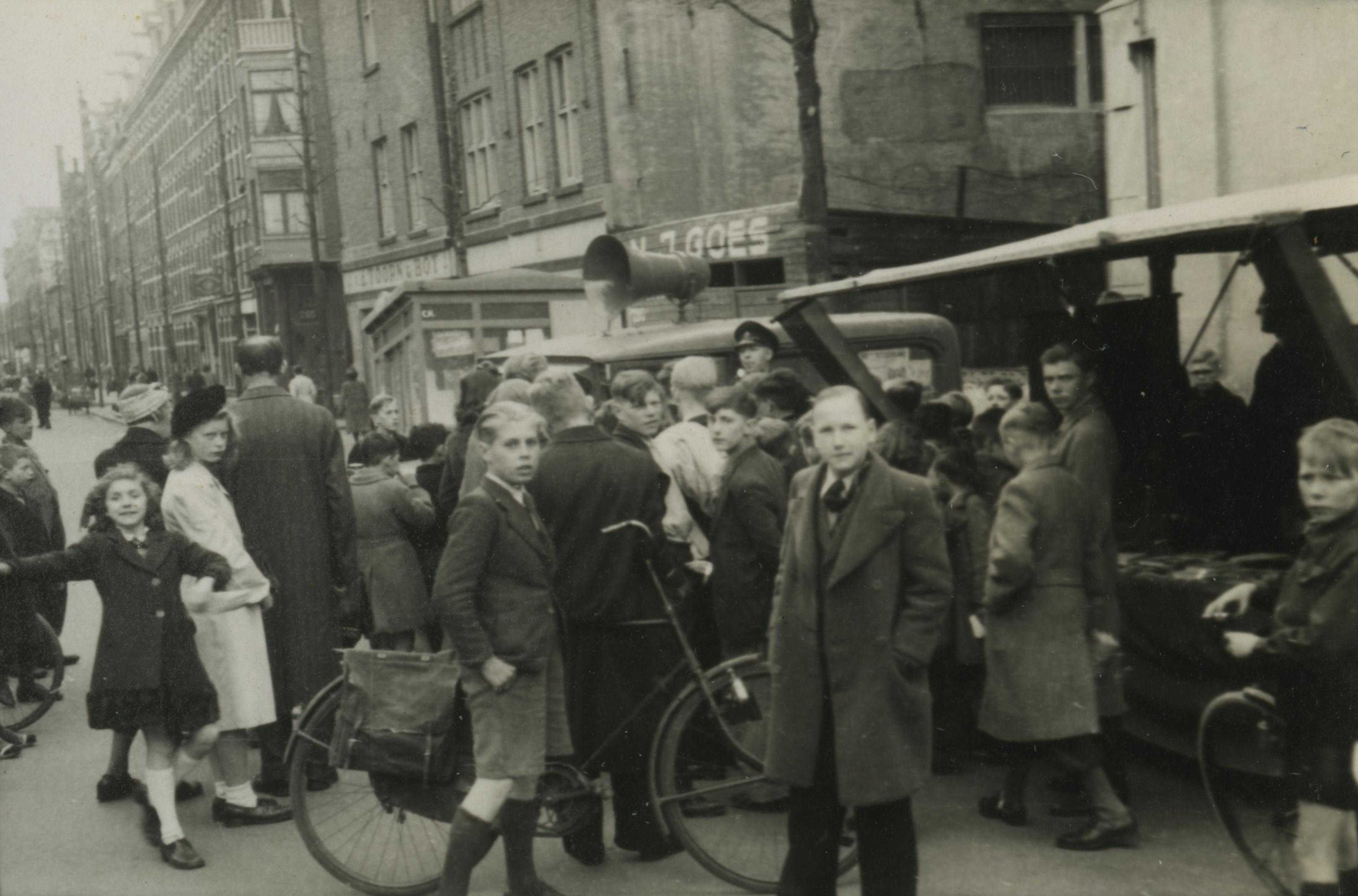
Amsterdam in April 1944

Initially, Seyss-Inquart applied a 'velvet glove' approach to appease the population and win them for the National Socialist ideology. That meant that he kept repression and economic extraction as low as possible and tried to co-operate with the elite and government officials in the country. There was also a pragmatic reason since the NSB offered insufficient candidates and had no great popular support. The German market was opened to the Netherlands, and Dutch companies benefited greatly from export to Germany even though, if the goods might be used for German war efforts, such trade might be seen as collaboration. In any case, despite the British victory in the Battle of Britain, many considered a German victory a realistic possibility and that it would therefore be wise to side with the winner. As a result, with the ban on other political parties, the NSB grew rapidly. Although gasoline pumps had been sealed in 1940, the occupation seemed tolerable.

The German occupiers implemented a policy of Gleichschaltung ("enforced conformity" or "coordination") and systematically eliminated non-Nazi organisations. In 1940, the German regime more or less immediately outlawed all socialist and communist parties. In 1941, it forbade all parties except for the National Socialist Movement in the Netherlands.

Gleichschaltung was an enormous shock to the Dutch, who had traditionally had separate institutions for all main religious groups, particularly Catholic and Protestant, because of decades of pillarisation. The process was opposed by the Catholic Church in the Netherlands, and in 1941, all Roman Catholics were urged by Dutch bishops to leave associations that had been Nazified.

At the behest of the German occupiers, a Dutch bureaucrat Jacob Lentz designed a counterfeit-proof identity card ('persoonsbewijs' or "PB") which all citizens were soon required to carry, a first for the country. The card included the bearer’s photograph, fingerprint, and a prominent letter J if they were Jewish.

After the failure of Operation Barbarossa in June 1941 and the subsequent German defeats at Moscow and Stalingrad in the Eastern Front of World War II, Germany increased economic extraction from its occupied territories, including the Netherlands. Economic extraction increased, and production was limited mostly to sectors relevant for the war effort. Repression increased, especially against the Jewish population.

After the Allied invasion of June 1944, the railroad strike and the frontline running through the Netherlands caused the Randstad to be cut off from food and fuel. That resulted in acute need and starvation, the Hongerwinter. The German authorities lost more and more control over the situation as the population tried to keep what little they had away from German confiscations and were less inclined to co-operate now that it was clear that Germany would lose the war. Some Nazis prepared to make a last stand against the Allied troops, followed Berlin's Nero Decree and destroyed goods and property (destructions of the Amsterdam and Rotterdam ports, inundations), but others tried to mediate the situation.

Among the notable social organisations during occupation was the Nationale Jeugdstorm ("National Youth-storm"), a Dutch counterpart to the Hitler Youth and an alternative to the banned Scouting Nederland with many parallels to both organisations. At its peak the NJS had over 12,000 members, mostly children of NSB members. When they reached 18 years of age, NJS members were assigned roles in the German war effort, with boys being conscripted to the Dutch Labour Service or the Waffen-SS.

=== Rations and restrictions ===
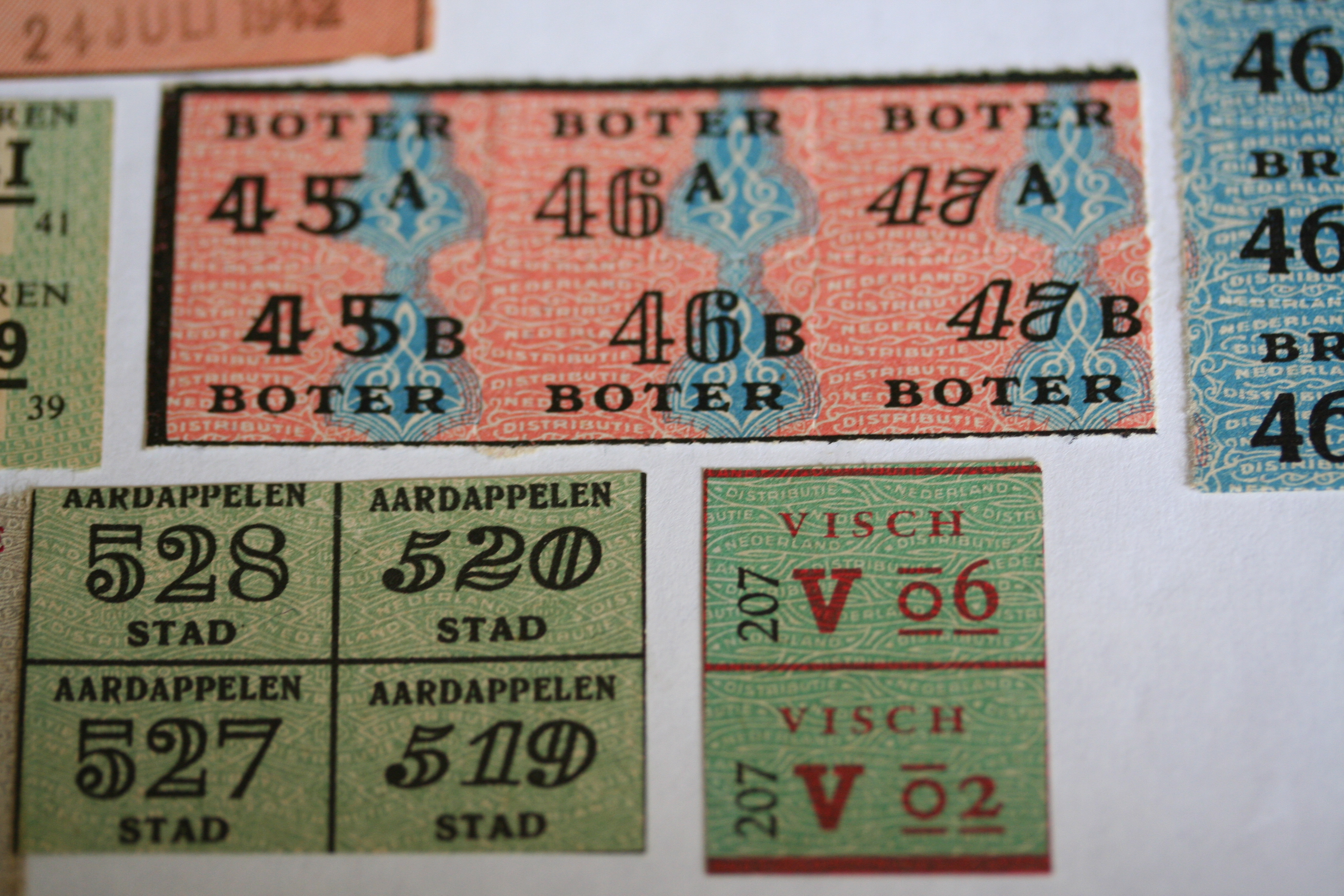
Ration stamps from the German-occupied Netherlands

Within five weeks of occupation, rations were set on bread, meat, milk, and sugar, the first of many limitations to come. Propaganda posters warned the Dutch against hoarding, with slogans like "Don't be a hamster." At times, the resistance would raid distribution centres to obtain ration cards to be distributed to those in hiding.

As in other countries at war, the entire country was required to observe a nighttime curfew and blackout conditions, with tarpaper used to cover windows at night. Civilians lived in fear of a heavy fine or a warning shot through their windows if any light was visible from the exterior. These conditions made the stars clearly visible even in city centres; astronomy books were popular in local libraries.

Raw materials quickly became harder to come by. In 1940, the occupiers announced that all bronze and copper was required to be handed in at designated locations. 6,700 of the 9,000 church bells in The Netherlands were eventually confiscated and melted down. Silver, nickel, and bronze were removed from Dutch coinage during 1942. Tires for bicycles and motor vehicles were especially difficult to find; many bicycles were fitted with inferior hard rubber or wooden tires. Gasoline was rationed until only German vehicles could be found on the roads.

The black market soon became an important economic engine for The Netherlands. Some black-market sales, such as cigarettes, were tolerated and performed in the open.

=== Media ===
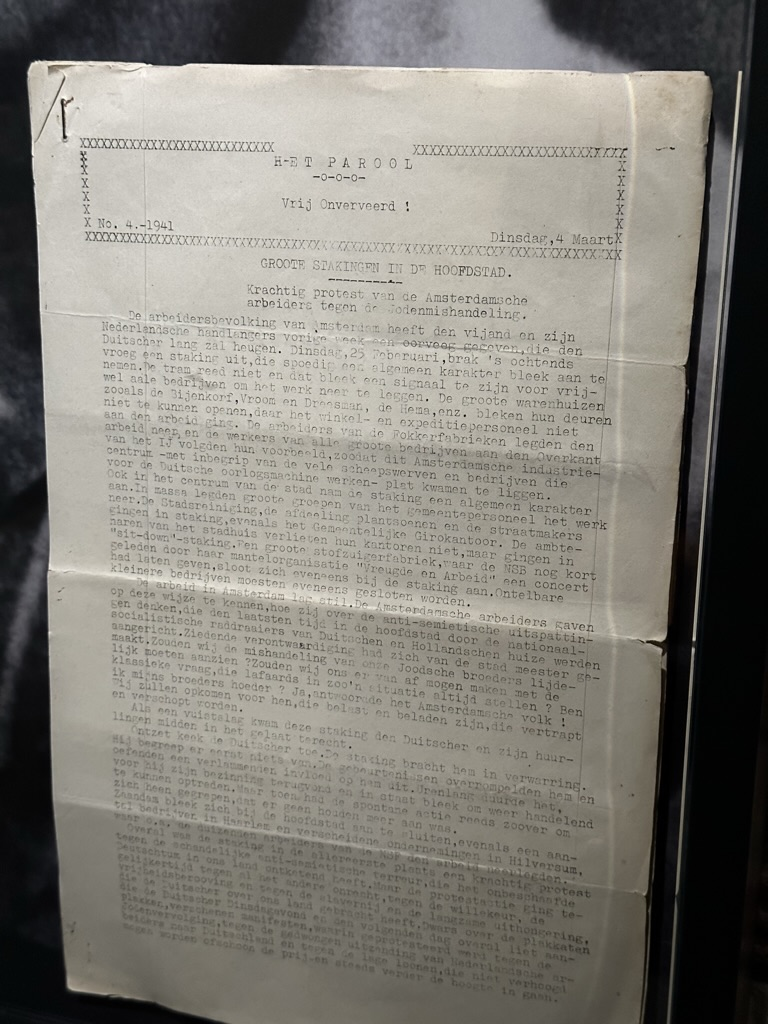
A 1941 issue of Het Parool published illegally under German occupation

The Dutch were subject to propaganda from both sides of the war. German propaganda encouraged Netherlanders to accept and collaborate with the occupiers, while the BBC European Service hosted a radio programme called Radio Oranje operated by the Dutch government-in-exile. Despite German jamming signals, many Dutch people were able to modify their radios to receive the program. In May 1943, the Germans ended their own radio propaganda and ordered all Dutch citizens to turn in their radios; approximately 80% did so, but thousands of radios were hidden, and resistance papers re-printed radio news along with instructions for building covert receivers.

About 1,100 illegal newspapers were published over the course of the occupation. Some were simple leaflets, printed and distributed in small areas. Others, including Het Parool, Vrij Nederland, De Waarheid, Trouw, and Ons Volk, were printed professionally with a secret nationwide network for reporting and distribution. The papers used a clandestine cell system, with readers receiving deliveries from unknown persons and then anonymously distributing them further.

=== Audrey Hepburn ===
Audrey Hepburn, later a celebrated actor and UNICEF ambassador, lived in The Netherlands from 1939 to 1948 and was exposed to the German occupation in multiple ways. Her parents were prominent members of the British Union of Fascists before the war, with her father under investigation by MI5 as a possible German agent.

Hepburn lived in Velp, directly adjacent to Arnhem. Near the end of 1943 when the German headquarters was moved to Velp, Reichskommissar Arthur Seyss-Inquart commandeered a home one block from Hepburn's.

In interviews after the war, Hepburn described Dutch Jews being deported from Arnhem Centraal railway station, men being shot in public, the bombardment of the Deelen airbase, the Battle of Arnhem, and sounds of torture from a Green Police prison. On one occasion she described being pushed under a German tank to avoid gunfire from strafing Spitfires. In 1943, Hepburn's older brother Ian was rounded up with other young men and deported to Germany as replacement labour.

Hepburn danced in zwarte avonden fundraising performances from mid-1944, describing their risk and saying "the best audiences I ever had made not a single sound at the end of my performance." She later described other resistance activities, including delivering underground newspapers and supporting Allied soldiers in hiding, where her fluent English proved useful. Hepburn's family briefly hid an Allied paratrooper during the Battle of Arnhem.

Hepburn was older than Anne Frank by less than six weeks and was later asked to play her in a 1959 film adaptation. She declined, saying: "It's a little bit as if this had happened to my sister. I couldn't play my sister's life. It's too close."

== Labour requirement ==
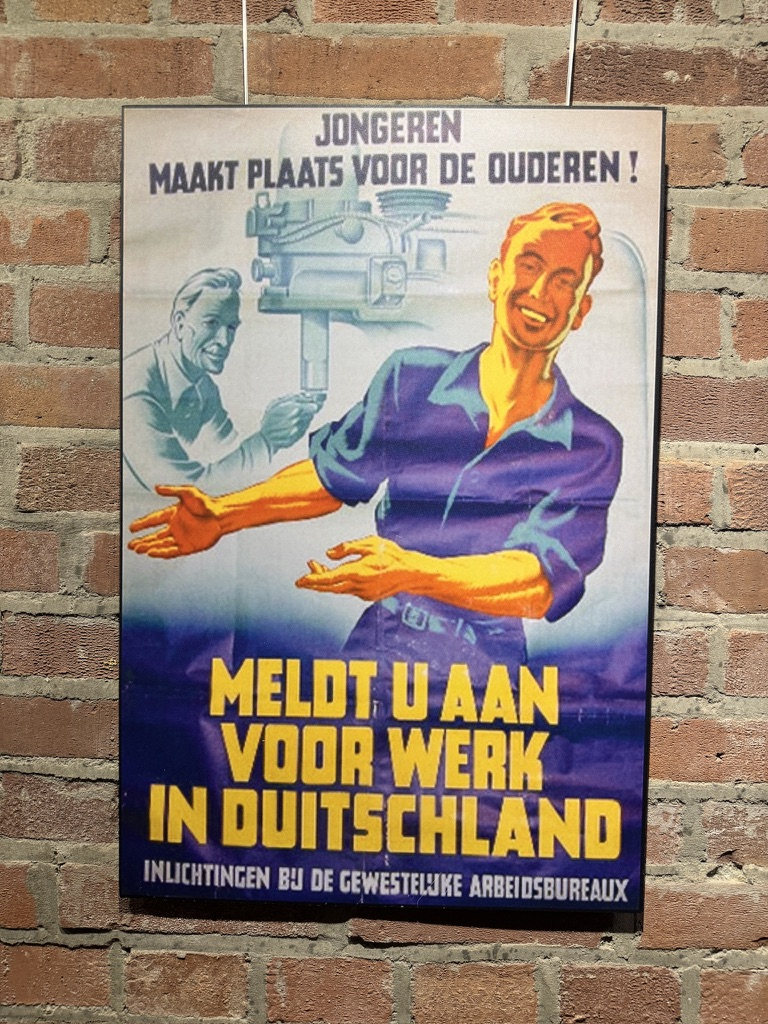
A Nazi poster encouraging Dutch youth to apply for work in Germany.

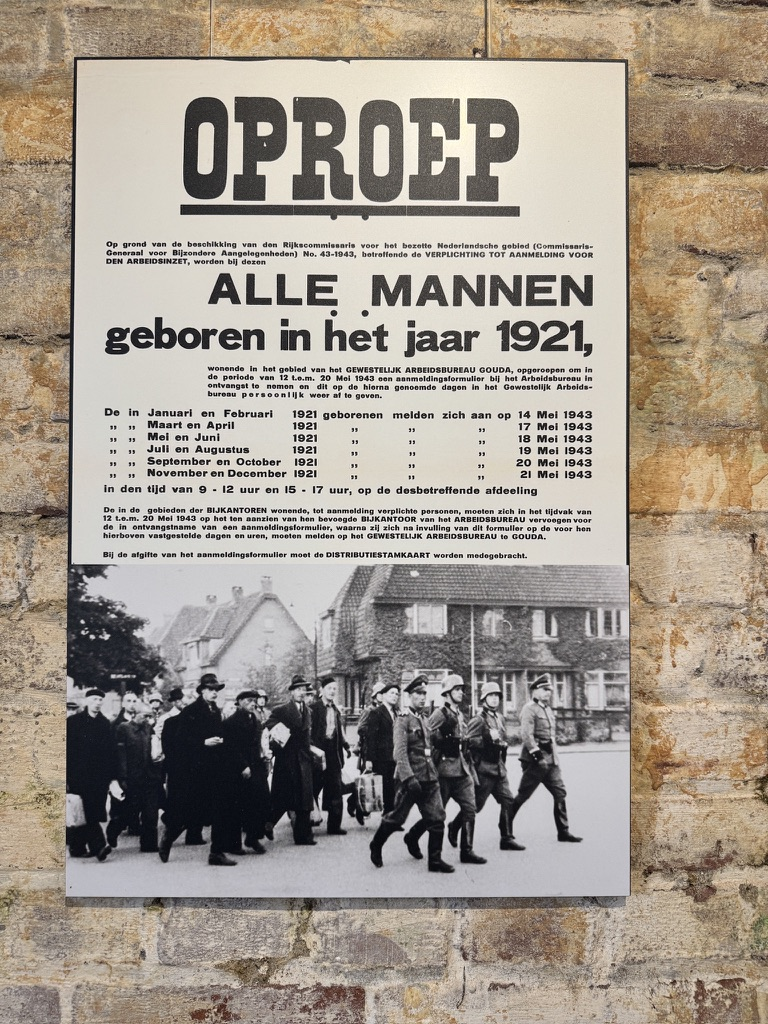
A 1943 Nazi poster announcing the work requirement (arbeidsinzet) for Dutch citizens born in 1921

The Nazis had encouraged Dutch people to migrate to Germany for work since the late 1930s. These efforts continued early in the occupation, but the "labour requirement" (arbeidsinzet in Dutch, arbeitseinsatz in German) was also instituted.

At first, only the unemployed and specialized labourers were compelled to join the German war effort. But on 28 February 1941, Arthur Seyss-Inquart announced an "obligation to perform services" that formed the basis of the arbeidsinzet, contrary to international law at the time.

Conscriptions of Dutch men into the Wehrmacht began in 1941. In 1942, facing an increasing demand for labour, authorities began calling up young men by birth year and rounding up eligible men for deportation, sometimes raiding companies or church services to do so.

On 29 April 1943, Germany announced that all former Dutch soldiers—300,000 men—were to be transported to Germany as prisoners of war. The Dutch population responded with the so-called "milk strike" (so named for the refusal of milkmen to complete their deliveries), the largest strike against German occupation of the war and the largest in Dutch history. The strike in turn produced harsh German reprisals: 80 strikers were summarily executed, and dozens more were killed in related violence. In Opende, a German truck opened fire without provocation against a group of gathered civilians. Support for Dutch resistance rose sharply as a result of the reprisals.

On 4 May 1943, the arbeidsinzet was expanded to all Dutch men between 18 and 35. Many refused or hid, producing a fraction of the needed labour force; by 1944, Germany had expanded the age range to 16-40. A single roundup in Rotterdam in October 1944 gathered 50,000 men to be deported.

Dutch workers were largely confined to Arbeitserziehungslager ("Labour education camps") under conditions sometimes comparable to concentration camps. Hunger, disease, and Allied bombing were among the dangers experienced by workers.

In all, over 500,000 Dutch people—one third of the eligible population—ended up working in Germany in some capacity. An estimated 30,000 Dutch citizens lost their lives in the arbeidsinzet as a result of bombings, work accidents, or health issues resulting from poor living conditions.

== Military installations ==
Bunkers and other military buildings were constructed throughout the country, often disguised as civilian houses with false windows and even geraniums. A large bunker for the Kampfcommandant, the highest military commander, was built across from the Concertgebouw on Museumplein in Amsterdam.

=== Detention camps ===
German authorities detained Dutch residents for a variety of reasons, most often for being Jewish (see The Holocaust) or suspected members of the Dutch Resistance. The Germans also detained hostages (gijzelaars) as leverage. In July 1940, 230 tourists from the Dutch East Indies were arrested as reprisal for the detention of German citizens in the East Indies. Another group of Dutch citizens were detained for the same reason in September 1940, and the Germans began making lists of prominent Netherlanders who could serve as hostages in the future.

The first organised detention camp on Dutch soil was Kamp Schoorl, previously a Dutch army camp, on the coast. Prisoners of war and other detainees were temporarily held here before being transferred elsewhere or released.

In the summer of 1941, the occupiers began establishing new camps. The most prominent were Kamp Amersfoort and Kamp Erika, which allowed the Germans to close Kamp Schoorl in October 1941. From December 1942, Camp Barneveld housed higher-class Dutch Jews in favourable conditions. In 1943, Herzogenbusch concentration camp was established in Vught, the only SS concentration camp outside of Germany.

Traditional prisons were also heavily used—notably Scheveningen prison, which had a German-built block for political prisoners. 28,000 were held there during the occupation. Detention House I at Weteringschans in Amsterdam also housed 25,000 prisoners. Some prisoners were detained indefinitely, while others were executed (often in reprisal for resistance attacks) or released for various reasons.

In addition to local detainees, Kamp Amersfoort housed German prisoners of war from as far away as the Eastern front. The present-day Soviet Field of Honour in Leusden includes the graves of 101 Soviet soldiers who died or were executed there.

In 1942 the Westerbork transit camp, previously built by the Dutch to process Jewish refugees from Germany, received its first trainload of detainees to be deported back to Germany. By far the most well-equipped camp, Westerbork featured a hospital, dental clinic, day care, and school. Despite these amenities, Westerbork was intended only as temporary accommodation before sending prisoners to concentration camps.

Though relatively few people died in the Dutch camps, summary executions and torture were common, and large numbers of detainees (including Anne Frank) died or were killed after being transferred to other camps.

=== Luftwaffe ===
The Luftwaffe was especially interested in the Netherlands, as the country was designated to become the main area for the air force bases from which to attack the UK. The Germans started construction of ten major military air bases on the day after the formal Dutch surrender, 15 May 1940. Each of them was intended to have at least 2 or 3 hard surface runways, a dedicated railway connection, major built-up and heated repair and overhaul facilities, extensive indoor and outdoor storage spaces, and most had housing and facilities for 2000 to 3000 men. Each air base also had an auxiliary and often a decoy airfield, complete with mock-up planes made from plywood. The largest became Deelen Air Base, north of Arnhem (twelve former German buildings at Deelen are now national monuments). Adjacent to Deelen, the large central air control bunker for Belgium and the Netherlands, Diogenes, was set up.

Within a year, the attack strategy had to be altered to a defensive operation. The ensuing air war over the Netherlands cost almost 20000 airmen (Allied and German) their lives and 6000 planes went down over the country, an average of three per day during the five years of the war.

The Netherlands turned into the first line of western air defence for Germany and its industrial heartland of the Ruhrgebiet, complete with extensive flak, sound detection installations and later radar. The first German night-hunter squadron started its operations from the Netherlands.

Some 30000 Luftwaffe men and women were involved in the Netherlands throughout the war.

=== Atlantic Wall ===
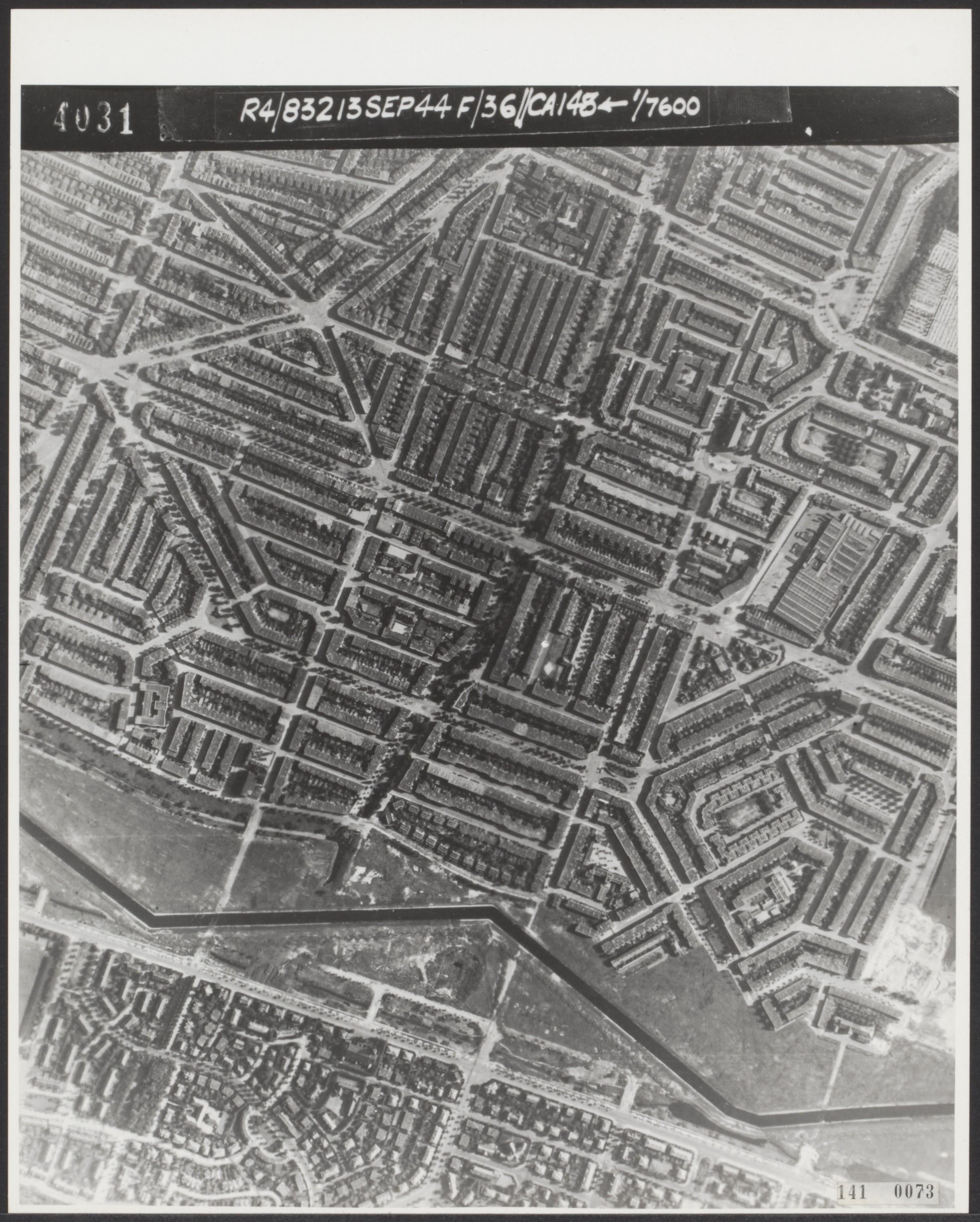
A 1944 aerial image of The Hague showing a massive tank canal bisecting the city near the beach.

The Netherlands was part of the Atlantic Wall series of fortifications against an Allied invasion, with civilian infrastructure replaced en masse with military defences. The two most secured locations were at Hoek van Holland and IJmuiden, defending the river approaches to Rotterdam and Amsterdam, respectively. The greatest civilian impact came in Scheveningen and The Hague, where 135,000 residents were forcibly moved and their homes demolished to allow construction of a massive water barrier. Dutch firms collaborated with the German army to build many defensive fortifications. German facilities in IJmuiden, Scheveningen, and Terschelling are maintained at Atlantic Wall museums.

The Atlantic Wall, a gigantic coastal defence line built by the Germans along the entire European coast from southwestern France to Denmark and Norway, included the coastline of the Netherlands. Some towns, such as Scheveningen, were evacuated because of that. In The Hague alone, 3200 houses were demolished and 2594 were dismantled. 20000 houses were cleared, and 65000 people were forced to move. The Arbeitseinsatz also included forcing the Dutch to work on these projects, but a form of passive resistance took place there with people working slowly or poorly.

=== Aerial battles ===
The Netherlands lay directly between the UK and many strategic targets in Germany, so Allied bombers were a common sight and sound in the sky for the duration of the war—typically British bombing raids at night and American raids during the day. High-altitude bombers were the first contrails that many Dutch residents had ever seen. The Germans in turn installed anti-aircraft batteries throughout the country, which continually panned the sky at night with searchlights and opened fire with guns and flak upon spotting a plane.

Aerial battles were spectacular sights on clear days, and flak debris, downed planes, and airmen (living or dead) rained down on Dutch soil. Air raids sometimes targeted the Netherlands, such as an assault on the Philips factory in Eindhoven on 6 December 1942 which killed 148 civilians. These became more intense during Operation Market Garden. An Allied raid on Arnhem on 17 September 1944 killed about 100 civilians, while a Luftwaffe counterattack against Eindhoven on 19 September killed 227 civilians and wounded 800. In addition, patrolling fighter planes would sometimes strafe opposing ground forces when spotted, putting civilian traffic at risk.

Later in the war, the Germans launched V1 flying bombs from The Netherlands against both England and Belgium. The first sortie against Antwerp was launched from Delft on 3 March 1945. These rockets flew as little as 900 meters overhead with a characteristic buzzing sound and often failed in flight, crashing in civilian areas—in one instance, twenty crashed in a single night.

The Netherlands itself was intermittently bombed during the war, with the 1940 Rotterdam bombardment being the most damaging. On 31 March 1943, 102 US bombers assigned to bomb the shipyards at Rotterdam instead hit residential areas, killing over 300 civilians. On 22 February 1944, a planned US bombing raid on Gotha, Germany was cancelled, and returning bombers were instructed to bomb "targets of opportunity." Nijmegen, Arnhem, Deventer, and Enschede were subsequently attacked, with the bombing of Nijmegen alone killing 800 or more civilians. Not until mid-May 1944 were bombers instructed to seek out targets of opportunity at least 30 kilometres away from the Netherlands' border.

== Holocaust ==
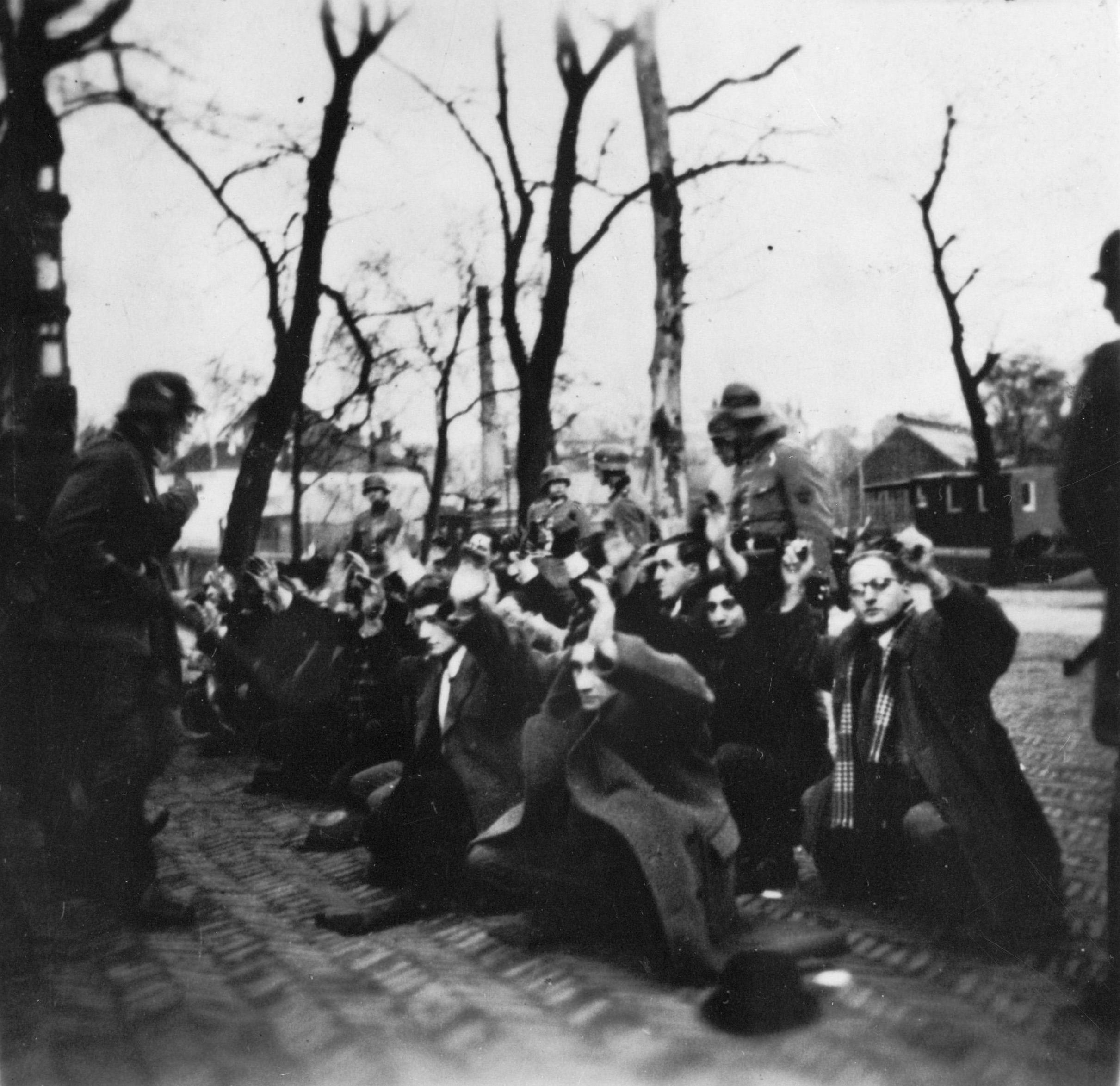
Germans arrest Jews in the Jonas Daniel Meijerplein in Amsterdam, February 1941

The Jewish population of the Netherlands in 1939 was between 140000 and 150000, 24000–34000 of whom were refugees from Germany and German-controlled areas. That year, the Committee for Jewish Refugees established the Westerbork transit camp to process incoming refugees; in 1942 the German occupiers repurposed it to process outgoing Jews to labour and concentration camps. Over half of the total Jewish population—about 79000—lived in Amsterdam; this number increased as Germans forcibly moved Dutch Jews into the city in preparation for mass deportation.

Jews were deeply integrated into Dutch culture, and there was a popular belief that they could or would not be isolated as they had been in other occupied lands. However the German authorities required Dutch businesses to register almost immediately after occupation, and by the end of 1940 required all public officials to sign a "Declaration of Aryan Descent" or be dismissed. Jewish citizens were registered and identified, first with a "J" in their identity cards and later by a Jewish star.

The German occupiers systematically stripped Jews of rights and property, often with the participation of Dutch authorities. A series of violent events in February 1941 culminated in a mass arrest of 425 Jewish Amsterdammers on 22–23 February. The Dutch reacted with the February strike, a nationwide protest against the deportations, unique in the history of Nazi-occupied Europe. The strike was forcibly put down and its leaders were executed, but it was a setback for Seyss-Inquart, who had intended to both deport the Jews and win the Dutch over to the Nazi cause.

Before the February strike, the Nazis had installed a Jewish Council (Dutch: Joodse Raad). This was a board of Jews, headed by Professor David Cohen and Abraham Asscher. Independent Jewish organisations, such as the Committee for Jewish Refugees—founded by Asscher and Cohen in 1933—were closed. The Jewish Council ultimately served as an instrument for organising the identification and deportation of Jews more efficiently; the Jews on the council were told and convinced they were helping the Jews.

In January 1942, the Jewish population was "evacuated" to the three Jewish districts of Amsterdam. In May of that year, Jews were ordered to wear Star of David badges. The Catholic Church in the Netherlands publicly condemned the government's action in a letter read at all Sunday parish services. The Nazi government began to treat the Dutch more harshly, and notable socialists were imprisoned. Later in the war, Catholic priests, including Titus Brandsma, were deported to concentration camps.

=== Deportations ===
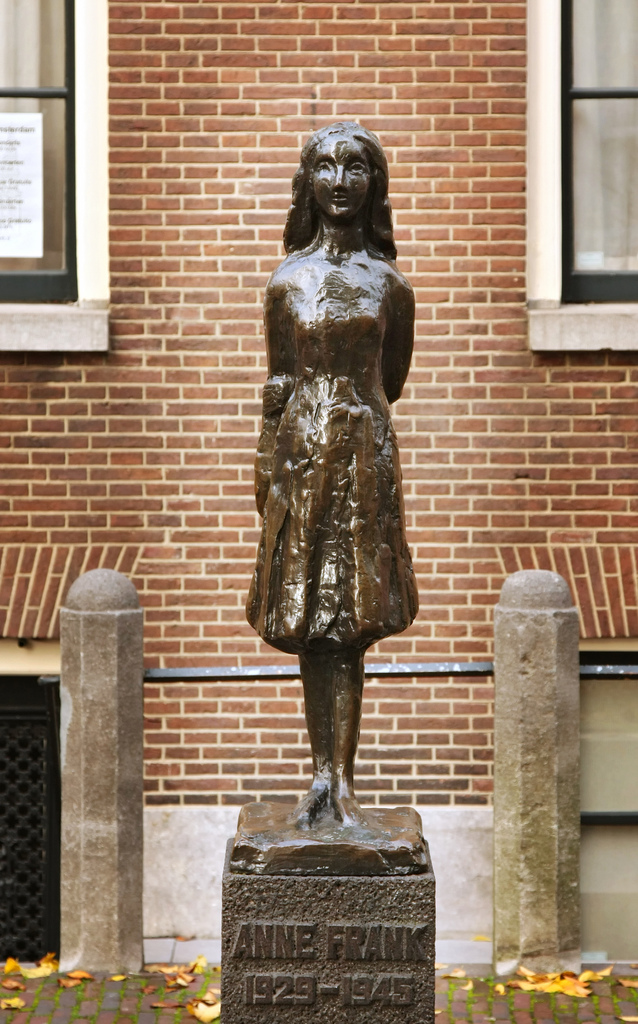
Anne Frank's Diary of a Young Girl has been translated into some sixty languages since its publication.

Large-scale deportations from The Netherlands began on 15 July 1942 and ultimately included 100,000 Jews, most of whom died or were killed in German concentration camps. About 25–30,000 Jews went into hiding as onderduikers (literally "under-divers")—most famously Anne Frank, who hid with her family in an Amsterdam house from July 1942 for over two years before being discovered.

Concentration camps were built at Vught and Amersfoort as well. Eventually, with the assistance of Dutch police and civil service, the majority of the Dutch Jews were deported to concentration camps.

Following the last major round-ups and deportations, Amsterdam—the last Jewish population centre—was declared "judenrein" ("Jew-free") in November 1943.

=== Survival rates and causes ===
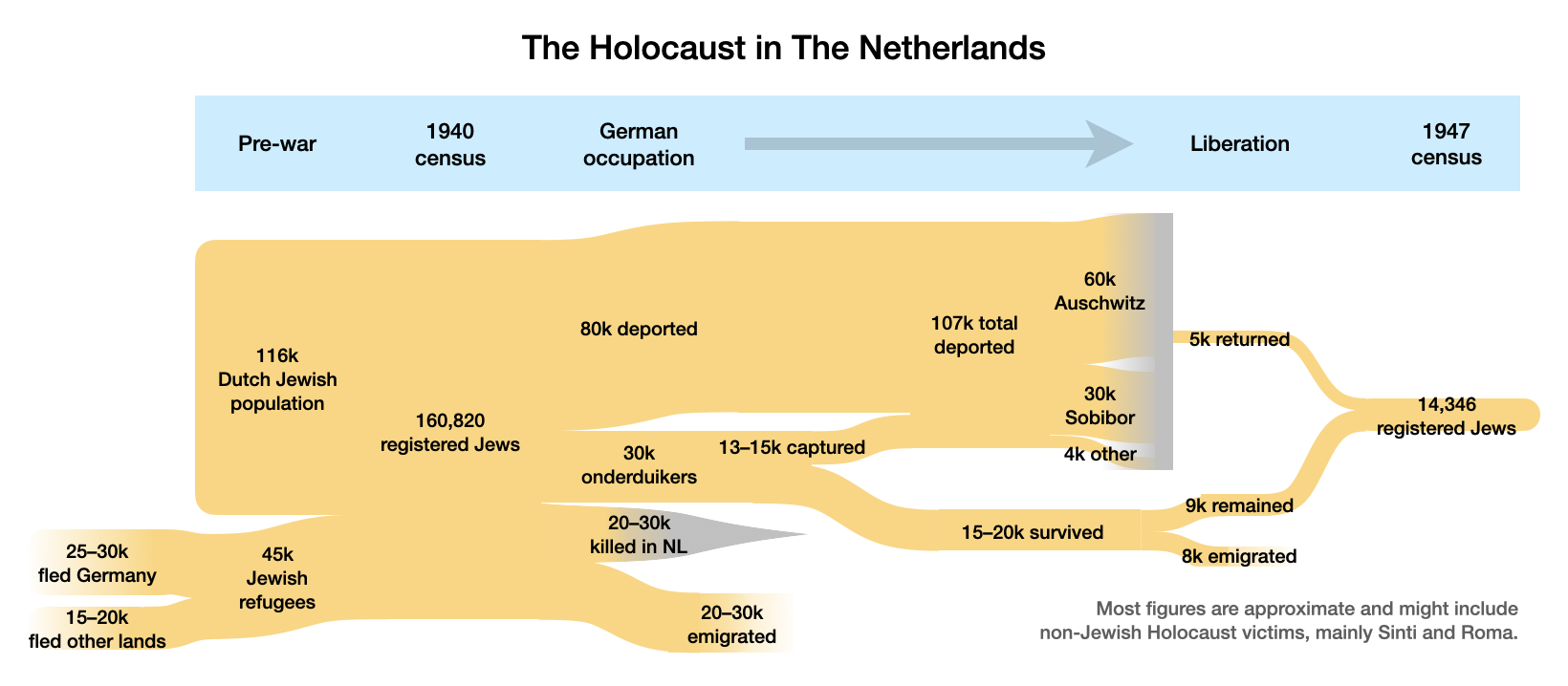
Sankey diagram of the Jewish population of The Netherlands during World War II

Some 75% of the Dutch-Jewish population was killed in the Holocaust, an unusually high percentage compared to other occupied countries.

By 1945, the Dutch Jewish population was about a quarter of what it had been (about 35000). Of that number, about 8,500 escaped deportation by being in a mixed marriage to a non-Jew; about 16,500 hid or otherwise evaded detection by German authorities; and 7000–8000 escaped the Netherlands for the duration of the occupation. The Dutch survival rate is much lower than in neighbouring Belgium, where 60% of Jews survived, and France, where 75% survived. Historians have offered several hypotheses for the low survival rate, including:

- The Netherlands included religion in its national records, which reduced the opportunity for Jews to mask their identity.
- Dutch authorities and the Dutch people were unusually co-operative with German authorities.
- The flat, unforested Dutch landscape deprived Jews of potential hiding places.

Marnix Croes and Peter Tammes examined the survival rates among the different regions of the Netherlands. They conclude that most of the hypotheses do not explain the data. They suggest that a more likely explanation was the varying "ferocity" with which the Germans and their Dutch collaborators hunted Jews in hiding in the different regions. In 2002, Ad van Liempt published Kopgeld: Nederlandse premiejagers op zoek naar joden, 1943 (Bounty: Dutch bounty hunters in search of Jews, 1943), published in English as Hitler's Bounty Hunters: The Betrayal of the Jews (2005). He found in newly-declassified records that the Germans paid a bounty to police and other collaborators, such as the Colonne Henneicke group, for tracking down Jews.

A 2018 publication, De 102.000 namen, lists the 102000 known victims of the persecution of Jewish, Sinti, and Roma people from the Netherlands; the book is published by Boom, Amsterdam, under the auspices of the Westerbork Remembrance Center.

== Dutch resistance ==
Though many Dutch people attempted to get along with their daily lives, resentment of the German occupiers became increasingly widespread. A popular code phrase at the time was o zo (Dutch: "so there"), used as an abbreviation for Oranje zal overkomen: "Orange (The Netherlands) shall overcome." "OZO" was a common graffito in The Netherlands throughout the occupation. The Dutch discussed "Axing Day" (Bijltjesdag), the future day when the country would be liberated and civilians would use their axes against the occupiers.

The royal family was a symbol of resistance throughout the occupation. On 29 June 1940, Prince Bernhard's birthday, many Netherlanders wore carnations in their lapels as Bernhard often did. The Germans reacted to "Carnation Day" by removing royal portraits from public buildings and later changing royal street names. The Dutch continued to wear pins and ribbons honouring Queen Wilhemina. Wilhemina broadcast a total of 34 messages on Radio Oranje from London between 1940 and 1945. She referred to the Germans as moffen or moff, a Dutch slur describing unwashed or backward people.

Organized resistance activities developed slowly and were mostly non-violent, ranging from hiding Jews and other onderduikers to publishing illegal papers. Stealing and forging identity cards and ration coupons was also common. To support these efforts, on 27 March 1943, a resistance group set fire to the Amsterdam Registry Office. Also in 1943, the National Organization for Aid to Those in Hiding formally established a paramilitary wing called the National Organization of Armed Squads (nl:Landelijke Knokploegen, or LKP). Resistance groups offered counterintelligence, domestic sabotage, and communications networks provided key support to Allied forces beginning in 1944 and through the liberation of the country.

Germans countered resistance activities with raids, brutal interrogations, double agents known as V-Men (V-Männer), and violent reprisals. These reprisals grew more harsh and indiscriminate as the war continued. Discovery by the Germans of involvement in the resistance meant an immediate death sentence. Hundreds of resistance fighters and other detainees were shot in the Kennemer dunes near Bloemendaal, today home to a Cemetery of Honour and memorial.

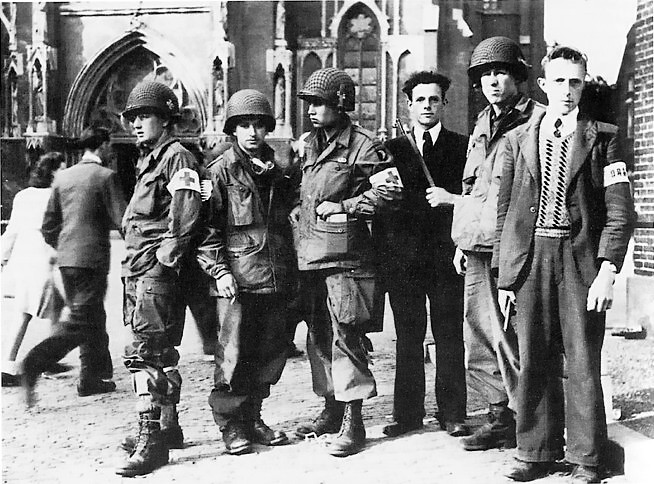
Members of the Dutch Resistance, identified by their cloth armbands, with American paratroopers of the 101st Airborne Division in Veghel, September 1944

The country's terrain, lack of wilderness and dense population made it difficult to conceal any illicit activities, and it was bordered by German-controlled territory, which offered no escape route except by sea. Resistance in the Netherlands took the form of small-scale decentralised cells engaged in independent activities. The Communist Party of the Netherlands, however, organised resistance from the start of the war, as did the circle of liberal democratic resisters who were linked through Professor Dr. Willem or Wim Schermerhorn to the Dutch government-in-exile in London, the LKP ("Nationale Knokploeg", or National Force Units, literal translation "Brawl Crew"). This was one of the largest resistance groups, numbering around 550 active participants; it was also heavily targeted by Nazi intelligence for destruction due to its links with the UK. Some small groups had absolutely no links to others. These groups produced forged ration cards and counterfeit money, collected intelligence, published underground newspapers, sabotaged phone lines and railways, prepared maps, and distributed food and goods. After 1942 the National Organisation (LO) and National Force Units (LKP) organised national coordination. Some contact was established with the government in London. After D-day the existing national organisations, the LKP, the OD and the Council of Resistance merged into the internal forces under the command of Prince Bernhard.

One of the riskiest activities was hiding and sheltering refugees and enemies of the Nazi regime, Jewish families, underground operatives, draft-age Dutch, and others. Collectively these people were known as onderduikers ('under-divers'). Later in the war, this system of people-hiding was also used to protect downed Allied airmen. Reportedly, resistance doctors in Heerlen concealed an entire hospital floor from German troops.

Funding for the resistance and the needy was largely raised by Walraven van Hall, who masterminded a money laundering operation at the Dutch National Bank that netted as much as 50 million guilders before being detected and dismantled. Among other fundraising activities were secret concerts called zwarte avonden ("black evenings"), which offered a creative outlet to performance artists who were banned by the Kultuurkamer.

=== Major attacks ===
In February 1943, a Dutch resistance cell rang the doorbell of the former head of the Dutch general staff and now-collaborating Lieutenant general Hendrik Seyffardt in the Hague. Seyffardt commanded the campaign to recruit Dutch volunteers for the Waffen-SS and the German war effort on the Eastern Front. After he answered and identified himself, he was shot twice and died the following day. The assassination of the high-level official triggered a harsh reprisal from SS General Hanns Albin Rauter, who ordered the killing of 50 Dutch hostages and a series of raids on Dutch universities.

On October 1 and 2, 1944, the Dutch resistance attacked German troops near the village of Putten. In response, German troops destroyed part of the town and shot seven people (see Putten raid). The entire male population of Putten was then deported and most were subjected to forced labour; 48 out of 552 survived the camps.

On 23 October 1944, SD officer nl:Herbert Oelschlägel was assassinated on Apollolaan in Amsterdam. The Germans burned two adjacent homes and shot 29 randomly-chosen prisoners at the same location. 30 prisoners were shot in the same way on the Weteringsplantsoen on 12 March 1945 after the killing of another SD agent. In both cases, passers-by were forced to witness the executions, and the bodies were left in place on the public square.

On the night of 6–7 March 1945, the Dutch resistance attacked SS and Police Leader Hanns Albin Rauter's car at Woeste Hoeve. Though Rauter was not specifically targeted in the attack, he was injured and hospitalized for the remainder of the war. In reprisal, the Germans rounded up and executed 116 men at Woeste Hoeve and executed another 147 Gestapo prisoners elsewhere.

== Dutch government and army in exile ==
The Dutch army's successful resistance in the Battle for The Hague gave the royal family an opportunity to escape. Several days before the surrender, Princess Juliana, Prince Bernhard and their daughters (Princess Beatrix and Princess Irene) travelled from The Hague to London. On 13 May, Queen Wilhelmina and key members of the Dutch government followed. The royal family were guests at Buckingham Palace, where Irene was christened on 31 May. Juliana later took Beatrix and Irene to Canada, where they remained for the duration of the war.

Shortly after the German victory, the Dutch government, led by Prime Minister Dirk Jan de Geer, was invited by the Germans to return to the country and to form a pro-German puppet government, as the Vichy government had agreed to do in France. De Geer wanted to accept that invitation, but the Queen refused it and dismissed him in favour of Pieter Gerbrandy.

== Dutch East Indies and war in the Far East ==
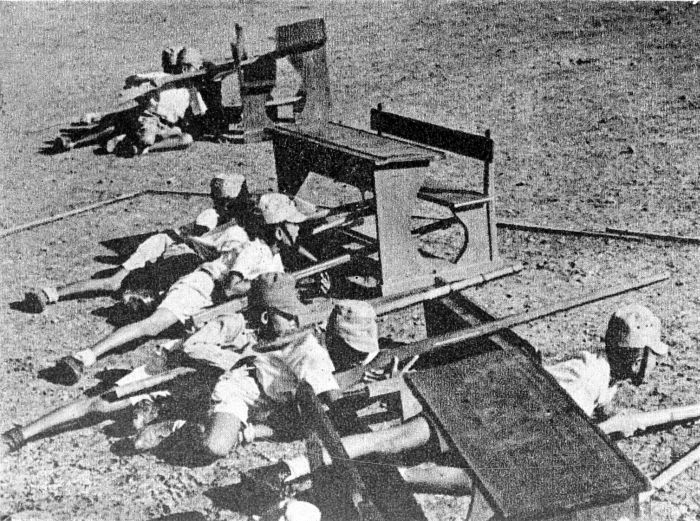
Indonesian youths being trained by the Japanese Army

On 8 December 1941, the Netherlands government-in-exile declared war on the Empire of Japan. On 10 January 1942, the Japanese invaded the Dutch East Indies (now Indonesia).

Dutch naval ships joined forces with the Allies to form the American-British-Dutch-Australian (ABDA) Fleet, commanded by Dutch Rear Admiral Karel Doorman. On February 27–28, 1942, Doorman was ordered to take the offensive against the Imperial Japanese Navy. His objections on the matter were overruled. The ABDA fleet finally encountered the Japanese surface fleet at the Battle of the Java Sea at which Doorman gave the order to engage. During the ensuing battle, the Allied fleet suffered heavy losses. The Dutch cruisers Java and De Ruyter were lost, together with the destroyer Kortenaer. The other Allied cruisers, the Australian Perth, the British Exeter, and the American Houston, tried to disengage but were spotted by the Japanese in the following days and were eventually all destroyed. Many ABDA destroyers were also lost.

After Japanese troops had landed on Java, and the Royal Netherlands East Indies Army had been unsuccessful in stopping their advance because the Japanese could not occupy a relatively-unguarded airstrip, the Dutch forces on Java surrendered on 7 March 1942. Some 42000 Dutch soldiers were taken prisoner and interned in labour camps, but some were executed on the spot. Later, all Dutch civilians (some 100000 in total), were arrested and interned in camps, and some were deported to Japan or sent to work on the Thai-Burma Railway. During the Japanese occupation, between 4 and 10 million Javanese were forced to work for the Japanese war effort. Some 270000 Javanese were taken to other parts of Southeast Asia; only 52000 of those survived.

A Dutch government study described how the Japanese military forcibly recruited women as prostitutes in the Dutch East Indies and concluded that among the 200 to 300 European women working in Japanese military brothels, "some sixty five were most certainly forced into prostitution". Others, faced with starvation in the refugee camps, agreed to offers of food and payment for work, the nature of which was not completely revealed to them.

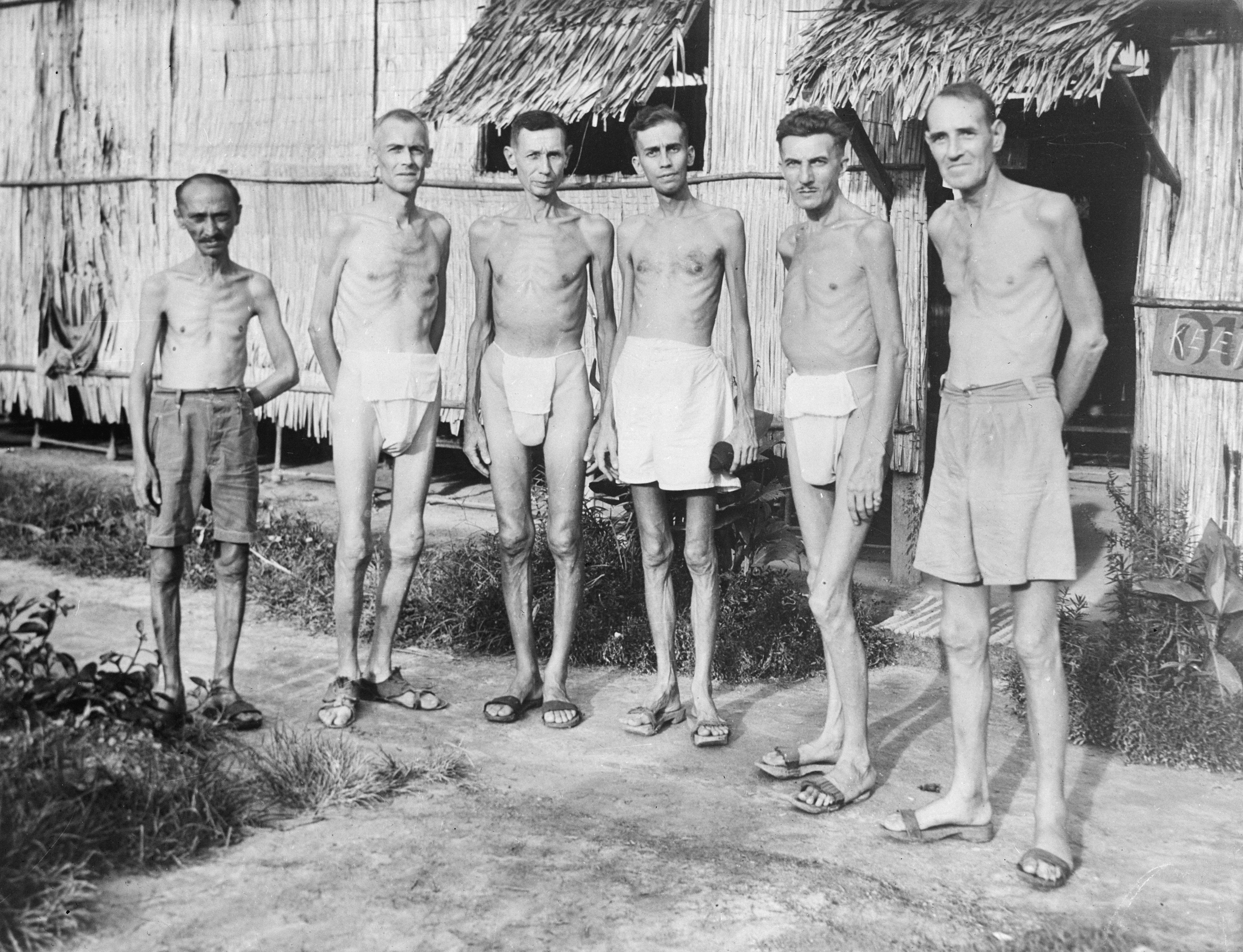
Liberated Dutch prisoners in Indonesia (Dutch East Indies) in 1945

The Dutch submarines escaped and resumed the war effort from bases in Australia such as Fremantle. As a part of the Allied forces, they were on the hunt for Japanese tankers on their way to Japan and the movement of Japanese troops and weapons to other sites of battle, including New Guinea. Because of the significant number of Dutch submarines active in the Pacific Theatre of the war, the Dutch were named the "Fourth Ally" in the theatre, along with the Australians, the Americans, and the New Zealanders.

Many Dutch Army and Navy airmen escaped and, with aeroplanes provided by the Americans, formed the Royal Australian Air Force's Nos. 18 and 120 (Netherlands East Indies) Squadrons, equipped with B-25 Mitchell bombers and P-40 Kittyhawk fighters, respectively. No. 18 Squadron conducted bombing raids from Australia to the Dutch East Indies. Both squadrons eventually also participated in their recapture.

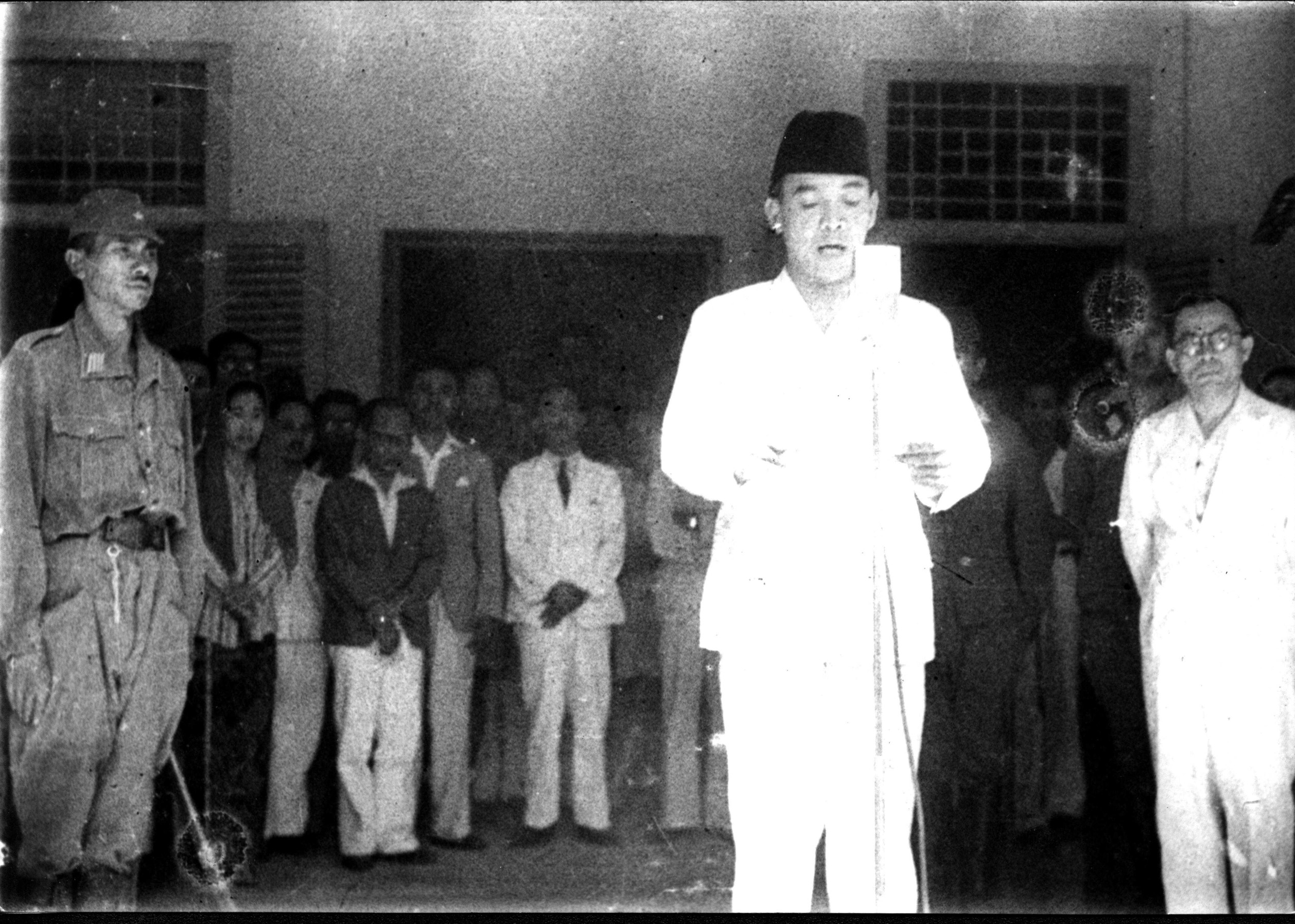
Sukarno announcing the independence of Indonesia in Batavia

Gradually, control of the Netherlands East Indies was wrested away from the Japanese. The largest Allied invasion of the Pacific Theatre took place in July 1945 with Australian landings on the island of Borneo to seize the strategic oil-fields from the Japanese forces, which were now cut off. At the time, the Japanese had already begun independence negotiations with Indonesian nationalists such as Sukarno, and Indonesian forces had taken control of sizeable portions of Sumatra and Java. After the Japanese surrender on 15 August 1945, Indonesian nationalists, led by Sukarno declared Indonesian independence, and a four-year armed and diplomatic struggle between the Netherlands and the Indonesian nationalists began.

Dutch civilians, who suffered greatly during their internment, finally returned home to a land that had greatly suffered as well.

== Allied invasion ==
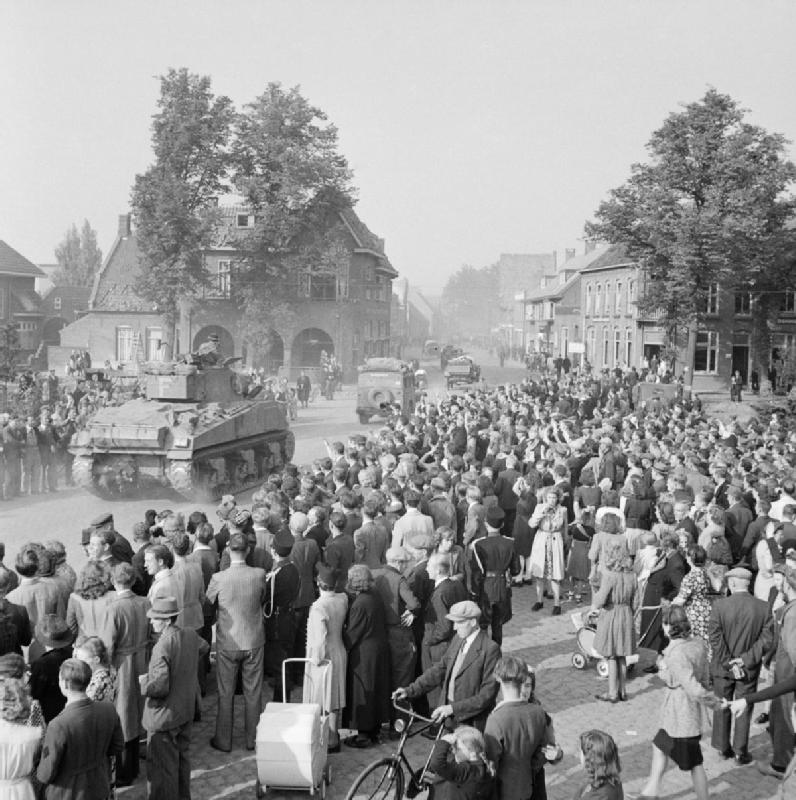
British Sherman tanks liberate Valkenswaard during Operation Market Garden, September 1944.

Allied forces invaded Normandy in France on 6 June 1944 and captured Antwerp in Belgium on 4 September. This prompted Seyss-Inquart to declare a "state of siege", implement an 8pm curfew, and recall German civilians back to Germany. Many German soldiers and Dutch NSB members followed suit and 3,500 prisoners were deported from Camp Vught. These actions, combined with false rumours that Breda had been liberated, led to Dolle Dinsdag ("Mad Tuesday") on 5 September, when the civilian population spontaneously celebrated imminent liberation.

Also in September, German occupiers destroyed large portions of the Port of Rotterdam and sank many ships to make it unusable to Allied forces.

Allied forces first entered The Netherlands at Mesch on 12 September, and Maastricht was the first Dutch city to be liberated on 13–14 September. Operation Market Garden, the major Allied invasion, began on 17 September, with the goal of creating a salient from the Belgian border northeast to the German border. Some 35,000 paratroopers were dropped into The Netherlands along the intended salient with the goal of capturing key bridges across the rivers Meuse, Waal and Rhine. That day, the Dutch government-in-exile called for a nationwide railway strike to cripple German troop transport. Some 30,000 railway employees walked off the job, with financial support from London. Germany substituted its own trains and retaliated with a six-week ban on food transport to the western Netherlands, but the strike continued until the war's end.

Operation Market Garden was a tactical failure, but established a partial salient from the Belgian border through Eindhoven and Nijmegen and helped liberate much of The Netherlands south and west of the Maas River. Operation Pheasant in October and November made further gains, liberating the province of North Brabant. A subsequent German counterattack against the Nijmegen salient (the Island) was defeated in early October.

During this time, areas of Zeeland in the south were deliberately flooded by both sides. The Germans evacuated and flooded the island of Schouwen-Duiveland in September to deter invasion, while the Allies bombed the dikes around Walcheren in October to force its defenders back and open the port of Antwerp. Up to 75% of local Zeeland populations were forcibly evacuated during this period.

In the east of North Brabant and in Limburg, British and American forces during Operation Aintree managed to defeat the remaining German forces west of the Meuse between late September and early December 1944 by destroying the German bridgehead between the Meuse and the Peel marshes. During the offensive, the only tank battle ever fought on Dutch soil took place at Overloon.

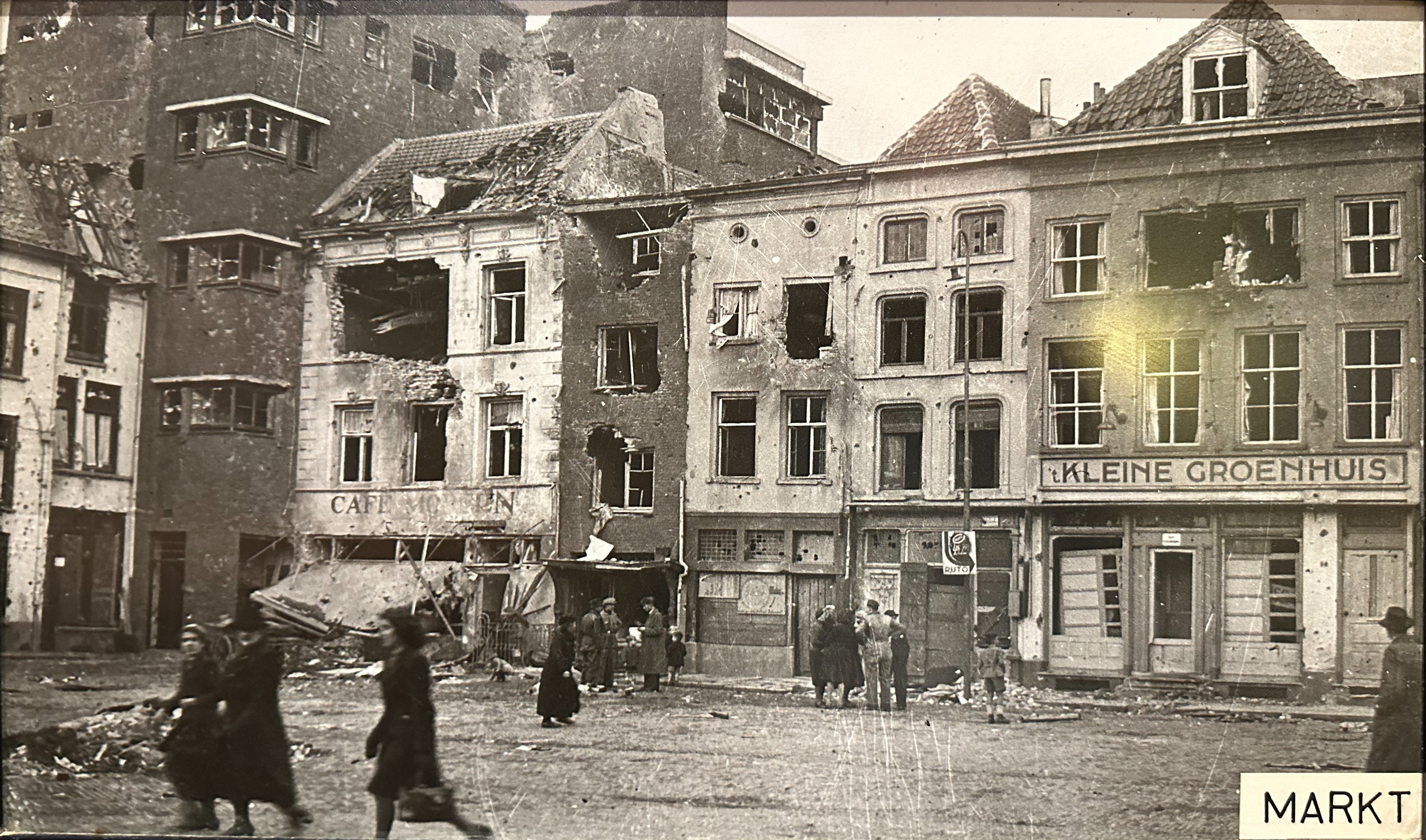
The city centre of Den Bosch after liberation, November 1944.

At the same time, the Allies also advanced into the province of Zeeland. At the start of October 1944, the Germans still occupied Walcheren and dominated the Scheldt estuary and its approaches to the port of Antwerp. The crushing need for the shipping port at Antwerp forced the Battle of the Scheldt, in which First Canadian Army fought on both sides of the estuary during the month to clear the waterways. Large battles were fought to clear the Breskens Pocket, Woensdrecht and the Zuid-Beveland Peninsula of German forces, primarily occupied by reserve Wehrmacht units composed of convalescents and the medically unfit (dubbed "stomach" units for their ulcers) as well as German paratroopers of Battle Group Chill.

By 31 October, resistance south of the Scheldt had collapsed, and the Canadian 2nd Infantry Division, British 52nd (Lowland) Division and 4th Special Service Brigade all made attacks on Walcheren Island. Strong German defences made a landing very difficult, and the Allies responded by bombing the dikes of Walcheren at Westkapelle, Vlissingen and Veere to flood the island. Though the Allies had warned residents with pamphlets, 180 inhabitants of Westkappelle died. The coastal guns on Walcheren were silenced in the opening days of November and the Scheldt battle declared over. No German forces remained intact along the 64 mi (103 km) path to Antwerp.

After the offensive on the Scheldt, Operation Pheasant was launched in conjunction to liberate North Brabant. After some resistance, the offensive liberated most of the region, including Tilburg, 's-Hertogenbosch, Willemstad and Roosendaal by the British; Bergen Op Zoom by the Canadians; and Breda by the Polish 1st Armoured Division led by General Maczek.

In early March 1945, the 784th Tank Battalion—one of only three African-American battalions in the US Army—liberated 15 settlements in North Limburg, including Roermond and Venlo, and gave many Dutch citizens their first encounters with Black people.

== 1944–1945 ==
After securing the shipping route to Antwerp, the Allied army focused its efforts on the invasion of Germany, ensuring that the north—including some 4.5 million Dutch residents—would remain occupied until near the end of the war, as food and fuel supplies began to run out.

From September 1944, trams were the only public transport allowed in The Netherlands; on 9 October, these too came to a halt as the supply of electricity to civilians was permanently stopped. The ongoing seizure of civilian bicycles further crippled the movement of Dutch civilians.

By late 1944, Germany had abandoned its conciliatory behaviour toward the Dutch people. Anyone suspected of resistance—including anyone found to be armed—was sentenced to death without trial, though their public executions were typically delayed until a corresponding resistance action occurred. Reprisals became increasingly harsh: on 1 October, after an attack on a German car near Putten, the entire male population of the village (602 men) was transported to concentration camps while 105 homes were burned. (See Putten raid)

=== Hunger Winter ===
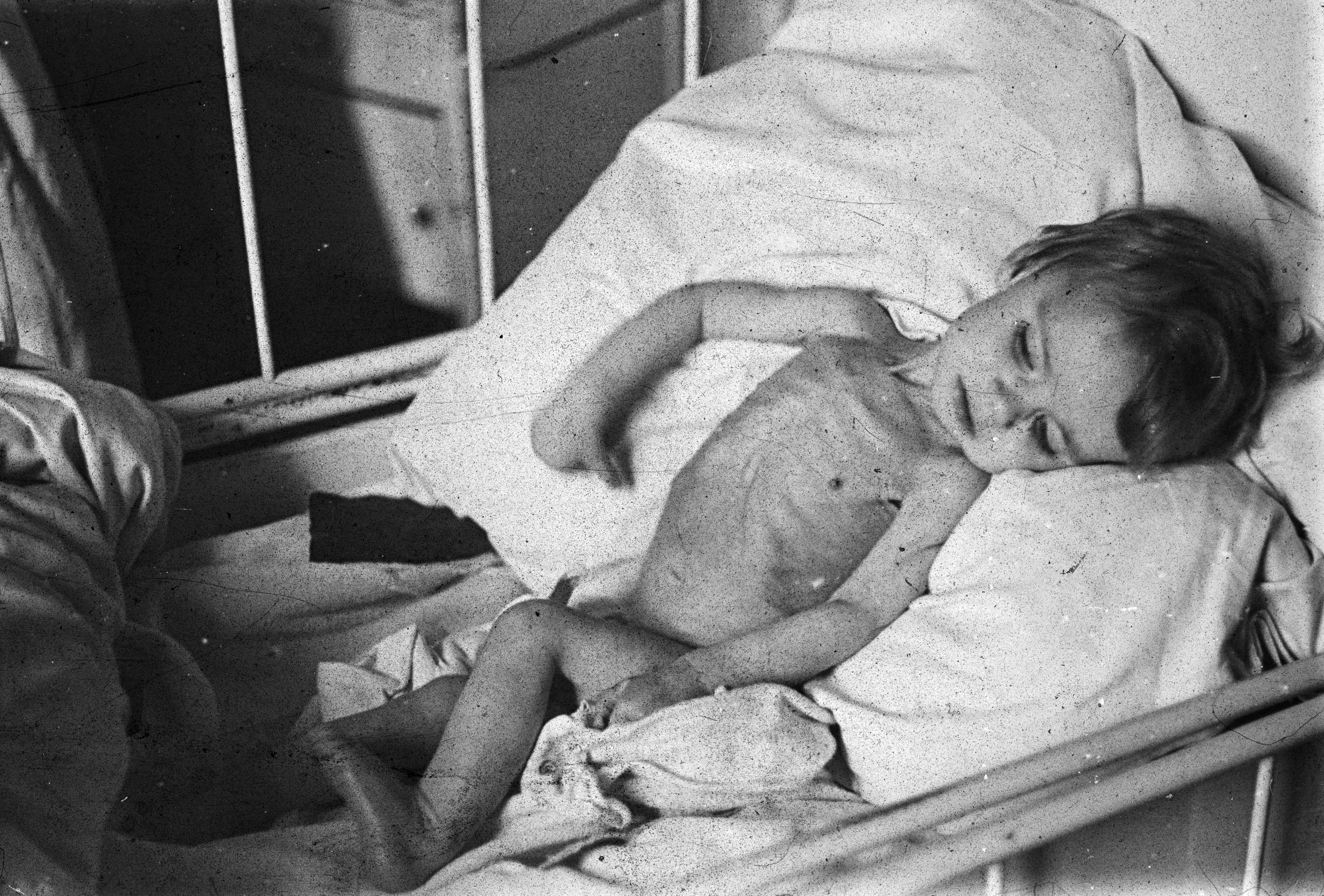
Malnourished Dutch child in The Hague

The failure of Operation Market Garden created a wave of refugees from the battlefield—some 100,000 from Arnhem alone—and ensured that the territory still under German control would endure the winter of 1944-45 with virtually no material support. In response to a general railway strike ordered by the Dutch government-in-exile near the end of 1944, the Germans cut off all food and fuel shipments to the western provinces in which 4.5 million people lived.

The winter in Europe was one of the coldest in a hundred years, causing a shortage of water as well as food. The resulting famine is commonly known as the Hongerwinter (literally, "hunger winter"). Trees began to be chopped down en masse for cooking fires, which caused the Germans to close many public parks; likewise, many abandoned buildings were demolished so their wooden frames could be burned. "Hunger journeys" (hongertochten) were common as people roamed the country to scavenge or trade for food. As the end of 1944 approached, supplies had diminished until the only ration cards issued were for one Dutch pound (500 grams) of bread per person per day. Even this was not always attainable, and residents lined up overnight at bakeries in hopes of bread in the morning. By the onset of winter, some three million Dutch residents were facing starvation. Fresh water was also hard to obtain; efforts were made to tow blocks of ice down the rivers into the cities for melting.

The famine ultimately caused up to 30,000 casualties of starvation, exhaustion, cold, and disease, and 18,000 people starved to death.

After negotiations with the Germans, on 28 January, a Swedish cargo ship bearing food docked in the northern port of Delfzijl, the first formal relief action of the Hunger Winter. But the situation remained grim in most of the country: by the spring of 1945, food kitchens could provide only a few hundred calories per person per day, and the Central Kitchen in Amsterdam shut down completely at the end of April. At this time a loaf of bread cost 200 times what it had a year earlier. Widespread relief did not arrive until early May 1945.

=== Bombing of the Bezuidenhout ===
On 3 March 1945, the British Royal Air Force mistakenly bombed the densely populated Bezuidenhout neighbourhood in the Dutch city of The Hague. The British bomber crews had intended to bomb the Haagse Bos ("Forest of the Hague") district where the Germans had installed V-2 launching facilities that had been used to attack English cities. However, the pilots were issued with the wrong coordinates, so the navigational instruments of the bombers had been set incorrectly. Combined with fog and clouds which obscured their vision, the bombs were instead dropped on the Bezuidenhout residential neighbourhood. At the time, the neighbourhood was more densely populated than usual with evacuees from The Hague and Wassenaar; 511 residents were killed and approximately 30,000 were left homeless.

=== The Texel Uprising ===
On the night of 5–6 April, a contingent of Georgian troops, former prisoners of war who had been serving in the Wehrmacht, rose up against the Germans on the occupied island of Texel and killed some 200 soldiers. The Germans gradually retook the island over the next five weeks, with violence lasting even after the German surrender, until Canadian forces arrived on 17 May; this made the Texel uprising one of the last battles of World War II in Europe.

=== Liberation ===
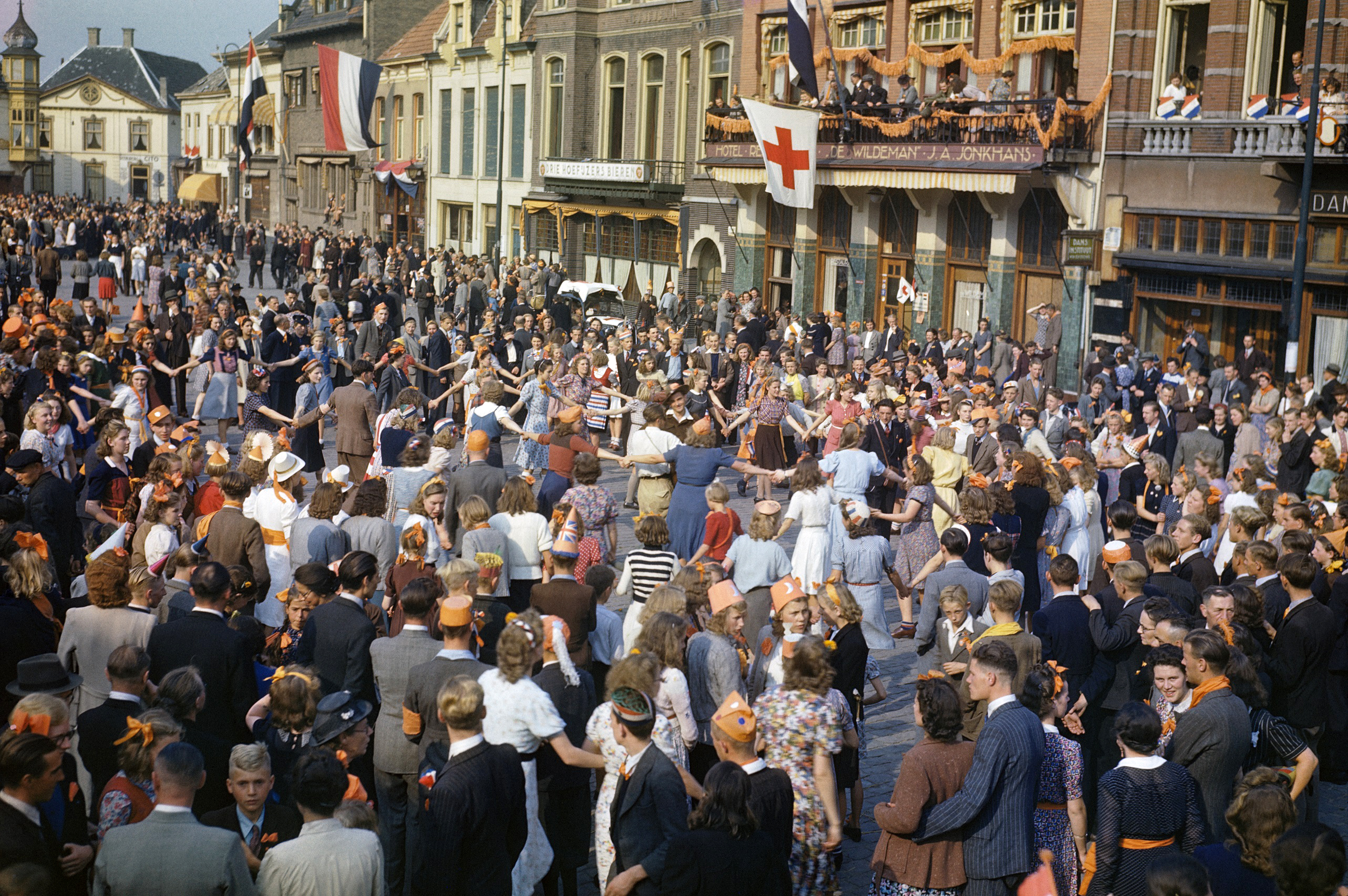
Civilians dancing in the square of Eindhoven, the first major town in Netherlands to be liberated. Eindhoven was later bombed by the Luftwaffe.

After crossing the Rhine at Wesel and Rees, Canadian, British and Polish forces entered the Netherlands from the east. The liberation of the north began on 11–12 April 1945 when the 48th Highlanders of Canada crossed the IJssel, enabling the First Canadian Army to liberate Arnhem and Apeldoorn. Within a week, Groningen and Friesland in the northeast had been liberated, leaving only the population centres in the Randstad under German control. Dutch Resistance fighters wearing distinctive armbands served as impromptu security officers in liberated areas. Notable battles during the movement were the Battle of Groningen and the Battle of Otterlo.

During Operation Amherst, Allied troops advanced to the North Netherlands. To support the advance of the II Canadian Corps, French paratroopers were dropped into Friesland and Drenthe and were the first Allied troops to reach Friesland. The French successfully captured the crucial Stokersverlaat Bridge. The region was successfully liberated shortly after.

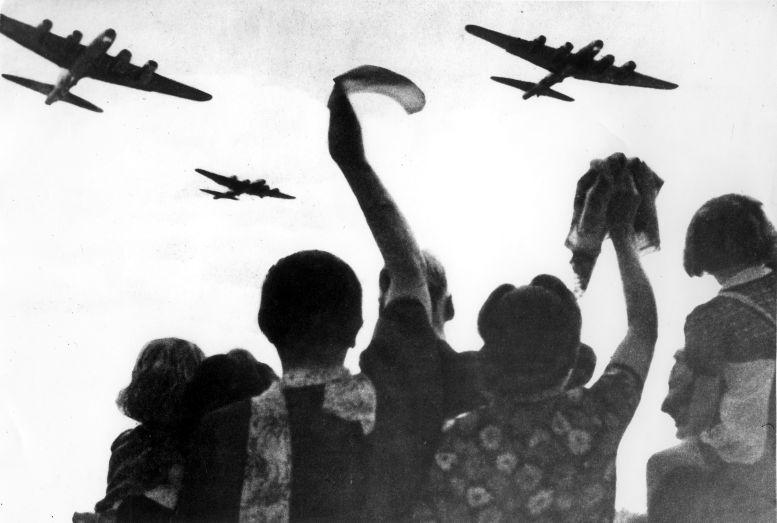
Dutch civilians waving to allied bombers during the liberation of the Netherlands in 1945

As the Allied advance continued, German forces permitted further humanitarian relief. Between 29 April and 8 May, Operations Manna, Chowhound, and Faust were undertaken to deliver food to Dutch civilians behind German lines by air and ground.

German forces in northwest Europe had already surrendered on 4 May, but Royal Canadian Regiment General Charles Foulkes sought an explicit surrender of remaining forces in The Netherlands. On 5 May—known today as Liberation Day—Generaloberst Johannes Blaskowitz did so at Hotel de Wereld in Wageningen. At that point, only a few of the Wadden Islands in the north were still defended by the Wehrmacht. The final capitulation of Germany occurred three days later on 8 May.

Some sporadic violence continued throughout the country, with some German troops refusing to surrender. On 7 May, the day before Canadian forces arrived, a group of German soldiers opened fire on civilians celebrating on Dam Square in Amsterdam, killing 32. The same day there was a firefight at Amsterdam Centraal station. During victory celebrations in Oldenzaal on 8 May, a group of boys exploded leftover German grenades and created an explosion that killed nine and injured 60. The last German holdouts, about 600 soldiers isolated on the northern island of Schiermonnikoog, finally surrendered on 11 June.

After being liberated, Dutch citizens began taking the law into their own hands, like in other liberated countries, such as France. Collaborators and Dutch women who had relationships with men of the German occupying force, called "Moffenmeiden" were abused and humiliated in public, usually by having their heads shaved and painted orange. There have been attempts to ask for apologies for this abuse.

== Deaths caused by the war ==
Estimates of deaths resulting from World War II vary, but of a total population of 8.8 million, one source cites 237,300 deaths. The largest number of deaths was 104,000 Jews who died or were killed in German concentration camps. Fifty thousand people are estimated to have died because of inadequate medical care, 30,000 of 550,000 Dutch men forced to work in Germany died, 23,000 died in air raids by both Germans and Allies, 18,000 died of starvation in the Hunger Winter, 5,000 Dutch died in prison or concentration camps, 4,500 Dutch soldiers were killed defending the Netherlands during the German invasion, and 2,800 people were executed, including nineteen women. In addition to those figures, 10,000 Dutch men fighting for the Germans were killed. Allied soldiers killed in the liberation of the Netherlands from the Germans totalled 50,000. During the war nearly half of the Dutch merchant fleet was destroyed and as a result a total of 3400 crew members died.

== Postwar ==
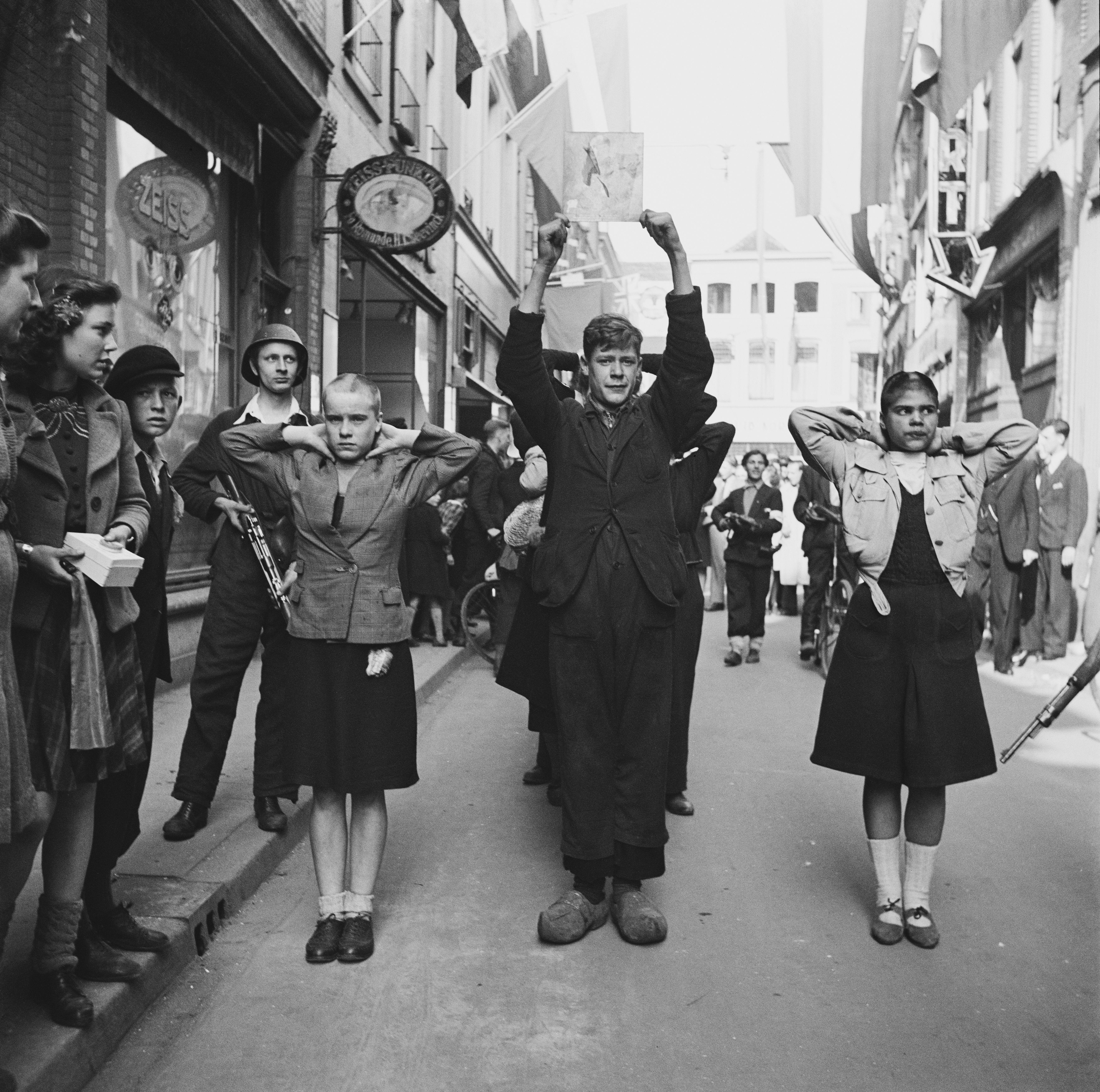
Collaborators and moffenmeiden being rounded up and publicly humiliated by resistance members following the Liberation

The "Hunger Winter" was followed by the "Sweetest Spring" (Liefste lente) and "Canadian Summer" (Canadese zomer). Almost immediately after liberation, food supplies improved and rations were restored, including coupons for children for new clothing. Well-fed Canadian soldiers, stocked with chocolate and cigarettes, proved attractive to Dutch women; a popular song at the time was Trees heeft een Canadees ("Trees [a woman's name] Got a Canadian").

The Netherlands began rebuilding in 1945, but basic services were not available for some time, and heavily damaged areas had restricted access to prevent looting. Heavily affected cities included Rotterdam, Nijmegen, and Arnhem; of about 25,000 homes in Arnhem, only 145 remained intact. German prisoners of war were compelled to clear agricultural areas of landmines. Large-scale reconstruction, called Wederopbouw, did not begin until the Marshall Plan was implemented in 1948 and continued until the mid-1950s.

Thousands of arbeidsinzet labourers returned home from Germany during 1945 and were variously welcomed home or treated as collaborators. The Landelijke Organistatie, which had previously helped those in hiding, now helped to register onderduikers and return them to their homes within or outside of The Netherlands.

Dutch citizens dug up silver, radios, and other contraband from their hiding places. To restore the financial system and root out war profiteers, Dutch bank accounts were temporarily frozen and new Dutch guilder banknotes were issued, a process called "sanitation".

In the years immediately after the war, Dutch authorities encouraged emigration to countries like the United States, Canada, and Australia. As much as 3.5% of the total Dutch population emigrated during this period.

=== Collaborators ===
Following liberation, the NSB was banned. Arthur Seyss-Inquart and Anton Mussert were arrested, convicted of treason, and executed in 1946 along with other occupation leaders. Hanns Albin Rauter was captured while in hospital from the resistance ambush at Weste Hoeve. He was held responsible for the deportation of 110,000 Jews and another 300,000 forced labourers from The Netherlands. Rauter was executed in 1949.

Some accused of collaborating with the Germans were lynched or otherwise punished without trial. Up to 6,000 collaborators were initially interned in Amsterdam; however, a great number of these were restored to their positions in government and infrastructure, while active resistance members sometimes found themselves sidelined. Some were proven to have been wrongly arrested and were cleared of charges, sometimes after they had been held in custody for a long period of time.

Women who had sex with, befriended, or collaborated with German occupiers—slandered as Moffenhoeren, or "Kraut-whores"—had their heads publicly shaved.

Men who had fought with the Germans in the Wehrmacht or Waffen-SS were used to clear minefields and suffered losses accordingly. Others were sentenced by courts for treason.

=== Holocaust aftermath ===
Many Holocaust survivors returned to their homes to find them occupied by private citizens or public officials. Descendants of the displaced continue to advocate for compensation for the lost property. In addition, many Dutch Holocaust survivors were spied on or required to pay taxes for the time they were away.

The bank balances of Dutch Jews who were killed were still the subject of legal proceedings more than 70 years after the end of the war.

In 2017, the Dutch Red Cross offered its "deep apologies" for its failure to act to protect Jews, Sinti, Roma, and political prisoners during the war after the publication of a study that it had commissioned from the NIOD Institute for War, Holocaust and Genocide Studies.

=== Territorial changes ===
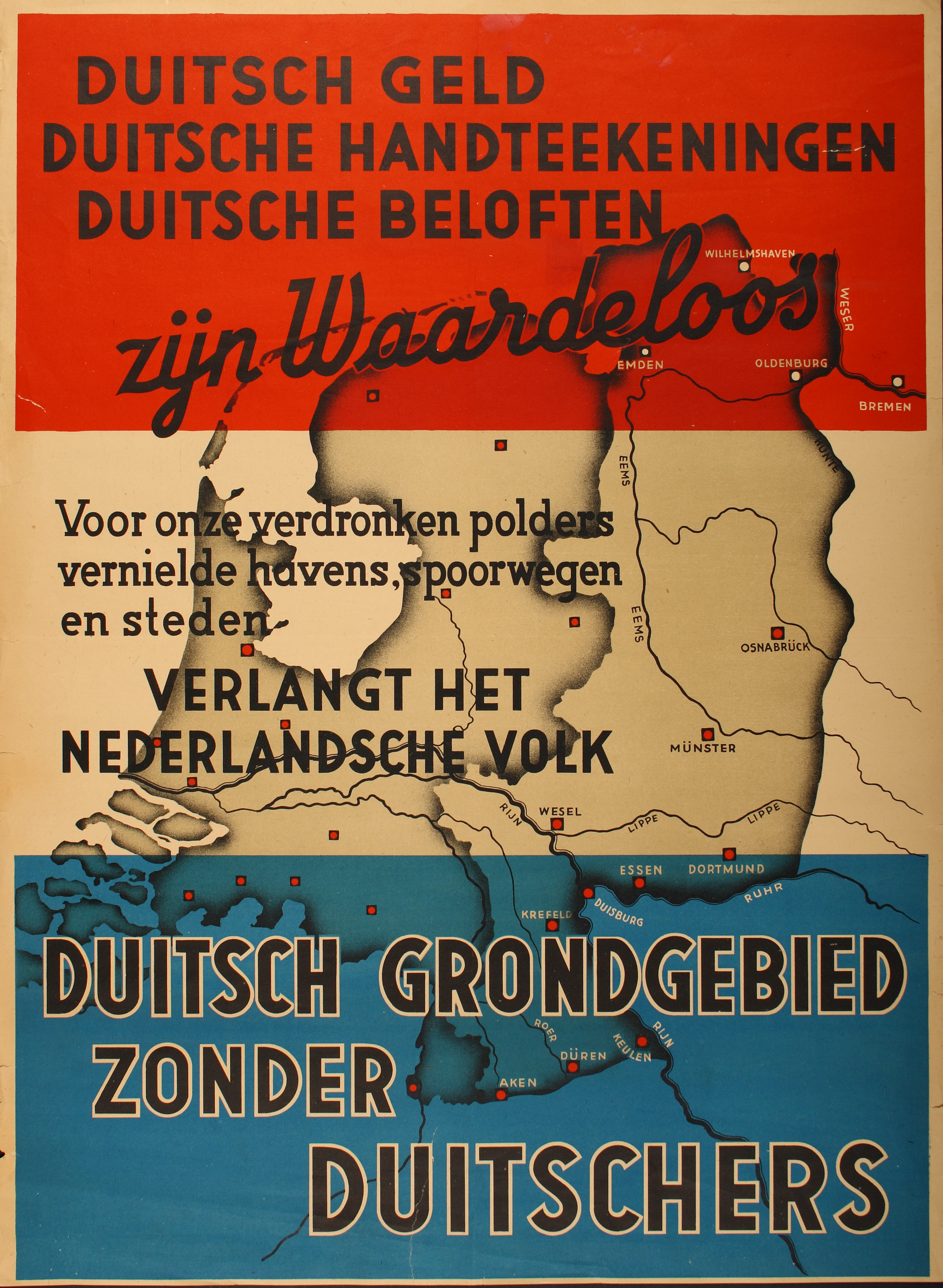
1945 Dutch propaganda poster, depicting maximalist demands for "German soil without Germans"

The Dutch government initially developed plans to annex part of Germany (the Bakker-Schut Plan), which would substantially increase the country's land area. The German population would be expelled or "Dutchified". The plan was dropped after an Allied refusal. Two small villages were added to the Netherlands in 1949 and returned in 1963. One successfully-implemented plan was Operation Black Tulip, the deportation of all holders of German passports from the Netherlands, numbering several thousand.

The end of the war also meant the final loss of the Dutch East Indies. After the surrender of the Japanese in the Dutch East Indies, Indonesian nationalists fought a four-year war of independence against Dutch and at first British Commonwealth forces, which eventually led to the Dutch recognition of the independence of Indonesia under pressure of the United States. Many Dutch and Indonesians then emigrated or returned to the Netherlands.

=== Remembrance ===
World War II left many lasting effects on Dutch society. On 4 May, the Dutch commemorate those who died during the war, and all wars since. Among the living, there are many who still bear the emotional scars of the war from both the first and the second generation. In 2000, the government was still granting 24,000 people an annual compensatory payment although that also included victims from later wars, such as the Korean War.

In January 2020, for the first time a Dutch government has apologised for the fact that civil servants acted as accomplices to the German occupiers.

The National Holocaust Names Memorial (in Amsterdam) was dedicated by King Willem-Alexander in September 2021.

== See also ==
- Netherlands in World War I
- Chronological overview of the liberation of Dutch cities and towns during World War II
- Dutch resistance
- Englandspiel
- List of Dutch military equipment of World War II
- Military history of the Netherlands during World War II
- Corrie ten Boom
- Jan de Hartog
- Philip Slier
- Maurice Frankenhuis
- Canada-Netherlands relations
- Liberation Day (Netherlands)
- Suicide in the Netherlands in World War II

== Sources ==
- Ambrose, Stephen (2001), The Wild Blue : The Men and Boys Who Flew the B-24s Over Germany 1944–45, Simon & Schuster, ISBN 978-0-7432-0339-5
- Atkinson, Rick (2013), The Guns at Last Light, New York: Henry Holt, ISBN 978-0-8050-6290-8
- Ministerie van Buitenlandse zaken (January 24, 1994). "Gedwongen prostitutie van Nederlandse vrouwen in voormalig Nederlands-Indië [Enforced prostitution of Dutch women in the former Dutch East Indies]". Handelingen Tweede Kamer der Staten-Generaal [Hansard Dutch Lower House] (in Dutch). 23607 (1). ISSN 0921-7371. Archived from the original on September 27, 2007.
