= Suicide in the Netherlands in World War II =

During World War II, the Netherlands experienced a significant increase in suicide rates. The largest surge occurred immediately following the German invasion of the Netherlands from 10 to 15 May 1940. During this period, 388 individuals committed suicide, with hundreds more attempting to do so. The majority of these suicides, 211 in total, were among the Jewish population. The implementation of measures against Jews, particularly the deportations, contributed to subsequent peaks in suicide rates. Around the end of the war, at least 113 collaborators committed suicide in the Netherlands.

== German invasion ==
Suicides in the period 1936-1949
Year	Total	Jews (Note: Those considered "full Jews" by race laws of the German occupier)
1936	767	avg. 29
1937	749	avg. 29
1938	833	avg. 29
1939	745	avg. 29
1940	1046	257
1941	661	37
1942	901	247
1943	855	169
1944	653	
1945	1011	
1946	852	
1947	701	
1948	697	
1949	674	

211 Jews committed suicide in May 1940. Notable Jews who committed suicide during this period included Emanuel Boekman, Jacob van Gelderen and Louis Fles.

177 of those who committed suicide were not of Jewish decent. Among them were Menno ter Braak and Willem Adriaan Bonger.

== Collaborators ==
In the period 1944–1947, 113 collaborators have been identified who committed suicide. Notable examples were Meinoud Rost van Tonningen and Robert van Genechten.

== See also ==
- Mass suicides in Nazi Germany
