= Finkelstein =

Finkelstein (Hebrew: פֿינק(ע)לשׁטײַן or פינקלשׁט(י)ין, Russian: Финкельштейн, French: Finchelstein) is a German and Yiddish surname originating from Old High German funko (spark) and stein (stone).

Fünkelstein meant pyrite (George J. Adler, A Dictionary of the German and English Languages, 1848).

== Notable people ==
Notable people with the surname include:

- Abraham Finkelstein alias Arthur Fields (1884–1953), American singer and songwriter
- Amy Finkelstein (born 1973), American professor of economics
- Anthony Finkelstein (born 1959), British software engineer
- Arthur J. Finkelstein (1945–2017), American political strategist
- Avram Finkelstein, American gay rights activist
- Ben-Ami Finkelstein (1910–1975), Swiss psychiatrist
- Bernie Finkelstein (born 1944), Canadian music executive and talent manager
- Beatrice Finkelstein, American nutritionist
- Claire Finkelstein, American legal scholar
- Clive Finkelstein (c. 1939–2021), Australian computer scientist
- Daniel Finkelstein (born 1962), British journalist and politician
- David Finkelstein (1929–2016), American physicist
- Eric Finkelstein (born 1970), American health economist
- Federico Finchelstein (born 1975), Argentine historian
- Gabriel Finkelstein (born 1963), American professor of history
- Hans Finkelstein (1885–1938), German chemist
- Heinrich Finkelstein (1865–1942), German pediatrician
- Howard Finkelstein, American lawyer
- Israel Finkelstein (born 1949), Israeli archaeologist
- Jacob Finkelstein alias Jackie Fields (1908–1987), American boxer
- Jerry Finkelstein (1916–2012), American publisher, businessman and political power broker
- Levana Finkelstein (born 1947), Israeli actress
- Louis Finkelstein (1895–1991), American Talmud scholar
- Louis Finkelstein (artist) (1923–2000), American painter and academic
- Max Finkelstein (1884–1940), American policeman from New York
- Meir Finkelstein, Israeli-American cantor and composer of Jewish liturgical music
- Mel Finkelstein, American photojournalist
- Menachem Finkelstein (born 1951), Israeli judge
- Mendel Finkelstein (c.1878–1949), Australian cinema entrepreneur, founder of the Greater Wondergraph Company
- Nat Finkelstein (1933–2009), American photographer and photojournalist
- Norman Finkelstein (born 1953), American political scientist and writer
- Norman H. Finkelstein (1941–2024), American author and educator
- Norman Finkelstein (poet) (born 1954), poet and writer
- Peter Max Finkelstein alias Peter Max (1937–2026), American artist
- Raymond Finkelstein (born 1946), Australian lawyer and judge
- Salo Finkelstein (1896/7–unknown), Russian-American mental calculator
- Samuel Finkelstein (1895–1942), Polish painter
- Shimcha Finkelstein (1917–1987), Polish-Israeli table tennis player
- Sidney Finkelstein (1909–1974), American writer
- Tamara Finkelstein (born 1967), British civil servant
- Vic Finkelstein (1938–2011), South African-British disabled activist and writer
- William Zorach alias Finkelstein (1889–1966), Lithuanian-American sculptor, painter, printmaker and writer

== See also ==
- Finkel
- Eddington-Finkelstein coordinates
- Finkelstein reaction, named after Hans Finkelstein
- Finkelstein's test, a method to diagnose DeQuervain's syndrome
- Garfinkel
- Garfunkel
