= Ludwik Finkelstein =

British engineer and Holocaust survivor (1929–2011)

Ludwik Finkelstein OBE FREng
- Born: Ludwik Finkelstein; 6 December 1929; Lvov, Poland
- Died: 27 August 2011 (aged 81); London, United Kingdom
- Citizenship: British
- Education: City, University of London (PhD), University of London (MSc), (BSc)
- Awards: Queen's Silver Jubilee Medal (1977); OBE (1990)
- Scientific career
- Fields: Measurement science, instrumentation, and systems engineering
- Workplaces: University of London; City, University of London

Ludwik Finkelstein OBE FREng (6 December 1929 – 27 August 2011) was a British engineer and academic known for his significant contributions to the fields of measurement science, instrumentation, and systems engineering. A researcher and educator, Finkelstein's work bridged theoretical advancements and practical applications in engineering.

== Early life and education ==
Finkelstein was born in Lvov, Poland. In 1941, during World War II, he and his family were deported to Ukraine by Soviet forces. After the war, the family relocated to the United Kingdom, where Finkelstein pursued his education and built a successful career.

He completed his BSc Degree in Physics and Mathematics from the University of London in 1951. After which, he started working at the Mining Research Establishment of the National Coal Board while studying electrical engineering and physics, where he earned an MSc from the University of London in 1959. He then earned his doctorate and became deeply involved in advancing systems engineering and instrumentation, with a long tenure at City, University of London.

== Career ==
Finkelstein served as a professor at the University of London and established himself as an expert in measurement science, control systems, and the application of cybernetics to engineering problems. His research emphasized practical solutions and technological innovation, and he became a pioneer in connecting theoretical concepts with industrial applications.

Beyond academia, he held key advisory roles, including serving as the chief regional adviser for Greater London for the Home Office's scientific service for Home Defence. In this capacity, he contributed to scientific and technological preparedness national strategies. He became the Pro – Vice Chancellor of Northampton College of Advance Technology from 1991–1994.

== Personal life ==
Finkelstein married Mirjam Finkelstein, the daughter of Alfred Wiener, founder of the Wiener Holocaust Library. Together, they had three children: Anthony, Daniel, and Tamara.

== Awards and recognitions ==
He was awarded the Queen's Silver Jubilee Medal in 1977 and appointed Officer of the Order of the British Empire (OBE) in 1990. He was a Fellow of the Royal Academy of Engineering and held Honorary Doctorates from City University, London, and St. Petersburg Technical University.

== See also ==
- Hitler, Stalin, Mum and Dad, a 2023 memoir by Daniel Finkelstein
