= Garfunkel =

Garfunkel is a Jewish surname that derives from Yiddish גאָרפֿינקל (gorfinkl), German Karfunkel, both ultimately from Latin Carbuncle (an archaic term for a number of red gemstones, usually red garnet), and may refer to:

- Art Garfunkel (born 1941), American singer, poet and actor, best known as half of the folk music duo Simon & Garfunkel
  - Garfunkel (album), 1988 compilation album by Art Garfunkel
- Jerome Garfunkel, American computer scientist notable for his work on COBOL, brother of Art Garfunkel
- Sol Garfunkel (born 1943), American mathematician
- Leib Garfunkel (1896–1976), Jewish advocate, journalist, politician in Lithuania
- Garfunkel and Oates, American comedy-folk duo being Riki Lindhome and Kate Micucci
  - Riki Lindhome a.k.a. Garfunkel
  - Garfunkel and Oates (TV series), American comedy television series created by and starring the members of the titular musical duo above
- Garfunkel's Restaurant, small chain of restaurants largely in the London, England area, but with branches in both Bath and Edinburgh

== See also ==
- Karfunkel
- Garfinkel
- Finkelstein
- Finkel
