= Garfinkel =

Garfinkel is a Yiddish surname with variants Garfinkle, Garfinkiel, Garfinckel, Gurfinkel, Gorfinkel, Garfield etc. Notable people with the surname include:

- Alan Garfinkel, professor
- Charles B. Garfinkel (1890–1969), New York assemblyman
- Harold Garfinkel (1917–2011), American sociologist
- Jack Garfinkel (1918–2013), American basketball player
- Lenora Garfinkel (1930–2020), American architect
- Marian Garfinkel (1932–2020), American yoga practitioner who pioneered the use of yoga to treat carpal tunnel
- Simson Garfinkel (born 1965), American computer scientist, journalist and writer specializing in the field of computer security
- Yosef Garfinkel (born 1956), Israeli archaeologist

== Garfield ==
- Andrew Garfield (born 1983), English and American actor

== Other variant forms ==
Garfinkle

- Eddie Garfinkle, American college football coach
- John Garfield (born Garfinkle; 1913–1952), American actor
- Norton Garfinkle (born 1931), American economist
- Richard Garfinkle (born 1961), American science-fiction author

Garfinckel

- Julius Garfinckel (born Garfinkel; 1872–1936), American merchant, founder of Washington, D.C.–based department store chain, Garfinckel's

Gurfinkel

- David Gurfinkel (born 1938), Israeli cinematographer
- Goldie Steinberg (née Gurfinkel), Moldovan-born American supercentenarian
- Josefa Gurfinkel (1919–1997), Soviet chess master
- Yisrael Guri (born Gurfinkel; 1893–1965), Russian-born Israeli politician

Gorfinkel

- Jordan B. Gorfinkel, aka "Gorf," (born July 7, 1967), American comic book creator, newspaper cartoonist, animation and multi-media entertainment producer.

== See also ==
- Garfunkel
- Finkelstein
- Finkel
