= Margarete Adam =

German feminist philosopher

- Born: 13 July 1885 (Germany)
- Died: January 1946 (aged 60); East Berlin, Germany
- Occupations: Philosopher; professor; Writer

Academic background
- Education: Hamburg University
- Thesis: (1925)
- Doctoral advisor: Ernst Cassirer

Margarete Adam (13 July 1885 – January 1946) was a German feminist philosopher and university teacher.

She fell foul of the authorities after the 1933 Machtergreifung because she had already been critical of the Nazi Party in print and then, after the Nazis took power, got into the habit of writing to senior army commanders and others in the public eye, advocating the overthrow of Hitler. She died early in January 1946 as a result of mistreatment suffered in German jails between 1937 and 1944.

== Biography ==
Margarete Adam came from a traditional German family, and was a committed Roman Catholic. She studied philosophy. During the 1920s she contributed articles to Die Frau, at that time Germany's leading feminist magazine. She received her doctorate from Hamburg University in 1925, after which she accepted a teaching position with the university.

In 1929 she wrote an essay, published early in 1930 by the Centralverein deutscher Staatsbürger jüdischen Glaubens (National Association of German Citizens of Jewish Faith), in which she asserted that no government, even the most anti-Semitic one, would gain popular support for the disenfranchisement of Jews as citizens, concluding that anti-Semitism was bound to decline and philo-semitism to grow. A compounding poignant irony followed towards the end of 1930 when she admitted that she had been one of thousands of women who had voted for the Nazi Party in 1930. She had done this, she wrote, only after much soul searching, and despite disagreeing with their anti-Semitic rhetoric, because the Nazis were the only party committed to revising the punitive terms of the 1919, Treaty of Versailles, and the only party to include among their objectives the fights against corruption and against Bolshevism.

Back in 1925 Adam's doctoral dissertation had been supervised by Ernst Cassirer. After the Nazis took power in the January 1933 Machtergreifung, Cassirer applied to the Hamburg university authorities in April 1933 for permission to resign, on account of his Jewish provenance: he emigrated, initially to Oxford, England. It was no longer possible to believe that no government would ever gain popular support (or at least popular connivance) for the disenfranchisement of Jews.

Margarete Adam was not Jewish, but she continued to make her views on the Nazi Party's anti-Semitism known, and during 1933 her teaching contract with Hamburg University was withdrawn. Her position became one of opposition bordering on "resistance" in what became, during the first half of 1933, a one-party dictatorship, with anti-Semitism a core underpinning of public policy. After 1934 she campaigned (without success) to bring the perpetrators of the Röhm Putsch before the courts. She addressed letters and leaflets to senior army officers and others in positions of power and influence, seeking to persuade them to get rid of Hitler.

Adam was arrested in 1937. She was sentenced for high treason to eight or nine (Note: Sources differ.) years in prison. She served her sentence in the women's prison in Lübeck-Lauerhof and at a prison in Cottbus where she was held in solitary confinement. In 1944 she was declared unfit for imprisonment and transferred to the hospital at Roßthal on the south side of Dresden. Later she was moved to the Charité (hospital) in east Berlin, during the final part of January 1946. Sources assert that her death resulted from her lengthy imprisonment.
