= Occupational therapy in the management of seasonal affective disorder =

Occupational therapy is used to manage the issues caused by seasonal affective disorder (SAD). Occupational therapists assist with the management of SAD through the incorporation of a variety of healthcare disciplines into therapeutic practice. Potential patients with SAD are assessed, treated, and evaluated primarily using treatments such as drug therapies, light therapies, and psychological therapies. Therapists are often involved in designing an individualised treatment plan that most effectively meets the client's goals and needs around their responsiveness to a variety of treatments.

Occupational therapists often have the primary responsibility of informing individuals with SAD of the etiology, prevalence, symptoms, and occupational performance issues caused by the disorder, as well as possibilities for positive intervention. The main symptom of SAD targeted is low energy levels, remedied with fatigue management and energy conservation strategies.

== Biomedical approaches ==
The most common biomedical approaches used by occupational therapists in the treatment of SAD are light therapy; the use of exposure to various types of light, and pharmacotherapy.

=== Light therapy ===
Bright light therapy, commonly referred to as phototherapy, has been documented in multiple studies to be an effective treatment of SAD. A study completed in 2009 revealed that as little as twenty minutes of light exposure can improve the mood of those with SAD. Additionally, it has been found that bright light (at a minimum of 2500 lux "at eye level") has a higher rate of effectiveness than dimmer light levels in protecting against the "mood lowering" symptom that is characteristic of SAD. Due to its high success rates, it is regarded as a first-line treatment for SAD in Canadian, American, and international clinical guidelines.

The most widely available method of administering phototherapy to those exhibiting symptoms of SAD is through a light therapy box, which is a commercially available device designed to emit light of a brightness and colour temperature similar to sunlight. Modern devices most frequently use light-emitting diodes in either a lightbox format or alternatively in the form of a wearable device resembling a visor or glasses. Devices that emit blue-enriched white light or devices emitting only blue, only green, or a combination of blue and green wavelengths have been found as the most effective in treating SAD. However, light boxes are not currently regulated by the U.S. Food and Drug Administration (FDA), therefore it is advised to those seeking to purchase one for light therapy to exercise caution when buying.

The role of Occupational Therapists in the use of phototherapy when treating SAD is to ensure that clients are aware of the typical usage guidelines provided to users of light boxes and fulfil the need for clinical monitoring to ensure the appropriate doses of light by their clients. Studies have shown effective doses ranging between 3,000 lux, 2 hours a day, for 5 weeks to 10,000 lux, 30 minutes a day, for 8 weeks. As effective doses of light therapy vary depending on the individual, occupational therapists are often responsible for ascertaining the most effective levels of light therapy for an individual patient. Since commercial light boxes are often not regulated by law, Occupational therapists provide necessary medical consultation and advice for selecting and using the boxes. As only approximately 41% of SAD patients comply with clinical practice guidelines and use light therapy as recommended, occupational therapists provide support for the effective incorporation of phototherapy into client's daily routines while complying with clinical guidelines.

=== Medications ===
Antidepressant medication has been shown to be effective in treating various forms of depression caused by seasonal affective disorder. Bupropion, a norepinephrine-dopamine reuptake inhibitor, was approved by the FDA for the prevention of seasonal affective disorder. Other types of antidepressant medication used to treat SAD include selective serotonin reuptake inhibitors (SSRIs) such as fluoxetine and sertraline, which also appear to be effective. While occupational therapists are unable to prescribe these medications, they play a role in informing clients of how these prescribed medications can decrease acute symptoms of SAD and lead to enhanced engagement in daily occupations. There is also evidence that psychosocial approaches to therapy that occupational therapists can provide, such as cognitive and behavioural interventions, may have more enduring effects than biomedical interventions.

==== Effectiveness ====
Light therapy has been shown in studies to have mixed results; in some studies, 20% to 50% of those diagnosed with SAD did not gain adequate relief from the use of light therapy. Individuals may also explore alternative treatments if they are unable to commit to the time required and the recurrence of the treatment that is necessary. However, in a study comparing the effectiveness of light therapy and the antidepressant medication fluoxetine, both treatments were found to be both effective and tolerable in the treatment of SAD.

== Psychosocial approaches ==
Occupational therapists also implement psychotherapeutic interventions, which follow psychosocial rehabilitation and recovery-based approaches.

The precise roles of occupational therapists in psychosocial rehabilitation include the following:

- Identifying a client's psychosocial issues, as well as any strengths and limitations they possess that may be associated with the condition;
- Assessing a client's readiness, motivation, and belief in their abilities to make changes in their lives to manage SAD;
- Identifying what is meaningful to the client throughout their management of the disorder;
- Identifying social support systems that are available to help the client achieve their goals and manage SAD.

Occupational therapists utilise guiding frameworks such as the Canadian Model of Occupational Performance or the Model of Human Occupation to assist their clients in reaching their set rehabilitation goals and identify areas of occupational performance that are affected by the symptoms associated with SAD.

Alongside those offered by occupational therapists, several methods of intervention are relevant in the psychosocial approach to managing SAD. Consequently, an occupational therapist will frequently be a part of an interdisciplinary team of health care providers who are involved with assisting clients with the management of SAD. Occupational therapists specifically promote psychosocial rehabilitation and recovery, addressing the underlying symptoms associated with SAD, while other members of an interdisciplinary team may be driven largely by more medical methods of management.

=== Group therapy ===
Occupational therapists in mental health settings often lead therapy groups for both inpatients and outpatients with mood disorders. Some topics within group therapy that target occupational performance issues relate to SAD. These topics could include:

- Stress management
- Weight control and nutrition
- Smoking cessation
- Substance abuse
- Time management
- Social skills and networking
- Wintertime activities
- Sleep education
- Self-esteem
- Sexual health

These group therapy sessions are guided by a number of different theoretical and therapeutic frames of references, though all use methods that are supported by research. Some of the more common approaches used by Occupational therapists when framing and implementing interventions for clients with SAD include Cognitive Behavioural Therapy, Mindfulness-Based Cognitive Therapy, Behavioural Activation, Problem-Solving Therapy, and Outdoor Therapy.

=== Cognitive behavioural therapy ===
Cognitive behavioural therapy (CBT) is used by occupational therapists to treat SAD and other mood disorders. Originally developed by American psychiatrists Aaron T. Beck and Augustus John Rush, psychologist Brian Shaw, and counsellor Garry Emery, CBT helps clients identify the expectations and interpretations that can lead them towards depression and anxiety, adjust to a reality free from these expectations, and consequently overcome their avoidances and inhibitions. When implemented appropriately, it can cause change to patients' cognitive processes, which has the ability to then correspond with changes in their feelings and behaviours. CBT for SAD specifically focuses on the early identification of negative anticipatory thoughts and behaviour changes associated with the winter season, and thus helps clients develop coping skills to address them.

Occupational therapists use cognitive behavioural therapy to encourage clients with SAD to engage in enjoyable activities in the winter months as a method of activating changes to behaviour, and help people think more positively to enforce cognitive restructuring. If qualified, occupational therapists can also deliver training groups designed to provide those with SAD behavioural therapy skills that will allow them to manage their disorder. The skills that occupational therapists teach in these groups have a direct impact on occupational performance issues and can include:

- Developing a repertoire of wintertime leisure interests;
- Using diaries to record automatic negative thoughts;
- Creating a balanced activity level;
- Improving time management skills;
- Problem solving about situations that initiate negative thinking; and
- Setting goals and plans for maintaining gains and preventing relapse.

==== Effectiveness ====
Cognitive behavioural therapy has been shown in studies to have the ability to lead to a significant decrease in levels of depression amongst those with SAD. There have been no direct comparisons made between the effectiveness of CBT and antidepressant medication specifically for SAD. Regarding non-seasonal depression, CBT is believed to be equally as effective as antidepressant medication in terms of acute distress reduction; however, the effects of therapy are shown to be longer lasting than antidepressant medication. CBT is effective in treating both mild and more severely depressed patients, and is shown to prevent or delay the relapse of depressive symptoms better than other treatments for depression. There are no known adverse physical side effects of CBT in comparison to biomedical approaches, which could benefit patients that experience negative effects from biomedical interventions.

=== Mindfulness-based cognitive therapy (MBCT) ===
Mindfulness-based cognitive therapy (MBCT) is an intervention that aims to increase meta-cognitive awareness to the negative thoughts and feelings associated with relapses of major depression. Unlike cognitive behavioural therapy, MBCT does not emphasize changing thought contents or core beliefs related to depression. It instead focuses on meta-cognitive awareness techniques, which are said to change the relationship between one's thoughts and feelings.

The act of passively and repetitively focusing one's attention on the symptoms, meanings, causes, and consequences of the negative emotional state of depression is called rumination. MBCT aims to reduce rumination by addressing the cognitive patterns associated with negative thinking and cultivating mindfulness of these patterns through meditation and self-awareness exercises that will give patients the ability to identify them. Once awareness of these feelings and thoughts has been cultivated, MBCT directs patients to accept these negative patterns and in theory remove their negative influence.

Occupational therapists can train clients with SAD in MBCT skills. This often takes place in a group setting over a number of weeks. Training focuses on the concept of "decentering," which is the act of taking a present-focused and non-judgmental stance towards thoughts and feelings. By learning how to decenter, an individual with SAD can theoretically distance themselves from the negative thoughts and feelings that may affect occupational performance in areas such as eating healthily, maintaining social relationships and being productive at work.

Through bringing attention to the present and away from their feelings or thought patterns, clients are encouraged to observe their thought processes rather than reacting to them, thus facilitating occupational engagement and allowing them to manage their SAD.

=== Behavioural activation ===
Behavioural activation is considered to be a traditional form of psychotherapy. It is based on activity scheduling and aims to increase the number of positively reinforcing experiences in an individual's life. This method of psychosocial management has shown comparable efficacy with other psychosocial therapies such as cognitive behavioural therapy, as well as with antidepressant medical treatment among mildly to moderately depressed patients. Behavioural activation has the potential to be highly effective when used in occupational therapy, as it focuses on occupying one's time with activities and experiences that are meaningful, positive, and engaging to the client.

As such, clients who have occupational performance issues in productivity, leisure, and self-care, may benefit from such therapy.

=== Problem-solving therapies ===
Problem-solving therapy intervention involves the patient creating a list of problems, identifying possible solutions, choosing the best solutions, creating a plan to implement them, and finally evaluating the outcomes of their plan with respect to the problems they identify. The effectiveness of problem-solving therapies for managing depression, including that linked to SAD, is an area requiring further research, particularly regarding the conditions under which this method of therapy is effective for treating such depression. The Canadian Occupational Performance Measure (COPM) is a widely used instrument that aids clients working with occupational therapists in identifying their occupational needs, setting goals, and assessing change in occupational performance. The use of problem-solving therapy to focus on client choice and empowerment in setting goals and working towards the management of SAD is complementary to the framework supplied under the COPM.

Problem solving therapies can sometimes be utilised by occupational therapists in the psychosocial rehabilitation of their patients.

=== Outdoor therapy ===
Outdoor work has been documented as an effective method of therapy for those who experience mood-related issues caused by SAD during the winter season in Denmark. There is also evidence of horticulture groups causing positive impacts on depressive impacts. Similarly, outdoor walking can provide a "therapeutic effect" to individuals with SAD that is on par with light therapy.

The impact of these activities can be considered a psychosocial method of managing SAD that can be utilised by occupational therapists to develop and maintain healthy occupational performance in patients with SAD.

== Assessment of SAD ==
Occupational therapists play a role in the assessment and ongoing evaluation of clients who have, or are suspected to have, SAD. These assessments are most often a method of determining the aspects of the disorder requiring most immediate attention, and to examine the effectiveness of a chosen treatment on a patient.

There are two commonly used assessments for SAD. The first is the Structured Interview Guide for the Hamilton Rating Scale for Depression –Seasonal Affective Disorder version (SIGH-SAD). This method involves a semi-structured interview that includes 21 non-seasonal depression items and an extra 8-item SAD-specific sub-scale, which allows occupational therapists to determine the specific client's problems and potentially effective management strategies that they can implement. The second assessment method is the Beck Depression Inventory, 2nd edition (BDI-II). This method is generally accepted as being faster to administer. It contains 21 measures of depressive symptom severity, and also captures atypical symptoms that are common in SAD.
