= Anthony Finkelstein =

British software engineer (born 1959)

Professor Sir Anthony Finkelstein CBE FRS FREng
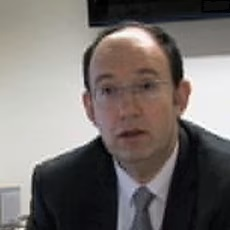
- Born: Anthony Charles Wiener Finkelstein; 28 July 1959 (age 67); London, England
- Education: University of Bradford (BEng); London School of Economics (MSc); Royal College of Art (PhD)
- Known for: Requirements engineering software development processes
- Children: 2
- Awards: CBE FREng FCGI MAE CEng CITP FBCS FIET DSc
- Scientific career
- Fields: Software engineering; Biomedical computing
- Workplaces: Imperial College London University College London Government of the United Kingdom City, University of London
- Thesis: The application of information systems analysis to the activity of the design of complex systems (1985)
- Doctoral advisor: L. Bruce Archer
- Website: finkelstein.uk

Sir Anthony Charles Wiener Finkelstein (born 28 July 1959) is a British engineer and computer scientist. He is the President of City St George's, University of London. He was Chief Scientific Adviser for National Security to the British government until 2021.

== Education and early life ==
Anthony Finkelstein was born on 28 July 1959. He was educated at University College School, the University of Bradford (BEng), the London School of Economics (MSc) and the Royal College of Art (PhD, 1985).

== Career and research ==
Finkelstein's scientific work is in the broad area of software development tools and processes. He has also worked on applications of systems modelling in the life sciences.

He was appointed President of City, University of London in June 2021. He is a member of Council of UK Research and Innovation (UKRI) and Chair of the Police Science Council established by the National Police Chiefs' Council (NPCC).

He was Chief Scientific Adviser for National Security to HM Government from 2015 until 2021. This is a senior role, associated with the Government Office for Science (GOScience) and working across the UK's national security community. During his tenure in post Finkelstein retained a chair in Software Systems Engineering at University College London (UCL) and a Fellowship at the Alan Turing Institute of which he was a Founder Trustee.

Prior to his government role, Finkelstein was the Head of UCL Computer Science and then Dean of the UCL Faculty of Engineering Sciences. He served on the editorial boards of ACM Transactions on Software Engineering and Methodology and IEEE Transactions on Software Engineering. He was appointed in 2013 as a Member of Council of the UK Engineering and Physical Sciences Research Council (EPSRC) by the then Minister for Universities and Science, David Willetts. He was appointed as the UK government's Chief Scientific Adviser for National Security in December 2015.

Finkelstein is a visiting professor at Imperial College London, at the University of South Australia and formerly at the National Institute of Informatics, Tokyo, Japan. He was until 2022 a member of the Scientific Advisory Board of the Singapore National Research Foundation and previously served on the Board of the NHS Royal National Orthopaedic Hospital (RNOH).

== Honours and awards ==
Finkelstein is an elected Fellow of the Royal Academy of Engineering (FREng). He is also an elected Member of Academia Europaea and a Fellow of the City and Guilds of London Institute. He is a Distinguished Fellow of the Royal United Services Institute (RUSI). He is a Fellow of the Institution of Engineering and Technology (IET) and the British Computer Society (BCS). He was elected a Fellow of the Royal Society in 2025.

In 2009 he received the Oliver Lodge Medal of the IET for achievement in Information Technology. In 2013 he received the Outstanding Service Award from the International Federation for Information Processing (IFIP).

Finkelstein was appointed Commander of the Order of the British Empire (CBE) in the 2016 Birthday Honours for services to computer science and engineering and was knighted in the 2022 New Year Honours for public service.

== Personal life ==
His mother, Mirjam Finkelstein, was a Holocaust survivor of the Bergen-Belsen concentration camp, while his father Ludwik Finkelstein OBE was born in Lwów (then in Poland but now in Ukraine), and became Professor of Measurement and Instrumentation at City University London. He is a grandson, via his mother, of Alfred Wiener, the Jewish activist and founder of the Wiener Library. He is a brother of the peer, Daniel Finkelstein and of Tamara Finkelstein, Permanent Secretary at the Department for Environment, Food and Rural Affairs.

He is married and has two sons.
