= Hitler, Stalin, Mum and Dad =

2023 memoir by Daniel Finkelstein

Hitler, Stalin, Mum and Dad: A Family Memoir of Miraculous Survival
- First United Kingdom edition
- Author: Daniel Finkelstein
- Cover artist: Emma Pidsley
- Language: English
- Subject: World War II; The Holocaust
- Genres: Non-fiction; Biography; European history
- Publisher: William Collins
- Publication date: 8 June 2023
- Publication place: United Kingdom
- Media type: print (hardback)
- Pages: 496
- ISBN: 978-0-008483-84-5

Hitler, Stalin, Mum and Dad: A Family Memoir of Miraculous Survival is a memoir by Daniel Finkelstein. It was first published in June 2023 in the United Kingdom by William Collins, and as Two Roads Home: Hitler, Stalin, and the Miraculous Survival of My Family by Doubleday in the United States in September 2023. It is an account of his Jewish parents' persecution during the Second World War, how his mother survived Hitler's death camps and his father endured slave labour and starvation in Stalin's Siberian Gulag.

Finkelstein is a British journalist and politician. He is a political columnist and former executive editor of The Times in London, and was made a member of the House of Lords in August 2013.

Hitler, Stalin, Mum and Dad was the 2023 winner of the British literary magazine, Slightly Foxed's "Best First Biography Prize", a finalist in the 2023 National Jewish Book Awards, and was shortlisted for the 2024 Orwell Prize for Political Writing. The memoir was selected by several publications as one of their best books of 2023, including the Financial Times, The Spectator and The Economist.

== Synopsis ==
Hitler, Stalin, Mum and Dad tells the story of Daniel Finkelstein's family in Europe, before, during and after the Second World War.

Mirjam, Daniel's mother, the youngest daughter of German Jews, Margarete (Grete) and Alfred Wiener, was born in Berlin in 1933. Alfred made it his life's ambition to document the rise of antisemitism in Germany and record Nazi crimes. When Hitler came to power in 1933 and it became clear that Jews were no longer safe in Germany, Alfred relocated his family to Amsterdam in the Netherlands, close to where Anne Frank lived. At the time, the Netherlands was considered a safe haven because of its neutrality. Alfred took his library of accumulated documents to London for safety and was preparing to bring Grete and their three daughters to England, when Germany invaded the Netherlands, cutting Alfred off from his family. In June 1943, Grete and her three daughters, including ten-year-old Mirjam, were detained by the Nazis and sent to the Westerbork transit camp in northeastern Netherlands. From there they were transported to the Bergen-Belsen concentration camp in Germany in January 1944, where they were forced to work as slaves and given very little food.

Ludwik Finkelstein, Daniel's father, was the son of Adolf (Dolu) and Amalia Finkelstein (Lusia), prosperous Polish Jews living in Lwów in eastern Poland (now Lviv in western Ukraine). In August 1939, Hitler and Stalin signed a non-aggression pact in which they agreed to divide Poland between them, and in September 1939, Germany invaded west Poland and the Soviet Union east Poland. Overnight, the Finkelsteins became Soviet citizens, but were soon detained on suspicion of being anti-Soviet. Dolu was deported to a Siberian Gulag slave labour camp in Ukhta near the Arctic Circle, while Lusia and ten-year-old Ludwik were sent to a forced labour collective farm in Kazakhstan. The Finkelsteins had to constantly fight freezing temperatures and starvation to stay alive.

In June 1941, Hitler launched an offensive against Stalin which resulted in the release of Dolu, Lusia and Ludwik from the Soviets. Dolu, now recruited with many other released Poles to fight the advancing Germans, reunited with Lusia and Ludwik in Yangiyoʻl in Uzbekistan in March 1942. The Finkelsteins made their slow way out of the Soviet Union to Tehran in Iran in August 1942, and then on to London in August 1947.

In London in 1944, Alfred managed to secure fake Paraguayan passports for Grete and their daughters, and in January 1945, they were released from Bergen-Belsen as part of a prisoner exchange with the Germans. Grete died later that month, but Mirjam and her sisters travelled to Switzerland and then on to New York City in February 1945. They joined Alfred later in London in January 1947. Mirjam met Ludwik in April 1956 and they married in July 1957.

Daniel Finkelstein, the second of three children, was born to Mirjam and Ludwik in London in August 1962. Daniel's paternal grandparents, Dolu and Lusia died in June 1950 and February 1980 respectively, while his maternal grandfather, Alfred died in February 1964. Daniel's parents, Mirjam and Ludwik died in January 2017 and August 2011 respectively. British intelligence made extensive use of Alfred's library during the war, and it was used as evidence during the Nuremberg trials in 1945–1946. After the war, his library was formally established as the Wiener Holocaust Library in London, and became one of the world's foremost Holocaust research institutes.

"In the battle with Hitler and Stalin, the victory belongs to Mum and Dad."

— Daniel Finkelstein, Hitler, Stalin, Mum and Dad.

== Reception ==
In a review in The Guardian, Rohan Silva called Hitler, Stalin, Mum and Dad a "powerful and beautifully written … book". He said Finkelstein explores themes that lift the memoir "to the status of a modern classic", alongside Philippe Sands's East West Street and Edmund de Waal's The Hare with Amber Eyes. Silva stated that one such theme is "the futility of intellectual reasoning in the face of rabid irrationality." He noted that despite Alfred Wiener's dedication to "expos[ing] the contradictions of antisemite[ism]", the Nazis still took over the country. Another theme in the book is despair. Even though Finkelstein's parents survived, Sliva remarked that "there’s an overwhelming sense of what has been lost: so many families, so many happy homes, so many childhoods."

Writing in The Daily Telegraph, Angus Reilly described Hitler, Stalin, Mum and Dad as a "superb memoir". He said "powered by a sense of filial duty", Finkelstein has produced "an exciting story of courage and persistence" that is "engagingly sustained" from start to finish. Reilly opined that just as Philippe Sands and Jonathan Freedland have returned to the Holocaust to write books "full of emotive colour", Finkelstein has done the same, delivering "an elegy for the past, and a hopeful call for the future." Reilly gave the book a rating of five stars out of five.

Ian Hughes called Hitler, Stalin, Mum and Dad a "heartbreaking family testimony" that is "deeply moving". In a review in The Irish Times Hughes said he found parts of the book almost "unbearable to read", including the accounts of how most of the children who played together in the streets of Amsterdam in the early 1940s ended up being killed in Nazi death camps. Hughes stated that Finkelstein's "remarkable book" is "an extraordinary testimony to love and hate", and "is essential reading for our troubled present".

In a review of Two Roads Home (the United States edition of the book) in The Wall Street Journal, Tunku Varadarajan stated that Finkelstein's story is "so overflowing with cruelty and loss that [his] prose needs only to be spare and plain for us to be scorched by his narrative". Varadarajan wrote that Finkelstein "is firm in his own conviction that [Hitler and Stalin] were peers in the annals of evil", and added that it came as "no greater blessing" to the author that by surviving, his mother and father had beaten both dictators.

Diane Cole called the memoir "an indelible chronicle of both historical and personal significance." Reviewing Two Roads Home in The Washington Post, Cole said it "tracks each family member’s physical passage through the inferno alongside the soul-scarring cycles of doubt and despair". She found that she had to stop reading from time to time to process "the cruelties so routinely perpetrated by both Hitler’s and Stalin’s forces", but stated that it was Finkelstein's "adroit depiction[s]" of the book's characters and their resilience that kept her reading this "unflinching and gripping family history".

== Works cited ==
- Finkelstein, Daniel (2023). Hitler, Stalin, Mum and Dad: A Family Memoir of Miraculous Survival. William Collins. ISBN 978-0-008483-84-5.
