= Ernst Fraenkel (businessman) =

British businesspeople (1923 - 2014)

- Born: 1923
- Died: 13 November 2014 (aged 90–91)
- Occupation: businesspeople

Ernst Fraenkel, OBE, (1923 – 13 November 2014) was a British businessman who was chairman and joint president of the Wiener Library for the Study of the Holocaust and Genocide (1990–2003).
