= GenScript Biotech =

Biotechnology group

GenScript Biotech Corporation
- Type: Public
- Traded as: SEHK: 1548
- Industry: Life sciences; Biopharmaceutical; Biotechnology; Industrial enzymes
- Founded: 2002; 24 years ago in New Jersey, United States
- Founders: Frank Zhang; Sally Wang; Larry Wang
- Headquarters: Nanjing
- Key people: Sherry Shao, (rotating CEO)
- Revenue: $959.5 million (2025)
- Number of employees: 6,165 (2025)
- Subsidiaries: GenScript Life Science Group; ProBio; Bestzyme
- Website: www.genscript.com

GenScript Biotech, fully known as GenScript Biotech Corporation, usually referred to as simply GenScript, is a Chinese biotech company. It was co-founded in 2002 in New Jersey by Fangliang Zhang, Ye Wang, and Luquan Wang. Headquartered in Nanjing, the company provides equipment and services for the life sciences. It was listed on the Hong Kong Stock Exchange in 2015. The current rotating CEO of the firm is Sherry Shao, who previously served as the chief operating officer and Chinese Communist Party Committee Secretary for the company. The company's subsidiaries include GenScript Life Science Group, ProBio Technology, and Bestzyme.

== History ==
GenScript Biotech Corporation was founded in 2002 in New Jersey by Fangliang "Frank" Zhang, Ye "Sally" Wang, and Luquan "Larry" Wang. In 2004, it set up a research and production base in Nanjing, China, where it is now headquartered. It operates in the United States, China, and Singapore.

In 2013, it established its subsidiary Bestzyme. In the following year, another subsidiary, Legend Biotech, was founded. In 2015, GenScript went public on the Hong Kong Stock Exchange.

In 2017, the Chinese government accepted Nanjing Legend's application for running clinical trials for its blood cancer treatment.

In 2020, its subsidiary Probio was launched and Legend Biotech was listed on the NASDAQ. In the same year, Genscript collaborated with Duke-NUS Medical School to develop and manufacture a serology test called cPass for the detection of COVID-19. On November 6, the cPass test received emergency use authorization from the US FDA.

In 2022, Carvykti, a CAR-T cell therapy developed by Janssen Biotech and Legend Biotech, was approved by the US FDA for the treatment of multiple myeloma in adult patients.

== Security concerns ==
In May 2024, the United States House Select Committee on Strategic Competition between the United States and the Chinese Communist Party asked the Federal Bureau of Investigation (FBI) and Director of National Intelligence for a briefing on whether the Chinese government has any undue influence over GenScript and three of its subsidiaries (Bestzyme, Legend Biotech, and ProBio).
