= Tamara Finkelstein =

British civil servant (born 1967)

Dame Tamara Finkelstein DCB
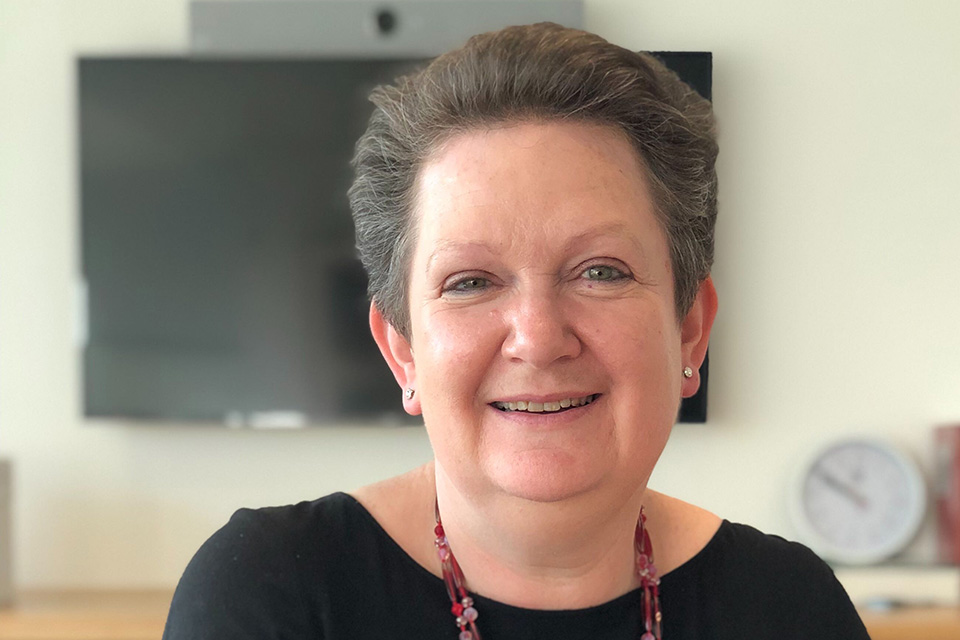

Permanent Secretary for the Department for Environment, Food and Rural Affairs
- In office 19 June 2019 – 30 June 2025
- Prime Minister: Theresa May; Boris Johnson; Liz Truss; Rishi Sunak; Keir Starmer
- Minister: Michael Gove; Theresa Villiers; George Eustice; Ranil Jayawardena; Thérèse Coffey; Steve Barclay; Steve Reed
- Preceded by: Clare Moriarty
- Succeeded by: David Hill (interim)

Personal details
- Born: 24 May 1967 (age 59)
- Parent(s): Ludwik Finkelstein (father); Mirjam Finkelstein (mother)
- Relatives: Daniel Finkelstein (brother); Anthony Finkelstein (brother); Alfred Wiener (grandfather)
- Education: Haberdashers' Aske's School for Girls
- Alma mater: Balliol College, Oxford; London School of Economics
- Occupation: Civil servant

Dame Tamara Margaret Finkelstein (born 24 May 1967) is a British former civil servant who, since February 2026, has been the CEO of the Royal Academy of Engineering. She was formerly the permanent secretary at the Department for Environment, Food and Rural Affairs.

== Early life and education ==
Tamara Margaret Finkelstein was born on 24 May 1967 to the academic Ludwik Finkelstein and the Holocaust survivor and educator Mirjam Finkelstein. She has two brothers, Daniel Finkelstein, a journalist and a politician, and Anthony Finkelstein, a software engineer and civil servant. Her grandfather was Alfred Wiener.

She was educated at Haberdashers' Aske's School for Girls before studying engineering science at Balliol College, Oxford, graduating in 1989, and economics at the London School of Economics, graduating in 1992.

== Career ==
Finkelstein joined HM Treasury in 1992 as an economic adviser. She became private secretary and speechwriter to the Chancellor of the Exchequer in 1997 and a senior adviser in 2000. She was deputy director for Sure Start from 2001 to 2004 before holding a number of director roles.

After 22 years at the Treasury, she joined the Department of Health in 2014 as the Chief Operating Officer and a director-general. In the aftermath of the Grenfell Tower fire, she led the establishment of the building safety programme at the Department of Communities and Local Government. In 2018, she joined the Department for Environment, Food and Rural Affairs as director-general for EU Exit Delivery, and succeeded Clare Moriarty as the permanent secretary in 2019.

Finkelstein has been a trustee for the charity Norwood since 2018.

In 2024, Finkelstein was one of four appointable candidates shortlisted by an expert panel to be Cabinet Secretary. Prime Minister Keir Starmer chose Chris Wormald for the position.

== Honours ==
Finkelstein was appointed a Companion of the Order of the Bath (CB) in the 2020 New Year Honours and promoted to a Dame Commander of the same Order (DCB) in the 2025 New Year Honours, both for public service.

Government offices
Preceded by Clare Moriarty	Permanent Secretary of the Department for Environment, Food and Rural Affairs; 2019–2025	Succeeded by David Hill (interim)
