= Su-Chun Zhang =

American stem cell researcher

- Born: 1963 (age 62–63); Wenling, Zhejiang, China
- Education: Wenzhou Medical College (MD)
- Known for: Research on stem cell
- Scientific career
- Fields: Stem cellresearch, Neuroscience
- Workplaces: Sanford Burnham Prebys Medical Discovery Institute

Su-Chun Zhang (born 1963 in Wenling, Zhejiang) is an American stem cell researcher at the Sanford Burnham Prebys Medical Discovery Institute, where he has served since November 2024. He previously held positions at Duke-NUS Medical School in Singapore and the University of Wisconsin–Madison.

== Biography ==
Zhang obtained MD from the Wenzhou Medical College, Wenzhou, and PhD from the University of Saskatchewan, Canada.

Zhang was Professor of Anatomy and Neurology (now Neuroscience) and a research group leader at the University of Wisconsin–Madison.

In January 2005, Zhang's group differentiated human blastocyst stem cells into neural stem cells, then further into the starts of motor neurons, and eventually into spinal motor neuron cells (which play important role in delivering information from the brain to the spinal cord in the human body). The artificially generated motor neurons exhibited profiles the same as those normal natural ones, including functions like electrophysiological activity which is the signature of neurons. Zhang described this study, "... you need to teach the blastocyst stem cells to change step by step, where each step has different conditions and a strict window of time". The research was described as having potential applications for studying diseases and injuries affecting spinal cord and motor neurons. Zhang's next step focused on the communicational ability of these newly generated neurons when they are transplanted into a living vertebrate.

== See also ==
- Stem cell treatments
- Neural stem cells: development and transplantation: Chapter 10 - Neuronal Replacement by Transplantation (by Daniel J. Guillaume and Su-Chun Zhang)
- Generating motor neurons
