= Karfunkel =

Karfunkel is a surname. Notable people with the surname include:

- Aaron Karfunkel (died 1816), Bohemian rabbi
- George Karfunkel (born 1948/49), American businessman

== See also ==
- Garfunkel
