= Mirjam Finkelstein =

German Holocaust survivor and educator (1933–2017)

Mirjam Finkelstein (née Wiener; 10 June 1933 – 28 January 2017) was a Holocaust survivor and educator. Born in Berlin, Germany, to Alfred Wiener, a Jewish activist and founder of the Wiener Library for the Study of the Holocaust and Genocide, she moved with her family to Amsterdam in 1933. There, she grew up in the same community as Anne Frank and they knew each other as children.

In June 1943, Finkelstein was taken by the Nazis along with her mother and sisters to Westerbork transit camp and then to Bergen-Belsen concentration camp. She was one of the eye witnesses to the presence in Bergen-Belsen of Anne Frank and her sister, Margot. When she saw them arrive at the camp, her sister Ruth took out a forbidden pocket diary and wrote a note about their arrival, which later became important evidence of Anne Frank's whereabouts after the war. Mirjam's father, who had managed to reach London in 1939, was able to obtain fake Paraguayan passports for his family, but the visas arrived after the German invasion of the Netherlands in May 1940. The other members of the family were included as part of a prisoner exchange at the Swiss border in January 1945. German soldiers still boarded the train to take them to another camp. With her two sisters, Ruth and Eva, Mirjam Wiener successfully pressed them to allow their safe passage on the train from Bergen-Belsen because their mother was too ill to move. Other ill prisoners were removed instead. Margarethe, her mother, died from starvation after her arrival in Switzerland.

Finkelstein settled in London, spending the rest of her life on behalf of the Anne Frank Foundation and the Holocaust Educational Trust, visiting schools to talk about her experiences during the Holocaust. In 2016, she was photographed for the book Survivor.

She married Ludwik Finkelstein. The couple had three children: Daniel Finkelstein, Anthony Finkelstein and Tamara Finkelstein.

== See also ==
- Hitler, Stalin, Mum and Dad, a 2023 memoir by Daniel Finkelstein
