= Duke-NUS Medical School =

Graduate medical school in Singapore

Coordinates: 1.28117°N 103.83416°E

- 杜克－新加坡国立大学医学院 (Chinese)
- Former name: Duke-NUS Graduate Medical School
- Type: Medical school
- Established: April 2005; 21 years ago
- Parent institution: Duke University and National University of Singapore
- Dean: Tan Boon Ooi Patrick
- Location: Singapore
- Website: duke-nus.edu.sg duke.nus.edu

The Duke-NUS Medical School (Duke-NUS) is a graduate medical school in Singapore. Established in April 2005 as the Duke-NUS Graduate Medical School, it is Singapore's second medical school, after NUS Yong Loo Lin School of Medicine and before NTU Lee Kong Chian School of Medicine.

The school is a collaboration between Duke University in the United States and the National University of Singapore in Singapore. Duke-NUS follows the American model of post-baccalaureate medical education, in which students begin their medical studies after earning a bachelor's degree. Students are awarded degrees from both Duke University and the National University of Singapore.

== Outram campus ==
The construction of Duke-NUS Medical School's primary facility, the Khoo Teck Puat Building, started in December 2006. In May 2009, the School shifted from its first campus at Jalan Bukit Merah into the Outram campus of Singapore General Hospital, next to the College of Medicine Building. The 13-storey green-certified building was officially inaugurated by then- Prime Minister of Singapore Lee Hsien Loong on 28 September 2009.

On 30 November 2010, the strategic collaboration between Duke and NUS was extended by a further five years. On 2 June 2016, the stakeholders extended this through another five-year agreement. During this third phase of the partnership, SingHealth came onboard as Duke-NUS' academic medicine partner. Together, Duke-NUS and SingHealth transformed the campus at Outram into SingHealth Duke-NUS Academic Medical Centre.

On 13 October 2022, the fourth phase of the Duke-NUS collaboration agreement was signed by the presidents of Duke-NUS Medical School's two parent universities at a ceremony held in Durham, North Carolina, extending the partnership for another five years.

== Graduate programmes ==
Below are graduate programmes that are offered at Duke-NUS Medical School.

=== Doctor of Medicine programme ===
Duke-NUS' Doctor of Medicine (MD) programme is a four-year programme based on the Duke University School of Medicine curriculum. Students who successfully complete the course of study and fulfill all requirements are awarded a joint MD degree from Duke University and the National University of Singapore.

The Duke-NUS curriculum is similar to that of the Duke University School of Medicine, consisting of four years: the first year is for pre-clerkship, the second year for clerkship, the third year for research, and the fourth year for advanced clinical rotations. Duke-NUS employs an extensive team-based learning method called TeamLEAD (Learn, Engage, Apply, Develop). Students prepare for classes with pre-reading materials and recorded lectures. They begin the class with a test, and then proceed to discuss the test questions and other open-ended questions in a small group setting. The faculty act as facilitators for student discussions, moving away from traditional pedagogical teaching.

Prospective students are required to take the Medical College Admission Test (MCAT) or the Graduate Medical School Admissions Test (GMAT). Applicants are also evaluated based on their academic performance, research experience, and evidence of leadership capabilities.

=== PhD programme ===
Duke-NUS offers a Doctor of Philosophy (PhD) programmes in Integrated Biology and Medicine, Clinical and Translational Sciences, as well as Quantitative Biology and Medicine. Graduates from the IBM track are conferred PhD degrees jointly award by Duke University and the National University of Singapore, while graduates from the other two tracks receive their PhD degrees from the National University of Singapore.

=== MD-PhD programme ===
Duke-NUS also offers an MD-PhD programme, where students complete the following: one year of basic science coursework, one year of clinical rotations, four years of research work in Singapore or the United States, and a final year of clinical rotations.

== Signature research programmes ==
Signature research programmes at Duke-NUS focus on the following areas.

- Cancer and Stem Cell Biology
- Cardiovascular and Metabolic Disorders
- Emerging Infectious Diseases
- Health Services and Systems Research
- Neuroscience and Behavioral Disorders

== Research centres ==
Duke-NUS hosts several research and medical centres.

- Centre for Aging Research and Education
- Centre for Computational Biology
- Centre for Outbreak Preparedness
- Centre for Quantitative Medicine
- Centre of Regulatory Excellence
- Centre for Technology and Development
- Lien Centre for Palliative Care
- Centre for Clinician-Scientist+ Development
- Centre for Vision Research
- Pre-hospital & Emergency Research Centre

=== Singhealth Duke-NUS Academic Medical Centre ===
The SingHealth Duke-NUS Academic Medical Centre (AMC) was established by SingHealth and Duke-NUS. Through this partnership in academic medicine, the AMC harnesses the collective strengths of Duke-NUS' medical education and research capabilities, and SingHealth's clinical expertise to bring about improved healthcare and patient outcomes.

Some of the centres launched under this partnership include:

- SingHealth Duke-NUS Surgical Skills and Simulation Centre (SSSC)
- SingHealth Duke-NUS Global Health Institute
- SingHealth Duke-NUS Maternal and Child Health Research
- SingHealth Duke-NUS Transplant Centre

== Academic clinical programmes ==
Graduates are awarded degrees from both Duke University and the National University of Singapore.

Academic clinical programmes were created for 15 clinical specialties, harnessing the expertise of each discipline across SingHealth and Duke-NUS for cooperation in clinical care, education and research.

- Anaesthesiology and perioperative sciences
- Cardiovascular sciences
- Emergency medicine
- Family medicine
- Medicine
- Musculoskeletal sciences
- Neuroscience
- Obstetrics and gynaecology
- Oncology
- Ophthalmology and visual sciences
- Oral health
- Paediatrics
- Pathology
- Radiological sciences
- Surgery

== COVID-19 research ==
cPass

cPass is a COVID-19 test kit that Duke-NUS co-developed with biotech company GenScript Biotech Corporation and the Agency for Science, Technology and Research's (A*Star) Diagnostics Development Hub (DxD Hub), capable of checking for signs of a COVID-19 infection in individuals within an hour.

Developed by a team led by Professor Wang Linfa, from Duke-NUS' Emerging Infectious Diseases programme, the kit was also the first of its kind to receive emergency authorisation from the United States Food and Drug Administration (FDA).

A precursor of the test was also used to detect Singapore's largest coronavirus infection cluster at the Grace Assembly of God Church.

Made-in-Singapore Swab Robot

Known as SwabBot, the robot developed by Rena Dharmawan and her team carries out nasal swabbing, helping to address the limitations of manual COVID-19 swabbing as well as to standardise the consistency of swabs taken.

COVID-19 saliva Amplified Antigen Rapid Test

Co-developed by SingHealth Duke-NUS Academic Medical Centre and the National University of Singapore researchers, this saliva-based COVID-19 Antigen Rapid Test (ART) technology uses a proprietary on-kit amplification technique, enabling detection of the SARS-CoV-2 virus with sensitivity close to that of laboratory-based polymerase chain reaction (PCR) tests, in 15 minutes.

COVID-19 stories book and microsite

To chronicle the School's research and innovations made in the fight against COVID-19, Duke-NUS launched a book titled Duke-NUS COVID Stories, along with a microsite.

== Administration ==
Senior management at Duke-NUS Medical School includes the following.

- Tan Boon Ooi Patrick (Dean)
- Karen Chang (Senior Vice-Dean & Group Director, Office of Corporate Services)
- Lok Sheemei (Interim Vice-Dean, Office of Research)
- Shiva Sarraf-Yazdi (Vice-Dean, Office of Education)
- Lim Soon Thye (Vice-Dean, Office of Academic Medicine)
- Silke Vogel (Vice-Dean, Office of Faculty Affairs)
- Christopher Laing (Vice-Dean, Office of Innovation & Entrepreneurship)

== Notable faculty ==
- Eric Finkelstein
- Augustus John Rush
- Su-Chun Zhang
- Yvonne Chuan Fang Su
- R. Sanders Williams
