= Carbuncle (gemstone) =

Red gemstone

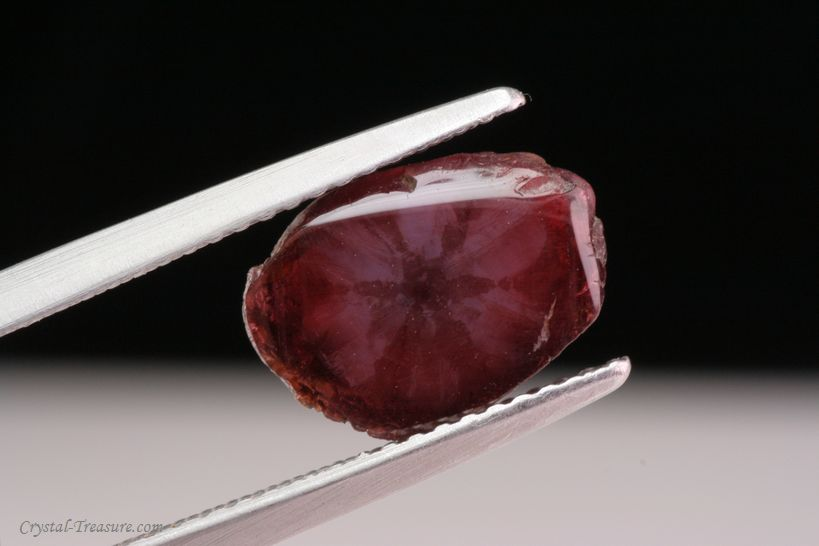
A polished almandine stone (garnet)

Carbuncle (/ˈkɑːrbʌŋkəl/) is another name for a deep red almandine gemstone that has been cut with a smooth, convex face in a method called cabochon. Traditionally, the term referred to any red gemstone, most often a red garnet.

Carbuncles and their chimeras have spanned three millennia. Intermingling red gems until the time of their crystal-chemical definitions at the end of the 18th century, they united, for commercial purposes, the various sardonyx and carnelian, garnets, ruby and spinel as an intrinsic common quality of their luminous dispersion magnified by artifacts.

== Cultural references ==
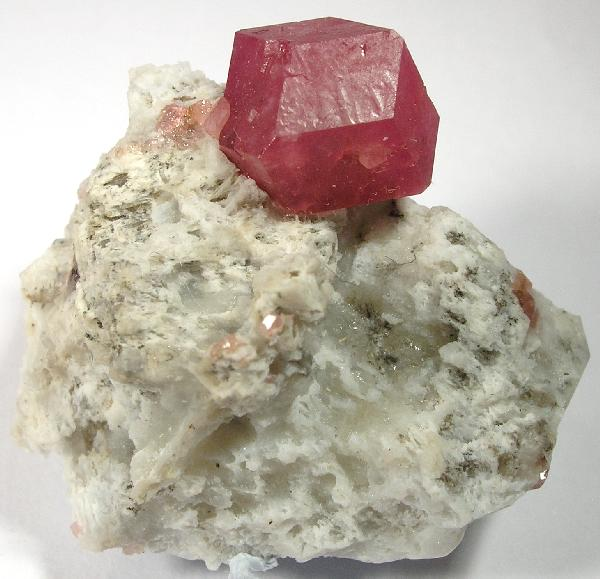
Red garnet

=== Legendary creature ===
In South American folklore, the carbuncle is a small elusive animal containing a mirror, shining gemstone or riches like gold. The description of the carbuncle varies, some saying it looks like a firefly in the night, or like having a bivalve-like shell and maize ear shape. According to the Book of Imaginary Beings "nobody ever saw it well enough to know whether it was a bird or a mammal, whether it had feathers or fur." A Chilean man known as Gaspar Huerta is said to have encountered a carbuncle while digging an irrigation canal, but reportedly he could not see what its shape was because he killed it on the spot to recover its riches. In Chilote mythology it is variously described as a green-red shining animal such as a dog, cat, bivalve or simply a flame that is the "guardian of the metals".

=== Medieval texts ===
In fiction, a carbuncle can also be a stone with magical properties, usually capable of providing its own illumination to an otherwise dark interior. This is encountered in a number of medieval texts. In the French romance of c. 1150, Le Pèlerinage de Charlemagne à Jérusalem et à Constantinople, a fictionalized Charlemagne finds that his bedchamber in Emperor Hugo's palace at Constantinople has such lighting. An English translation from the Welsh version of c. 1200 says, "Within it was a golden column, and for light a carbuncle stone in its end, making it always day, when the day was gone." In the initial letter ostensibly written by the mythical Prester John and sent to European heads of state in 1165, the priest-king claims that carbuncles regularly serve as indoor lighting: "Indeed at either end of the palace, above the roof-ridge, are two golden apples, and in each of these are two carbuncles, so that the gold shines in the day and the carbuncles sparkle at night." In another of Prester John's architectural wonders there is "a carbuncle of such size as a large amphora, by which the palace is illuminated as the world is illuminated by the sun". The divinely illuminated stones in the Book of Mormon, Ether 6:2–3, match this description.

=== The Bible ===
Several passages in the Bible refer to gemstones, which are variously translated into English; some translations (such as the Jewish Publication Society of America Version given here) use "carbuncle" in the following passages:

- Exodus 28:18 and 39:11 both refer to the carbuncles (Biblical Hebrew: נֹ֥פֶךְ, romanized: nōp̄eḵ) use as the fourth stone in the breastplate of the Hoshen.
- Ezekiel 28:13 is a lamentation on the king of Tyrus, speaking of the fall of Satan "... every precious stone was thy covering, the carnelian, topaz, and the diamond, ..., the carbuncle [נֹ֥פֶךְ, nōp̄eḵ], and gold".
- Isaiah 54:12 uses 'carbuncle' (Hebrew: אֶקְדָּ֑ח, romanized: ’eqdāḥ) to convey the value of the Lord's blessing [and promise] to His barren woman servant: (Isaiah 54:1) "Sing, O barren, thou that didst not bear, break forth into singing, and cry aloud, thou that didst not travail; [... v.5] For thy Maker is thine husband; [... v.12] And I will make thy pinnacles of rubies, and thy gates of carbuncles, and all thy border of precious stones."

=== Additional references ===
- Bede says, "Carbuncle, of a red colour, which the eyes love; from a distance it emits splendour, which close up is not seen."
- The eponymous gem in the Sherlock Holmes tale "The Adventure of the Blue Carbuncle" is referred to as a carbuncle (although, being blue, it is technically not a carbuncle). The author, Arthur Conan Doyle, also wrote a short story involving the gem, "The Stone of Boxman's Drift". In the Sherlock Holmes novel The Sign of Four, the contents of a stolen treasure chest were inventoried by the gang of thieves. The list included "forty carbuncles."
- A carbuncle plays a mystic role in Nathaniel Hawthorne's story "The Great Carbuncle".
- Hamlet by William Shakespeare refers to carbuncles in act 2 scene 2 line 401: "With eyes like carbuncles, the hellish Pyrrhus ..."
- In John Milton's Paradise Lost, Book 9, Satan's eyes are like carbuncles (line 500), an image Milton may have borrowed from the Roman de la Rose.
- A carbuncle is one of the last items listed in Sir Thomas Browne's catalogue of lost, rumoured and imaginary books, pictures and objects Musaeum Clausum (circa 1675).
- Carbuncle is a recurring creature in ongoing video game series Final Fantasy since Final Fantasy V in 1992. While its design ranges from a small, cute mammal to a large terrifying reptile, it always has a red gemstone on its forehead.
- In Anne Rice's novel The Witching Hour, Richard Llewellyn shows Aaron Lightner of The Talamasca a "beautiful carbuncle ring".
- In the third book in Barbara Sleigh's Carbonel series, Carbonel and Calidor, one of the characters, John, is attempting to cast a spell for which he requires a rhyme with "uncle" and hits upon "carbuncle".
- Via German Karfunkel and thence Yiddish Gorfinkl גאָרפֿינקל, the gemstone's name is the origin of the Jewish surname Garfunkel.
- In C.S. Lewis’ novel “The Horse and His Boy”, Prince Ahosta mentions how “sons are in the eyes of their fathers more precious than carbuncles.”
- In the Madō Monogatari and Puyo Puyo franchises, series protagonist Arle Nadja has a pet named Carbuncle. Carbuncle's head has a gem in it that is approximately the same color as carbuncle.
- In the anime series Yu-Gi-Oh! GX, Jesse Anderson uses a card named "Crystal Beast Ruby Carbuncle", which is a real printed card in the cardgame Yu-Gi-Oh!.
- In Terry Pratchett's novel Mort the city of Ankh-Morpork is represented by a carbuncle on the representation of the Discworld within Death's study. This is not a reference to the gemstone though...
