= R. Sanders Williams =

Robert Sanders "Sandy" Williams is the former President of the Gladstone Institutes in San Francisco, as well as Professor of Medicine at the University of California, San Francisco, with which Gladstone is affiliated. Prior to joining Gladstone, he was the Dean of the Duke University School of Medicine from 2001 to 2007.

== Education ==
Williams was born in Athens, Georgia in 1948, and attended Princeton University, graduating in 1970. He then earned an M.D. from Duke University's Medical School in 1974, later completing a residency in internal medicine at Massachusetts General Hospital and a cardiology fellowship at Duke. While at Duke University, his laboratory discovered key genes, proteins and pathways involved in the development and proliferation of cardiac and skeletal muscle cells (or myocytes)—giving researchers insight into early heart development.

== Career ==
Williams served as a professor of medicine at Duke from 1980 to 1990 and later took a professorship at the University of Texas Southwestern Medical Center, where he directed cardiovascular research and medicine.

Williams was founding Dean of the Duke-NUS Graduate Medical School of Singapore and lead negotiator for major Duke programs in China and elsewhere. In 1987 he was elected to the American Society for Clinical Investigation, and in 2002 he was elected to the Institute of Medicine of the National Academies. He is also a member of the Association of American Physicians and a fellow of the American Association for the Advancement of Science.

In addition to his work in academia, Williams is an Independent Director of the Laboratory Corporation of America. Williams was named as senior advisor for International Strategy.
