= Beatrice Finkelstein =

American space nutritionist

Beatrice Finkelstein was the chief nutritionist at the Food Technology Section of the Life Support Systems Laboratory at Wright-Patterson Air Force Base. Her work helped feed astronauts before and during the first space flights.

== Career ==
Finkelstein's main contributions to nutrition in spaceflight stem from her work developing pre-flight feeding for astronauts on Project Mercury. On July 21, 1960, Finkelstein submitted a meal plan for the 72 to 96 hours before flight. Her plan consisted of high-protein, low-residue meals for the astronauts in preparation for flight. During Project Mercury, the astronauts could not safely remove their protective clothing to perform this physiological function, so this diet was crucial. Additionally, in the weeks before each Project Mercury launch, Finkelstein would manage the astronauts' diet at a specialized facility behind NASA Hangar S in Cape Canaveral, Florida.

She also published research on nutrition in space, including an article in The American Journal of Clinical Nutrition in 1960 that analyzed the challenges of providing sustenance for astronauts in space. Many of the solutions from this publication are used in space travel today, such as dehydrated food and "squeeze" tubes.

== Legacy ==
Many aspects of Finkelstein’s menus for astronauts have endured through the modern age. For example, it is now a tradition for astronauts to be served steak and eggs before flight. This meal choice was first served to Alan Shepard on May 5, 1961, before his launch in Freedom 7. Finkelstein designed this menu to be low-fiber and low-residue to reduce bowel movements during flight.
