= Hans Finkelstein =

German chemist (1885–1938)

- Born: 17 May 1885; Leipzig, Germany
- Died: December 1938 (aged 53)
- Citizenship: German
- Known for: Finkelstein reaction
- Spouse: Annemarie Bruns (m. 1912)
- Children: Three
- Scientific career
- Fields: Chemistry

Hans Finkelstein (17 May 1885, Leipzig, Germany - December 1938) was a German chemist. He is particularly known for the Finkelstein reaction developed by and named after him.

== Biography ==
Hans Finkelstein came from a liberal Jewish family and joined the Protestant Church when he was 10 years old. He studied chemistry like his father Berthold Finkelstein, one of BASF's first chemists.

After studying in Leipzig and Dresden he worked on his doctoral thesis with Johannes Thiele in Strasbourg from 1906, submitting it in 1909. Finkelstein continued his scientific work as assistant to Prof. Thiele until 1912. During this time he also translated scientific books into German with his father.

In 1912 Finkelstein transitioned from university to industry as head of the research department at Bayer AG, Uerdingen. He filed some patents over the years. In 1912, Finkelstein married Annemarie Bruns. Together they had three children.

In November 1938 shortly after the Kristallnacht and the subsequent Decree on the Exclusion of Jews from German Economic Life, Finkelstein was forced to resign from his position in the company and to surrender his passport due to his Jewish descent. In December 1938 he did not see a future for himself and took his own life.

== Work ==
Hans Finkelstein is well known in synthetic organic chemistry for the Finkelstein reaction, developed by him during his doctoral studies and published as a paper in 1910. The reaction describes the substitution of one type of halogen present in a halocarbon by another type of halogen. This process has been employed successfully in particular for the formation of organoiodine compounds among others.
