= Augustus John Rush =

American psychiatrist (born 1942)

A. John Rush
- Born: Augustus John Rush; December 15, 1942 (age 83); New Jersey, U.S.
- Education: Princeton University, Columbia University College of Physicians and Surgeons, Hospital of the University of Pennsylvania
- Scientific career
- Fields: Psychiatrist
- Workplaces: University of Texas Southwestern Medical Center, Duke-NUS Medical School

Augustus John Rush (born December 15, 1942) is a psychiatrist who is a professor emeritus in Duke-NUS Medical School at the National University of Singapore (NUS). He was adjunct professor of psychiatry, Duke School of Medicine from 2009-2023, and as Adjunct Clinical Professor of Psychiatry at Texas Tech University from 2016-2021.
