= Eric Finkelstein =

American economist

Eric Andrew Finkelstein
- Born: March 26, 1970 (age 56)
- Education: University of Michigan, University of Washington
- Scientific career
- Fields: Health economics
- Workplaces: Duke-NUS Medical School
- Thesis: Antitrust issues in hospital markets (1998)

Eric Andrew Finkelstein is an American health economist. He is a professor in the Health Services & Systems Research Program at Duke-NUS Medical School, where he is also the executive director of the Lien Centre for Palliative Care. He is also a research professor at Duke University's Global Health Institute.

== Education ==
Finkelstein received his B.A. from the University of Michigan in 1991 and his M.A., Ph.D., and M.H.A. from the University of Washington in 1996, 1998, and 1999, respectively.

== Academic career ==
In 1999, Finkelstein joined RTI International as a senior health economist, and became the director of the Public Health Economics Program there in 2006. He served as an associate professor at Duke-NUS from 2009 until he was appointed a full professor there in 2013.

== Research ==
Finkelstein is known for his studies examining the economic costs of obesity. One study led by Finkelstein estimated that 42% of Americans would have obesity by 2030.

== Books ==
Finkelstein is the author of two books: "Incidence and Economic Burden of Injuries in the United States" (2006) and "The Fattening of America" (2008).
