= Ben-Ami Finkelstein =

Psychiatrist (1910–1975)

Ben-Ami Finkelstein (28 May 1910 – 3 January 1975) was a psychiatrist.

== Life ==
Finkelstein received his doctorate in 1935 at the University of Zurich with a thesis on the white spot disease. During the Second World War he was interned for a time in a labor camp. He then worked in the psychiatric hospital Tarpeh, where he did research on the ″impact of immigration on the character of mad-prone persons″ (Einfluss der Einwanderung auf den Charakter einer zum Wahnsinn neigenden Person) on the basis of a Holocaust survivor from Lithuania. In 1952 he published his results on that matter that were criticized in 2012 by Israeli historian Rakefet Zalashik for ideological omissions.

Finkelstein has worked at the Eastern State Hospital in Lexington (Kentucky) and at the controversial Lima State Hospital in Lima, Ohio. In the 1970s, Finkelstein worked at the Rosegg hospital in the Swiss township of Solothurn.

In 1957 Finkelstein published through the Amsterdam publisher F. Van Rossen the book ″Psychological sketches″ (Psychologische Skizzen), after which he published numerous articles in American journals, including the Journal of the American Medical Association (in 1971 Finkelstein published, among other articles, one on the suicide of Vincent van Gogh).

Finkelstein, among other things, dealt with the psychology of crime. He was in contact with Albert Einstein and Hans Martin Sutermeister.
