= Finkelstein reaction =

Chemistry

Named after	Hans Finkelstein
Reaction type	Substitution reaction

Identifiers
Organic Chemistry Portal	finkelstein-reaction
RSC ontology ID	RXNO:0000155

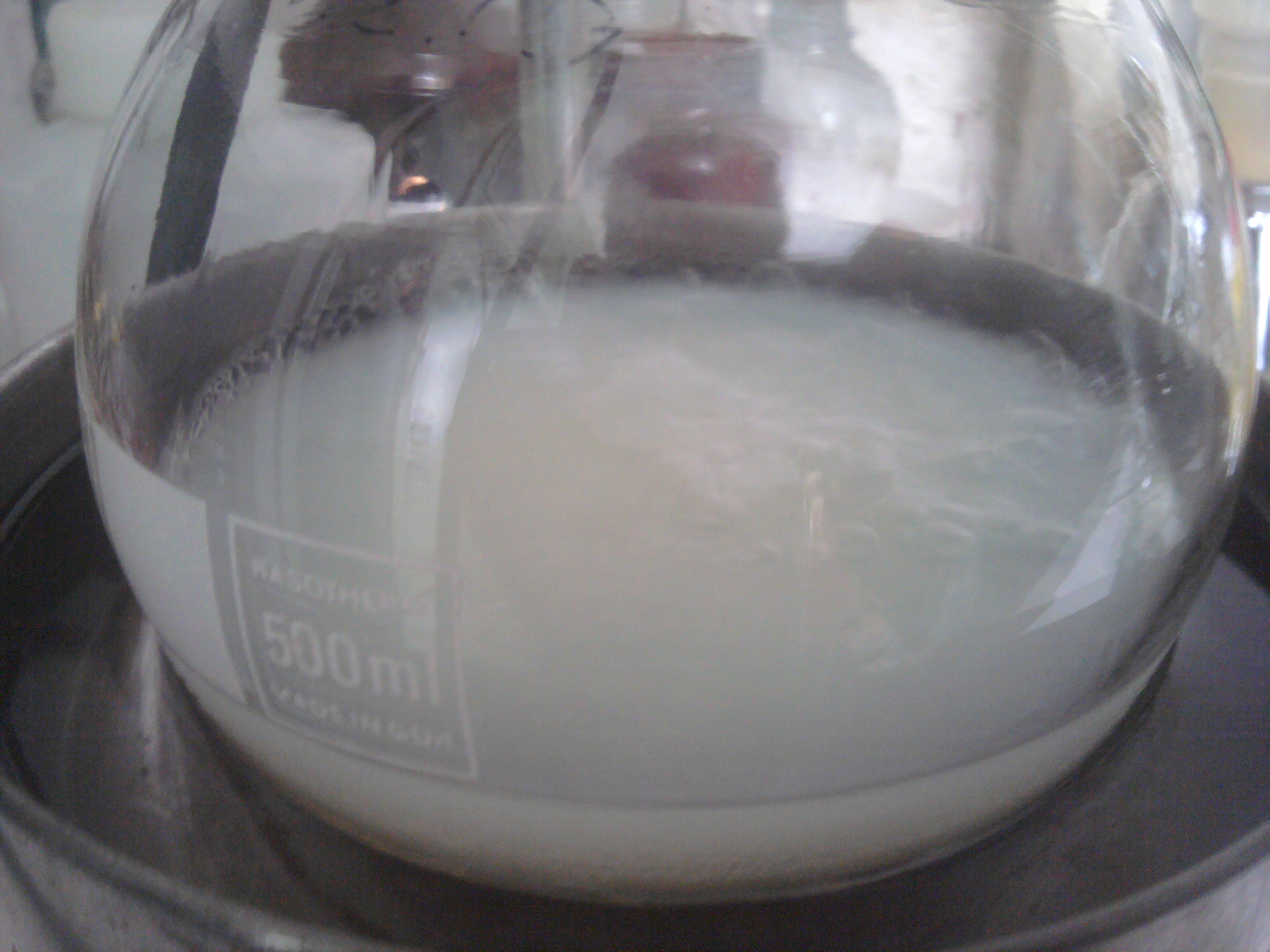

The Finkelstein reaction, named after the German chemist Hans Finkelstein, is a type of S_{N}2 reaction (substitution nucleophilic bimolecular reaction) that involves the exchange of one halogen atom for another. It is an equilibrium reaction, but the reaction can be driven to completion by exploiting the differential solubility of various halide salts, or by using a large excess of the desired halide.

== Method ==
The classic Finkelstein reaction entails the conversion of an alkyl chloride or an alkyl bromide to an alkyl iodide by treatment with a solution of sodium iodide in acetone. Sodium iodide is soluble in acetone while sodium chloride and sodium bromide are not; therefore, the reaction is driven toward products by mass action due to the precipitation of the poorly soluble NaCl or NaBr. An example involves the conversion of the ethyl ester of 5-bromovaleric acid to the iodide:

EtO_{2}C(CH_{2})_{4}Br + NaI → EtO_{2}C(CH_{2})_{4}I + NaBr

Potassium fluoride is used for the conversion of chlorocarbons into fluorocarbons. Such reactions usually employ polar aprotic solvents such as dimethyl formamide, ethylene glycol, and dimethyl sulfoxide.

== Use for analysis ==
Alkyl halides differ greatly in the ease with which they undergo the Finkelstein reaction. The reaction works well for primary (except for neopentyl) halides, and exceptionally well for allyl, benzyl, and α-carbonyl halides. Secondary halides are far less reactive. Vinyl, aryl and tertiary alkyl halides are unreactive; as a result, the reaction of NaI in acetone can be used as a qualitative test to determine which of the aforementioned classes an unknown alkyl halide belongs to, with the exception of alkyl iodides, as they yield the same product upon substitution. Below some relative rates of reaction (NaI in acetone at 60 °C):

Me–Cl	Bu–Cl	i-Pr–Cl	t-BuCH_{2}–Cl	CH_{2}=CH–CH_{2}–Cl	PhCH_{2}–Cl	EtOC(O)CH_{2}–Cl	MeC(O)CH_{2}–Cl
179	1	0.0146	0.00003	64	179	1600	33000

== Aromatic Finkelstein reaction ==
The aromatic chlorides and bromides are not easily substituted by iodide, though they may occur when appropriately catalyzed. The so-called "aromatic Finkelstein reaction" is catalyzed by copper(I) iodide in combination with diamine ligands. Nickel bromide and tri-n-butylphosphine have been found to be suitable catalysts as well.

== See also ==
- Halex process, also a salt metathesis, but for conversion of aryl chlorides to aryl fluorides
