= Salo Finkelstein =

Jewish Polish mental calculator

Salo Finkelstein (born 1896 or 1897, date of death unknown) was a mental calculator. He was born in Łódź (then within the Russian Empire, now in Poland) to a Jewish family.

While at school he was above average in mathematics and discovered his calculating abilities as well as his faculty in memorizing numbers. At the age of 23, he began demonstrating this in public but lost interest for some time. He found employment with the Polish government in the State Statistical office.

In 1928 he performed before Professor Hans Henning in Danzig. Henning previously tested other calculators, Dr. Ferrol and Gottfried Ruckle, and found Finkelstein to be superior. In 1931 Finkelstein went on an international tour demonstrating his abilities and submitting himself for tests.

In 1932 he arrived in the United States and tried without success to find employment in a bank as a checker of calculations. In 1937 an article was published that described and analyzed his abilities, with the general conclusion that although he could perform calculations much more rapidly than most people, his thinking processes seem to obey the same laws and are not indicative of any unnatural powers. In particular, during multiplication, the time for performing operations was proportional not to the number of digits in multiplied numbers, but to the number of separate "acts of attention" necessary to perform multiplication by ordinary rules. Also, the correctness of the results was not always 100 per cent, decreased rapidly with the growth of the number of "acts of attention", and apparently depended on concentration.

After failing to secure himself a job that matched his abilities and unwilling to become a stage calculator, he attempted a career playing chess between 1941 and 1949. After that his further fate is unknown.
