= Daniel Finkelstein =

British journalist and politician (born 1962)

The Right Honourable The Lord Finkelstein OBE
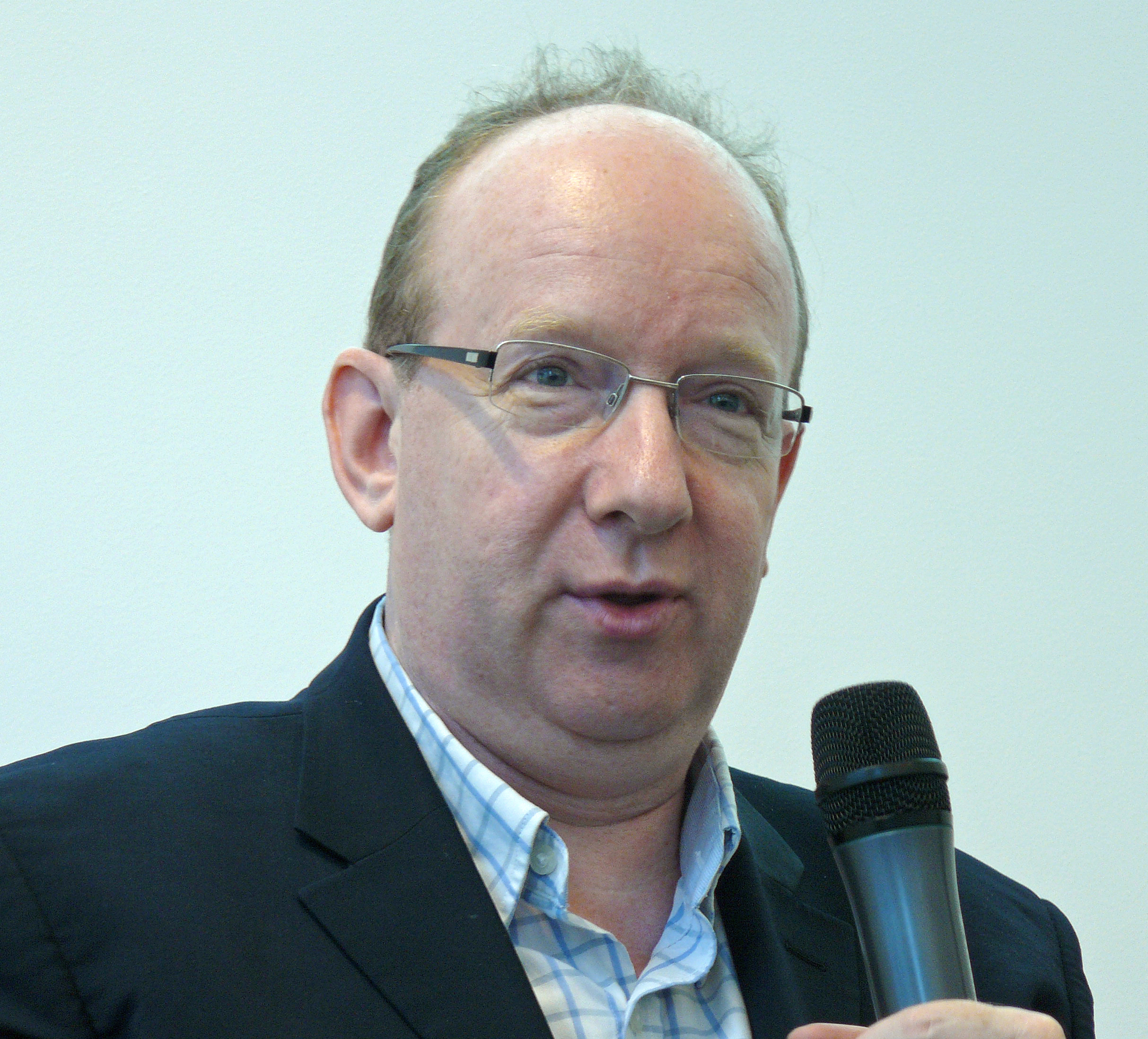
- Finkelstein speaking in 2012

Member of the House of Lords
- Lord Temporal
- Life peerage 11 September 2013

Personal details
- Born: Daniel William Finkelstein; 30 August 1962 (age 64)
- Party: Conservative (1992–present)
- Other political affiliations: Labour (until 1981); SDP (1981–88); 'Continuing' SDP (1988–90)
- Parents: Ludwik Finkelstein (father); Mirjam Finkelstein (mother)
- Relatives: Alfred Wiener (grandfather); Anthony Finkelstein (brother); Tamara Finkelstein (sister)
- Education: University College School; London School of Economics; City University London
- Occupations: Journalist; Politician

Daniel William Finkelstein, Baron Finkelstein (born 30 August 1962) is a British journalist, investor, author, political commentator, government adviser and politician. He is a former executive editor of The Times, where he remains a weekly political columnist, and has been a regular columnist at The Jewish Chronicle since 2010. Finkelstein was formerly an adviser to Prime Minister John Major and leader of the Conservative Party William Hague. Since 2013 he has sat as a Conservative Peer of the House of Lords. Finkelstein is a director of Chelsea football club.

He is a former chairman of Policy Exchange who was succeeded by David Frum in 2014. He is Chairman of the centre-right public policy think tank Onward and was a founding director of the Social Market Foundation. He is also a vice-president of the Jewish Leadership Council and one of the co-hosts of the weekly podcast How To Win An Election from The Times, presented by Hugo Rifkind, alongside Sally Morgan and Polly Mackenzie.

== Early life and education ==
Finkelstein is Jewish; his mother, Mirjam Finkelstein, was a Holocaust survivor of the Bergen-Belsen concentration camp, while his father Ludwik Finkelstein was born in Lwów (then in Poland, but now in Ukraine), and became Professor of Measurement and Instrumentation at City University London. He is a grandson, via his mother, of Dr Alfred Wiener, the Jewish activist and founder of the Wiener Library. He is the brother of Professor Sir Anthony Finkelstein, President of City, University of London and of Tamara Finkelstein, Permanent Secretary at the Department for Environment, Food and Rural Affairs.

He was educated at University College School, the London School of Economics (BSc, 1984) and City University London (MSc, 1986).

== Career ==
=== Politics ===
==== Early years ====
Finkelstein was involved in politics from a young age, and upon turning 16 joined the Young Socialists, the youth wing of the Labour Party. According to his sister Tamara, it was while delivering leaflets that he came across some rival literature put out by the recently formed Social Democratic Party (SDP), and rather than dispose of the material (as he had initially intended to do) he took it home, read it, and left Labour for the SDP shortly afterwards. The journalist Michael White stated that Finkelstein belonged to the right of the Labour Party whilst he was a member, identifying with Hugh Gaitskell and Anthony Crosland.

==== SDP ====
Finkelstein was a member of the SDP from 1981 to 1988, becoming Chair of the Young Social Democrats on the defection of his predecessor Keith Toussaint to the Conservative Party during the 1983 general election campaign. Subsequently, he was elected youth representative on its National Committee and selected as a parliamentary candidate for Brent East at the 1987 general election (where he came third). At around this time, Finkelstein became a close ally and adviser to David Owen, the SDP leader. When the merger with the Liberal Party was proposed, Finkelstein was among the leading opponents and refused to join the merged party, instead following Owen into the 'continuing' SDP. After Owen had announced his resignation from politics in 1992, Finkelstein was the spokesman for a group of young SDP members who joined the Conservatives.

==== Think tanks ====
Before working for the Conservative Party, Finkelstein was Director of a think-tank, the Social Market Foundation, for three years. During his period with the SMF, the organisation brought New York police commissioner Bill Bratton to London, for the first time introducing UK politicians to the new strategies being used there.

Finkelstein formerly sat on the Board of Governors of the Gatestone Institute, a far-right think-tank known for publishing anti-Muslim articles. In a series of tweets in 2018, Finkelstein explained that he "didn't initially accept the critics' characterisation of (Gatestone)", that he thought they'd done "valuable" work, but that he eventually withdrew from the position due to 'the volume' of Gatestone publications he disagreed with. He acknowledged that his failure to do so earlier was "worthy of criticism".

In 2018, he became chairman of the new think-tank Onward, whose mission is to renew the centre right for the next generation.

==== Conservative Party ====
Between 1995 and 1997, Finkelstein was Director of the Conservative Research Department and in that capacity advised Prime Minister John Major and attended meetings of the Cabinet when it sat in political session. Finkelstein became among the earliest advocates of the 'modernisation' of the Conservative Party, laying out the principles of change in a series of speeches and columns in The Times.

Between 1997 and 2001, he was political adviser to the Leader of the Opposition William Hague and, together with George Osborne, Secretary to the Shadow Cabinet.

In the 2001 election, Finkelstein was the unsuccessful Conservative parliamentary candidate in Harrow West.

== Journalism ==
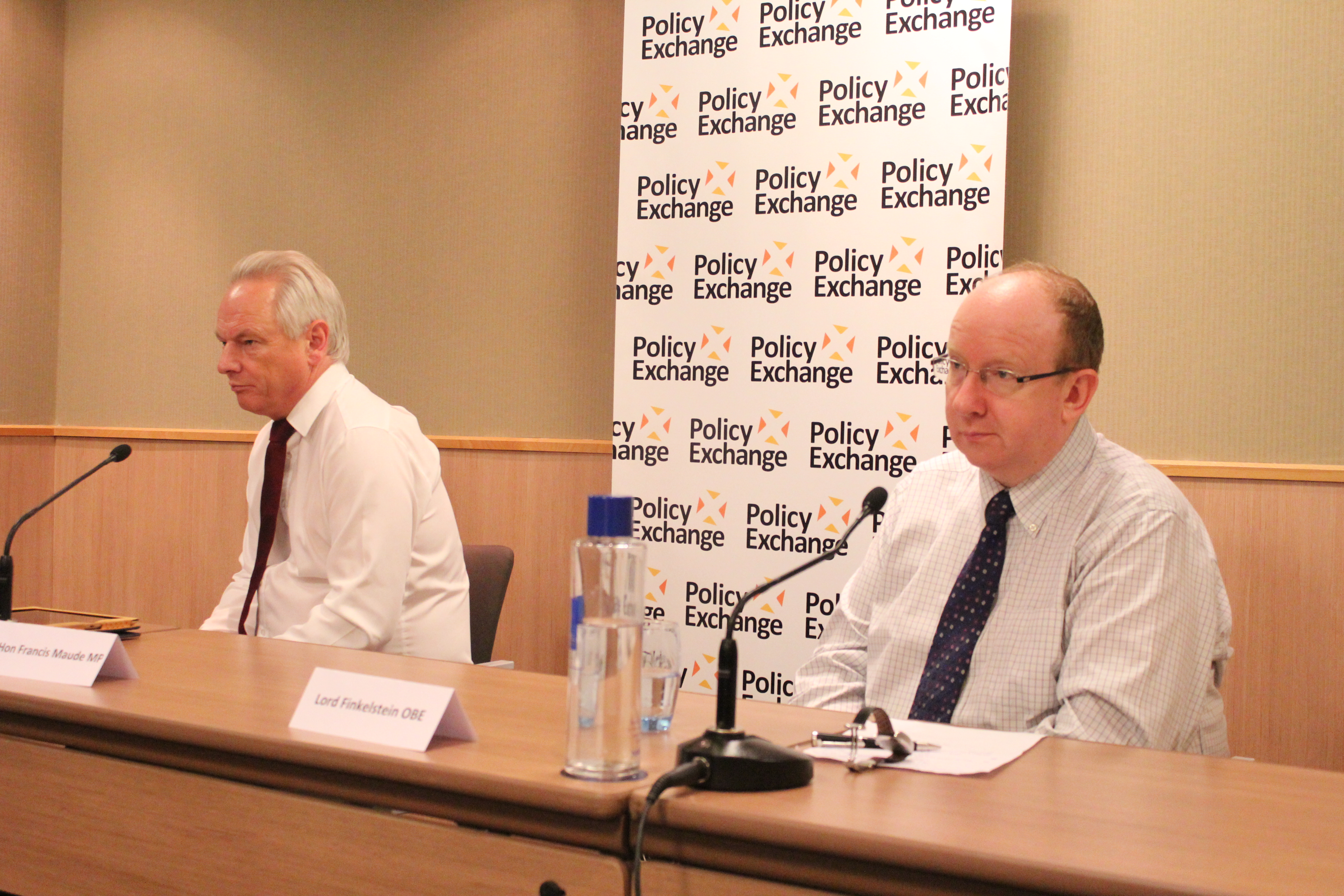
Finkelstein (right) with Francis Maude, at a Policy Exchange event in 2013

Between 1990 and 1992, Finkelstein edited Connexion, Britain's first Internet and data communications newspaper. Finkelstein joined The Times in August 2001 as part of the leader writing team and was Comment Editor from March 2004 to June 2008. He became Chief Leader Writer in 2008. He began The Times blog Comment Central in September 2006. He is also a regular columnist in The Jewish Chronicle. His weekly football statistics column, the Fink Tank, began in 2002 and runs in The Times on Saturdays.

In June 2023, Finkelstein published a memoir, Hitler, Stalin, Mum and Dad: A Family Memoir of Miraculous Survival (published as Two Roads Home: Hitler, Stalin, and the Miraculous Survival of My Family in the United States), describing how his mother survived Hitler's death camps and his father survived slave labour and starvation in Stalin's Siberian Gulag during the Second World War. It was shortlisted for the 2024 Orwell Prize for Political Writing.

Following a December 2025 appearance on Piers Morgan Uncensored, where Finkelstein criticised antisemitic remarks made by far-right activist Nick Fuentes, Finkelstein was the target of a widespread online harassment campaign.

== Other roles ==
In March 2025, Finkelstein was appointed a trustee of the British Museum.

He is also a Director of Chelsea FC Holdings Limited and director, Chelsea Football Club Limited; he has been a fan of the team since childhood.

== Honours and awards ==
Finkelstein was awarded the OBE in the 1997 honours list. In 2011, he was awarded the "PSA 2011 Journalist of the Year Award".

It was announced at the beginning of August 2013 that Finkelstein was to be made a life peer. He was created Baron Finkelstein of Pinner in the London Borough of Harrow on 11 September 2013.

Finkelstein was given an honorary Doctor of Science degree by City University London in 2011.

Orders of precedence in the United Kingdom
Preceded by The Lord Whitby	Gentlemen; Baron Finkelstein	Followed by The Lord Carrington of Fulham
