= Wiener Holocaust Library =

Institution in London

The Wiener Holocaust Library
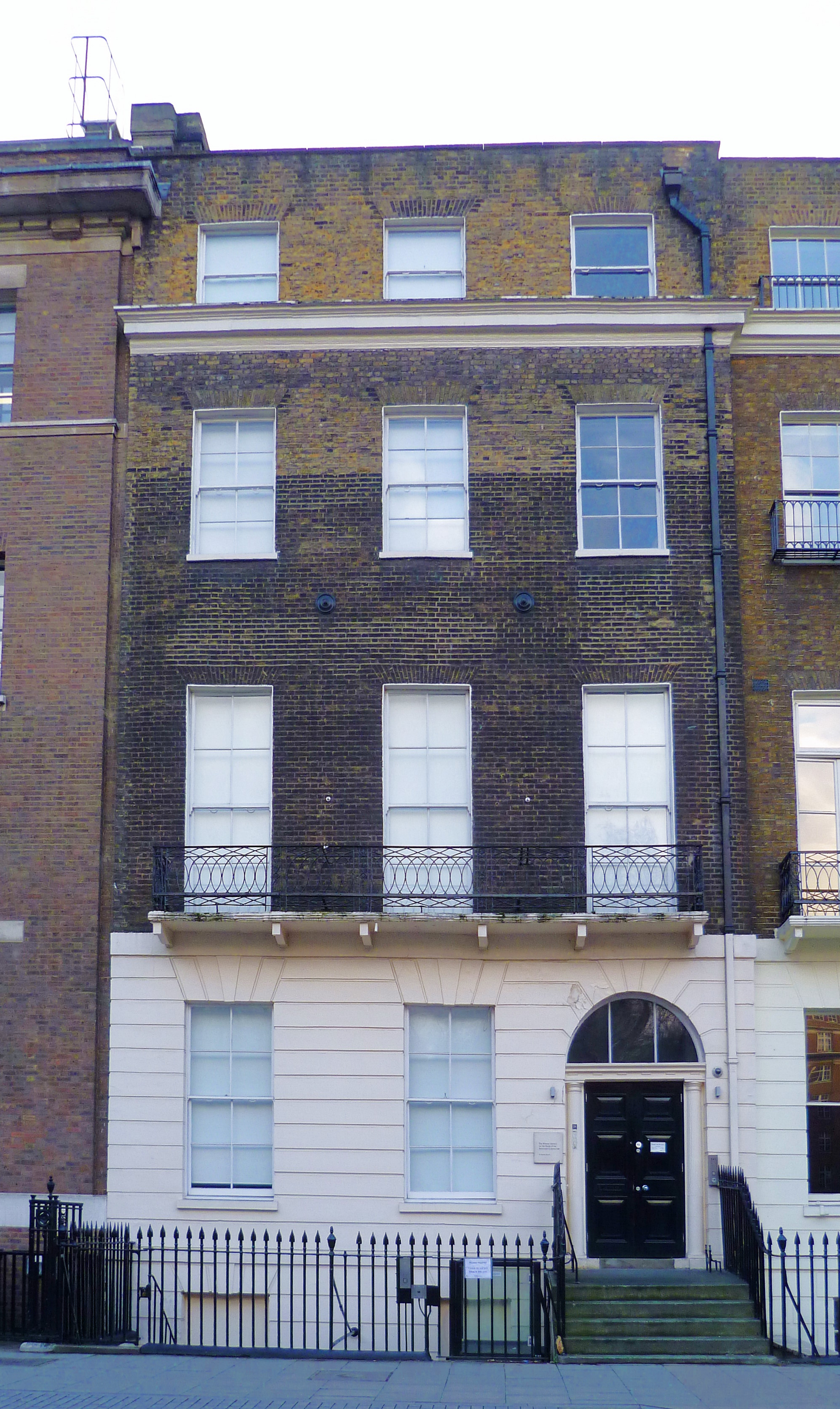
- 51°31′18″N 0°07′41″W
- Location: 29 Russell Square; London, WC1B, United Kingdom
- Established: 1933 (93 years ago)

Collection
- Items collected: Books, pamphlets, serials, photographs, family papers, films & documentaries
- Size: 70,000 books and pamphlets 2,000 document collections 45,000 photographs 3,000 periodical series

Access and use
- Access requirements: Open to anyone

Other information
- Director: Dr Toby Simpson (director)
- Website: wienerholocaustlibrary.org

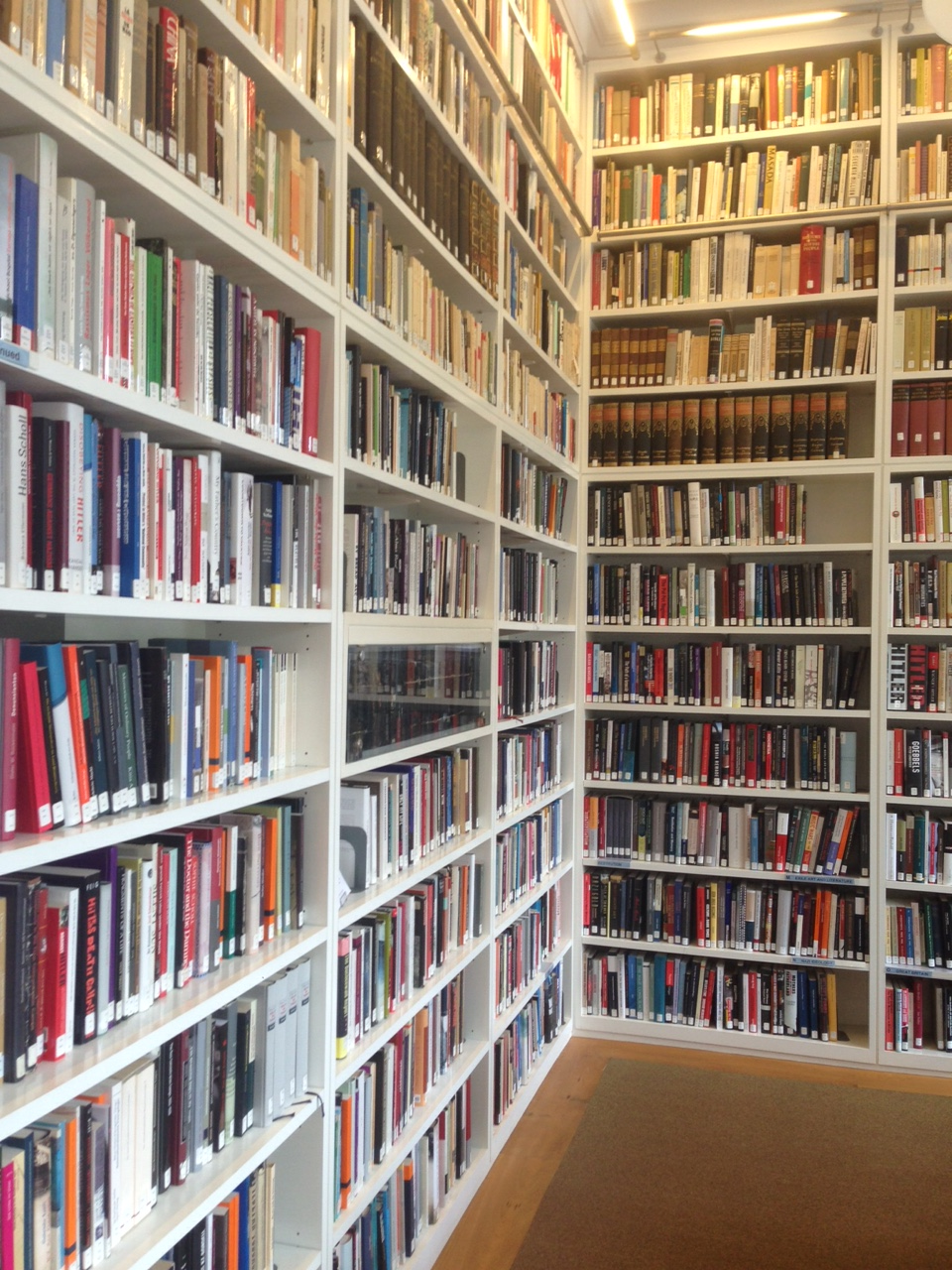
Book shelves in the reading room

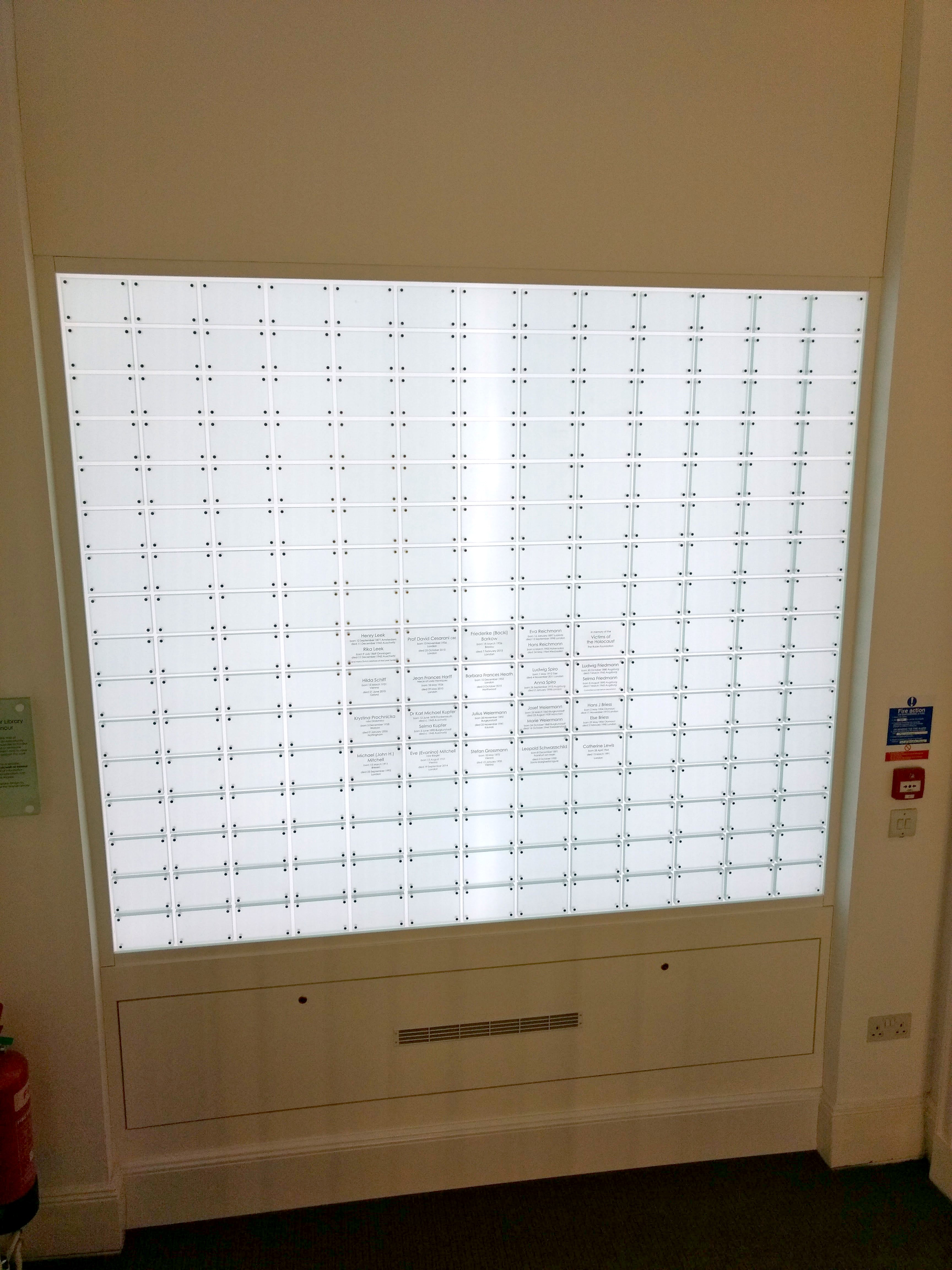
The Wall of Honour on the first floor

The Wiener Holocaust Library (German pronunciation: [ˈviːnɐ]) is the world's oldest institution devoted to the study of the Holocaust, its causes and legacies. Founded in 1933 as an information bureau that informed Jewish communities and governments worldwide about the persecution of the Jews under the Nazis, it was transformed into a research institute and public access library after the end of World War II and is situated in Russell Square, London.

In 2017, and following a campaign by Daniel Plesch (director of the Centre for International Studies and Diplomacy at SOAS University of London) and other researchers, directed at the UN, the library published an online and searchable version of the catalogue of the archive of the UN War Crimes Commission. It is also home to the UK's digital copy of the International Tracing Service archive, the physical copy of which is held in the Arolsen Archives – International Center on Nazi Persecution in Bad Arolsen, Germany.

Alfred Wiener, who founded the library, was the maternal grandfather of Lord Daniel Finkelstein OBE, a British journalist and former political adviser. The formation of the library and the struggles to maintain it are outlined in Finkelstein's book about his family's experiences during the Holocaust.

== History ==
Alfred Wiener, a German Jew who worked for the Centralverein deutscher Staatsbürger jüdischen Glaubens (Central Association of German Citizens of Jewish Faith), a Jewish civil rights group, spent years documenting the rise of antisemitism. He collected books, photographs, letters, magazines and other materials, including school primers and children's games, recording the spread of Nazi propaganda and its racist doctrines.

In 1933, Wiener fled Germany for Amsterdam, where he operated the Jewish Central Information Office (JCIO). Dr. David Cohen became its president. Cohen was a prominent Dutch Jew who founded the Committee for Jewish Refugees at the same time; the Committee used the work of the JCIO for its publications, and provided some financial support to the JCIO.

After Kristallnacht in November 1938, Wiener and the JCIO archives were relocated in Britain. Wiener's wife Margarethe (née Saulmann) and three daughters Ruth, Eva, and Mirjam remained in the Netherlands and on 20 June 1943 were detained by the Nazis and sent to Westerbork transit camp. In January 1944, after seven months in Westerbork, the family were deported to Bergen-Belsen. In January 1945, a rare opportunity to be part of a prisoner scheme between the Nazis and the United States appeared. The Wieners were chosen for this exchange and transported to Switzerland. Shortly afterward, Margarethe became too ill to continue travelling. On 25 January 1945, she was taken into a Swiss hospital and died just a few hours later. Soon after, Ruth, Eva, and Mirjam boarded a Red Cross ship, the Gripsholm, bound for New York where they were reunited with their father.

The collection opened in London on 1 September 1939, the day of the Nazi invasion of Poland. In London, the Jewish Central Information Office functioned as a private intelligence service. Wiener was paid by the British government to keep Britain informed of developments in Germany. The Library remained true to its original purpose by documenting specifically the fate of Europe's Jewish population as exemplified by its own publication, Jewish News.

Following the end of World War II, the library used its extensive collections on National Socialism and the Third Reich to provide material to the United Nations War Crimes Commission for bringing war criminals to justice. Increasingly the collection was referred to as ‘Dr Wiener's Library' and eventually this led to its renaming.

The Library published a bi-monthly bulletin commencing in November 1946 (and which continued until 1983) drew heavily on the library's own source material. Another important task during the 1950s and 1960s was the gathering of eyewitness accounts, a resource that was to become a unique and important part of the Library's collection. The accounts were collected systematically by a team of interviewers. In 1964, the Institute of Contemporary History was established and took up the neglected field of modern European history within The Wiener Library.

During a funding crisis in 1974, it was decided to move a part of the collection to Tel Aviv. In the course of the preparations for this move, a large part of the collections was microfilmed for conservation purposes. The plans to move the library were abandoned in 1980 after the transports had already begun, resulting in a separate Wiener Library within the library of the University of Tel Aviv that consisted of the majority of the book stock, while The Wiener Library in London retained the microfilmed copies.

Today, The Wiener Holocaust Library is a research library dedicated to studying the Holocaust, comparative genocide studies, Nazi Germany, and German Jewry, and documenting Antisemitism and Neonazism. It is a registered charity under English law. In 2011, it moved from Devonshire Street to new premises in Russell Square.

Much of the artwork of Fred Kormis, creator of England's first Holocaust memorial, was displayed at an exhibition at the library, which was scheduled to run until 6 February 2025.

== Collections and Outreach ==
=== Collections ===
The Wiener Holocaust Library has been collecting material related to the Holocaust, its causes and legacies since 1933. Its holdings contain approximately 70,000 books and pamphlets, 2,000 physical document collections, 45,000 photographs and 3,000 periodical titles (including 110 current subscriptions), 1 million press cuttings, as well as posters, objects, artworks, digital collections, and audiovisual materials.

In 2025 the Wiener Holocaust Library launched an online archive, Wiener Digital Collections, allowing researchers to access digitised materials from the collection around the world.

=== Outreach ===
==== Exhibitions ====
The Wiener Holocaust Library offers free public access to three temporary exhibitions a year in the ground floor exhibition space, in addition to a number of mini Reading Room exhibitions, travelling exhibitions, and online exhibitions.

==== The Holocaust Explained ====
Since 2015, the Library has also been the custodian of The Holocaust Explained, an educational website aiming to help British schoolchildren learn about the Nazi era and the Holocaust.

The website is designed with the British school curriculum for thirteen to eighteen year olds in mind, but it aims to be accessible to other users as well. It covers topics from the historical background of antisemitism through to the legacy of the Holocaust, drawing on the Library's unique archival materials to illustrate each section.

==== The Refugee Map ====
In November 2021 the Library relaunched the Refugee Map, a “digital map [which] traces refugee journeys through photographs, diaries, letters, and interviews”. As of April 2024 the map contains 440 records, 111 collections, 4 journeys and 118 map overlays, several of which are historical maps of Europe and the world.

==== The Fraenkel Prize ====
The Library also awards the Fraenkel Prize in Contemporary History. This prize, founded by the late Ernst Fraenkel OBE (former Chairman and Joint Library President), is awarded annually for "outstanding work of twentieth-century history in one of The Wiener Holocaust Library's fields of interest." These areas of interest include the following: "The History of Europe, Jewish History, The Two World Wars, Antisemitism, Comparative Genocide, Political Extremism."

== See also ==
- Austrian Holocaust Memorial Service
- Stephen Roth Institute
- Joan Stiebel
