= Finkel =

Finkel, Finckel or Finkle is a surname. Notable people with the name include:

- Alan Finkel (born 1953), Australian Chief Scientist
- Aryeh Finkel (1931–2016), rosh yeshiva of the Brachfeld branch of the Mir yeshiva
- Benjamin Finkel (1865–1947), American mathematician and educator
- Binyomin Beinush Finkel (1911–1990), rosh yeshiva of the Mir yeshiva in Jerusalem
- Caroline Finkel, British historian
- Edwin Finckel (1917–2001), American jazz performer, arranger and song composer
- Eliezer Yehuda Finkel (born 1879) (1879–1965), rosh yeshiva of the Mir yeshiva in Poland and in Jerusalem
- Eliezer Yehuda Finkel (born 1965), rosh yeshiva of the Mir yeshiva in Jerusalem
- Eliyahu Boruch Finkel (1947–2008), lecturer at the Mir yeshiva in Jerusalem
- Frank Finkel (1854–1930), American who claimed to have been the only survivor of the Battle of the Little Bighorn
- Frederick C. Finkle (1865–1949), American consulting engineer and geologist
- Fyvush Finkel (1922–2016), American actor
- George Finkel (1936–2019), American TV sports producer and director, son of Maurice
- Howard Finkel (1950–2020), American wrestling announcer
- Irving Finkel (born 1951), British philologist and Assyriologist
- Jon Finkel (born 1978), American Magic: The Gathering player
- Maurice Herman Finkel (1888–1949), American architect and Yiddish theatre performer, father of George
- Miriam Posner Finkel (1916–1999), American radiobiologist and molecular biologist
- Moishe Finkel (c. 1850–1904), Yiddish theatre actor, director and producer
- Nosson Tzvi Finkel (Slabodka) (1849–1927), Lithuanian leader of Orthodox Judaism in Eastern Europe and founder of the Slabodka yeshiva
- Nosson Tzvi Finkel (Mir) (1943–2011), rosh yeshiva of the Mir yeshiva in Jerusalem
- Raphael Finkel (born 1951), American computer scientist
- Robbi Finkel (born 1950), American composer
- Shelly Finkel (born 1944), American boxing and music promoter
- Terri H. Finkel (born 1953), American pediatric rheumatologist and immunologist

Fictional characters include:

- Gary Finkel, in the videogame Dead Rising 3
- Harper Finkle, in the TV series Wizards of Waverly Place
- Ray Finkle, in the film Ace Ventura: Pet Detective
- Sharon Finkel, in the TV series The Flash

== See also ==
- Fin. K.L. (Korean: 핑클), Korean female pop group
- Finkelstein, a related surname
