= Centralverein deutscher Staatsbürger jüdischen Glaubens =

Jewish political organization in Germany

The Centralverein deutscher Staatsbürger jüdischen Glaubens (also: Zentral-Verein, Central Verein, CV, C.V., C.-V.) (Central Association of German Citizens of Jewish Faith) was founded by German Jewish intellectuals on 26 March 1893 in Berlin, with the intention of opposing the rise of antisemitism in the German Empire. Shortly after its founding it had 1,420, and in 1926 approximately 60,000 members.

== History ==
It was founded in Berlin by Jewish intellectuals on 26 March 1893. The CV’s aim was to unify German citizens of Jewish faith, to fight for the Jews’ rights as citizens and to combat rising antisemitism. Commitment to the German Nation was an important part of the CV’s agenda - the members saw themselves primarily as German citizens with their own religion. Consequently, the CV repudiated Zionism. Through educational work, it attempted to spread knowledge about Judaism and strengthen Jewish self-confidence. This is particularly evident in the close relationship between the Centralverein and the Hochschule für die Wissenschaft des Judentums, as both Jewish institutions in pre-war Berlin formed a network independent of their respective denominations.

Beginning in 1922, the CV published a weekly newspaper, called C.V.-Zeitung (C.V.-Newspaper) and continued fighting the rising antisemitic threat. Through publications and conversations with the President of Germany Paul von Hindenburg and economic leaders, the CV tried to call attention to the threat. In 1926, there were approximately 60,000 members.

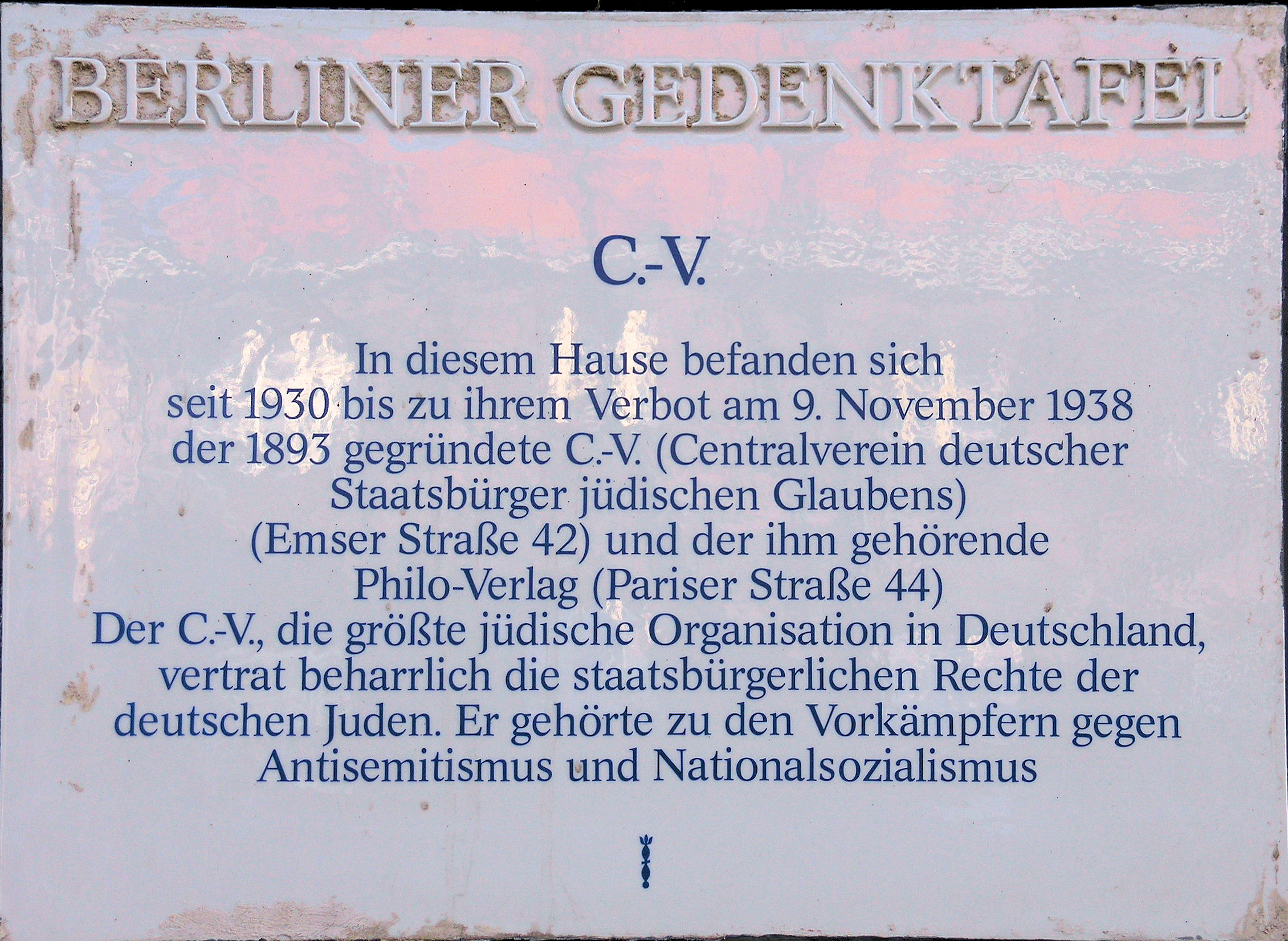
Plaque outside the Pariser Strasse offices

In 1928 the "Büro Wilhelmstrasse" (Wilhelmstrasse Office) was created with the instrumental support of Alfred Wiener. It documented Nazi activities and issued anti-Nazi materials until 1933, when Hitler came to power. During the Nazi era, the CV was forced to change its name several times. From 1936 onwards it was called "Jüdischer Central Verein" (Jewish Central Association). After the Kristallnacht (Night of Broken Glass or November Pogrom) in 1938 the CV had to stop publishing its newspaper and the association was prohibited a short time later. Nevertheless, this did not mean the end of the Centralverein's library, which was only confiscated on March 1, 1939; the letter to the Reichsführer SS provides a detailed insight into the holdings of the C.V. library.

== Bibliography ==
- Evyatar Friesel: "The Political and Ideological Development of the Centralverein before 1914". In: Leo Baeck Institute Yearbook 31 (1986), pp. 121–146.
- Ismar Schorsch: Jewish Reactions to Anti-Semitism 1870–1914. New York/ London/ Philadelphia 1972, ISBN 0-231-03643-4.
- Jacob Toury: "Organizational Problems of German Jewry. Steps towards the Establishment of a Central Organization (1893-1920)". In: Leo Baeck Institute Yearbook 13 (1968), pp. 57–90.
- Jehuda Reinharz: Fatherland or Promised Land. The Dilemma of the German Jew 1893–1914. Ann Arbor 1975, ISBN 0-472-76500-0.
