= Alfred Wiener =

Founder of the Wiener Library

Alfred Wiener (16 March 1885 – 4 February 1964) was a German Jew who dedicated much of his life to documenting antisemitism and racism in Germany and Europe, in addition to uncovering crimes by Germany's Nazi government. He is best remembered as the founder and long-time director of the Wiener Library.

== Biography ==
Born in Potsdam, Germany, in 1885, Wiener trained as an Arabist in Berlin and Heidelberg, spending 1909 to 1911 in the Middle East. His studies of Arabic led to a doctorate in 1913. Wiener served as a translator in the First World War, and was awarded the Iron Cross (2nd Class) and the Iron Crescent.

From 1919, Wiener was a high-ranking official in the Centralverein deutscher Staatsbürger jüdischen Glaubens (Central Association of German Citizens of Jewish Faith, CV), and identified the Nazi Party as the chief danger to the Jews of Germany and to German society as a whole as early as 1925.

With his family, he moved to Amsterdam in 1933, where he operated the Jewish Central Information Office (JCIO). After Kristallnacht in November 1938, Wiener relocated to Britain. He was able to obtain fake Paraguayan passports for his family, but the visas arrived after the German invasion of the Netherlands in May 1940.

Wiener's wife, Margarethe (née Saulmann) and three daughters, Ruth, Eva, and Mirjam remained in the Netherlands. On 20 June 1943, they were detained by the Nazis and sent to Westerbork transit camp. In January 1944, the family were deported to Bergen-Belsen concentration camp. Members of the family were part of a prisoner exchange at the Swiss border in January 1945. Wiener's wife, Margarethe became too ill to travel, and died on 25 January 1945 in a Swiss hospital. Ruth, Eva, and Mirjam boarded a Red Cross ship, the MS Gripsholm, bound for New York, where they were reunited with their father.

Wiener became a naturalised British citizen in 1946. In 1953, he married Lotte Philips. The couple lived in Golders Green, north west London. Wiener retired as director of the Wiener Library in 1961. He died at his home in Hendon, north west London, in 1964, aged 78.

== Anti-Nazi activities ==
In 1928, Wiener was instrumental in creating the Büro Wilhelmstrasse of the CV, which documented Nazi activities and issued anti-Nazi materials until 1933, when Hitler came to power. Wiener and his family fled to Amsterdam, where he, together with David Cohen of Amsterdam University, founded the Jewish Central Information Office (JCIO). In 1939, Wiener and the collection transferred to London.

Wiener spent most of the war years in the United States, collecting materials for the JCIO and working for the British and American governments. He returned in 1945 to transform the Information Office into a library and centre for the scholarly study of the Nazi era.

From the mid-1950s, Wiener travelled frequently to Germany to speak to groups of young people and establish contact with Christian groups.

Two of the pamphlets he originally published in German in Germany, Prelude to Pogroms? Facts for the Thoughtful (1919) and German Judaism in Political, Economic and Cultural Terms (1924), were published together in an English translation as The Fatherland and the Jews in 2021.

== Awards ==
In 1955, Wiener was awarded the highest civilian decoration of West Germany, the Grand Cross of the Order of Merit (Grosses Verdienstkreuz des Verdienstordens).

== See also ==
- Hitler, Stalin, Mum and Dad, a 2023 memoir by Daniel Finkelstein, Wiener's grandson
