= Franzi Groszmann =

Franziska "Franzi" Stern Groszmann (December 27, 1904 – September 20, 2005) was possibly the last surviving mother of the Kindertransport. She sent her daughter (born 1928), now a writer known as Lore Segal, to England following Kristallnacht. Groszmann's husband, Ignatz, a Vienna accountant before the Holocaust, died at the end of World War II following a series of strokes.

Segal, with her mother and grandmother, emigrated to New York City from the Dominican Republic in 1951 and lived together in a small apartment on the Upper West Side of Manhattan.

== Media ==
Groszmann served as a consultant on the documentary Into the Arms of Strangers: Stories of the Kindertransport. Groszmann and Segal also appeared in Melissa Hacker's Academy Award-winning 1996 film My Knees Were Jumping.

== Death ==
Groszmann died on September 20, 2005, aged 100. She was survived by her daughter, two grandchildren, two great-grandsons and a brother, Paul Stern.
