= Hershey Felder =

Canadian actor, playwright, and pianist

- Born: July 9, 1968 (age 58)
- Occupations: Playwright, actor, pianist
- Spouse: Kim Campbell (m. 1997)
- Website: www.hersheyfelder.net

Hershey Felder (born July 9, 1968) is a Canadian pianist, actor, and playwright known for his portrayals of classical and American composers on the theatrical stage.

== Early life ==
Felder was born in Montreal, Quebec, to Jacob Felder (born 1929 in Ustrzyki, Poland) and Eva Surek Felder (born 1946 in Budapest, Hungary). He was raised in a Yiddish-speaking home mainly, from age 13, by his widower father.

== Career ==
Felder traveled to Los Angeles in 1994 and worked briefly for the Steven Spielberg Shoah Foundation, now the USC Shoah Foundation, where, using his knowledge of Yiddish and French, he interviewed Holocaust survivors to preserve their oral histories on film. The following year, he attended the 50th anniversary of the liberation of Auschwitz in Poland, where he met Helmuth Spryzcer, who as a boy was made to whistle Gershwin's Rhapsody in Blue to the German guards. This led Felder to create Sing! A Musical Journey, about two Holocaust survivors, with Rhapsody in Blue at the conclusion. For nearly two years, Felder focused on the persona and music of George Gershwin, meeting with many of Gershwin's family members, and in 1999 he created at Los Angeles Tiffany Theatre a workshop production of a one-man show, George Gershwin Alone, which has since had more than 40 productions in theatres in the United States, Canada, the United Kingdom, and Italy. George Gershwin Alone was followed by Monsieur Chopin (premier Royal George Theatre, Chicago, 2005) and Beethoven, As I Knew Him (Old Globe Theatre San Diego, 2008).

In 2010, he premiered his one-man play-with-music about Leonard Bernstein, Maestro at the Geffen Theatre in Los Angeles. In 2013, Felder received a letter from Russian Theatrical Producers inviting him to portray Peter Ilyich Tchaikovsky. The same month, Russian Duma - Russian Parliament, had passed anti-gay legislation. Since Tchaikovsky is believed to have been homosexual, Felder named his work "Our Great Tchaikovsky", performing it only in the U.S.

A 2014 American Theatre profile referred to Felder as being "in a category all his own". His major portrayals are those of George Gershwin, Frédéric Chopin, Ludwig van Beethoven, Pyotr Ilyich Tchaikovsky, and Claude Debussy. After a storied gestation period of two years, including meetings with many of the Irving Berlin family members, he has given a much-requested dramatic impersonation of the American songwriter Irving Berlin.

In 2013, Felder directed concert pianist Mona Golabek in The Pianist of Willesden Lane, in his adaptation of her book The Children of Willesden Lane, telling the story of Golabek's mother as an adolescent in the Kindertransport during World War II.

As a composer, Felder's works include Noah's Ark, an Opera, Aliyah Concerto on Israeli Themes, as well as Song Settings (the poetry of Vachel Lindsay), Etudes Thematiques, Les Preludes. In September 2010, An American Story was recorded with the Ars Viva Symphony Orchestra of Chicago.

On May 10, 2020, Felder live-streamed his one-man play Hershey Felder as Irving Berlin from his home in Florence, Italy to selected audiences throughout the United States. The production was a fundraiser for the San Diego Repertory Theatre; along with a dozen other theaters at which Felder performs. On July 12, Felder performed another online benefit of his one-man show Hershey Felder: Beethoven. In 2020 Felder went onto create the broadcast entertainment brand Live From Florence which broadcasts original productions performed and filmed on location for worldwide audiences.

In November 2021, Felder moved away from live-streamed theater to on-demand musical films with the premiere airing of Dante and Beatrice in Florence, for which he wrote both the script and the score, co-directed the film, and performed two roles as well as playing the piano and singing.

In 2022, Felder produced, narrated, conducted interviews, and, on the piano, accompanied cellist Amit Peled in the movie, "Musical Tales of the Venetian Jewish Ghetto".

== Personal life ==
Felder is married to former Prime Minister of Canada Kim Campbell. They share residences in Paris and Florence.

== List of one-man shows ==
Felder has created and performed the following one-man shows.

Title	Release date	Notes
George Gershwin Alone	1999	Felder's portrayal of pianist George Gershwin began as a Los Angeles workshop.
Monsieur Chopin	2005	A musical examination of Frédéric Chopin.
Beethoven, as I Knew Him	2008	A concert, lecture and dramatized play about Ludwig van Beethoven.
Maestro (Leonard Bernstein)	2010	A bio-drama about Leonard Bernstein, first performed at the Geffen Theater in 2010.
Hershey Felder as Irving Berlin	2014	A musical biography, character study and piano performance of songwriter Irving Berlin.
Our Great Tchaikovsky	2017	The story of Tchaikovsky brought to life through music and characterization.
A Paris Love Story	2019	Felder portrays pianist Claude Debussy in Paris.
Anna & Sergei	2021	Felder plays Russian pianist and composer Sergei Rachmaninoff.

== Discography ==
- Broadway in Concert (2004)
- Love Songs of the Yiddish Theatre
- Back from Broadway
- George Gershwin Alone (2005)
- Monsieur Chopin (in association with WFMT Radio Network Recordings)
- Beethoven As I Knew Him
- An American Story
- Hershey Felder as Irving Berlin (2018)
- Our Great Tchaikovsky (2019)
- Beethoven (2019)
