= Lore Segal =

American writer (1928–2024)

- Segal in 1939
- Born: Lore Vailer Groszmann; March 8, 1928; Vienna, Austria
- Died: October 7, 2024 (aged 96); New York City, New York, U.S.
- Education: University of London (BA)
- Occupations: Author; teacher; translator
- Spouse: David Segal (m. 1961; died 1970)
- Children: 2
- Writing career
- Period: 1964–2024

Lore Segal (née Groszmann; March 8, 1928 – October 7, 2024) was an Austrian-American novelist, translator, teacher, short story writer, and author of children's books. She was the author of five novels, and was known for her autobiographical fiction, drawing on her life as an Austrian Jewish refugee who fled to the United Kingdom as a child, growing up in England before settling in the United States. Her fourth novel, Shakespeare's Kitchen, was a finalist for the Pulitzer Prize in 2008.

== Early life ==
An only child, Lore Groszmann was born on March 8, 1928, in Vienna, Austria, into a middle-class Jewish family. Her father, Ignatz, was a chief bank accountant, and her mother, Franziska, was a housewife.

When Hitler annexed Austria in 1938, Groszmann's father found himself jobless and threatened. He listed the family on the American immigration quota, and in December that year Lore Segal joined other Jewish children on the first wave of the Kindertransport rescue mission, seeking safety in England.

While with her English foster parents, she found a purple notebook and started writing, filling its 36 pages with German prose. It was the beginning of a novel she would eventually write in English, Other People's Houses.

On her eleventh birthday, her parents arrived in England on a domestic servants visa. Despite his refugee status, Ignatz Groszmann was labeled a German-speaking alien and interned on the Isle of Man, where he suffered a series of strokes. He died a few days before the war ended. Lore Groszmann and her mother then moved to London, where she attended the Bedford College for Women at the University of London on a scholarship. She graduated in 1948 with an honours degree in English literature.

In 1951, after spending three years in the Dominican Republic with her mother, waiting for their US entry permit to arrive, they moved to Washington Heights, New York City, where they shared a two-room apartment with her grandmother and uncle.

In 1961, she married David Segal, an editor at Knopf.

== Career ==
Between 1968 and 1996, Segal taught writing at Columbia University's School of the Arts, Princeton, Bennington College, Sarah Lawrence, the University of Illinois at Chicago, and Ohio State University, from which she retired in 1996. She later taught at 92NY.

Segal published her first novel, Other People's Houses, in 1964 to widespread acclaim. Collecting her refugee stories from The New Yorker and writing a few more, Segal fictionalized her experience growing up in different households in England.

In 1985, Segal's third novel, Her First American, was published, which The New York Times praised, saying, "Lore Segal may have come closer than anyone to writing The Great American Novel." It tells the story of Ilka Weissnix, a Jewish refugee from Nazi Europe, and her relationship with Carter Bayoux, a middle-aged black intellectual, "her first American." Segal based the character of Carter Bayoux on her friend Horace R. Cayton Jr., with whom she had been in a relationship for five years. She received an American Academy of Arts and Letters Award for the novel.

Shakespeare's Kitchen, published in 2007, was a finalist for the Pulitzer Prize. Thirteen stories make up the novel, set in a think tank affiliated with a liberal college in Connecticut. Segal evokes the comic melancholy of the outsider and the ineffectual ambitions of a progressive, predominantly WASP-ish institution. Tragedy and loss haunt characters as they plan an academic symposium on genocide, while their lives of privilege contrast starkly with the lives of residents of a derelict housing project next door. The novel was republished in slightly revised form in 2024 in the UK as "An Absence of Cousins."

A fifth novel, Half the Kingdom, was published by Melville House in October 2013.

Regarding her work, Segal said, "I want to write about the stuff – in the midst of all the stew of being a human being – that is permanent, where Adam and Eve and I would have had the same experiences. I really am less interested in the social change." Her novels often deal with the process of assimilation, from a refugee arriving in a new country which must become her home (as in Her First American), to a flighty poet finding her footing in a constantly moving literary world (as in Lucinella).

Segal continued to write until the end of her life, authoring short stories in The New Yorker. The theme of many of these, written in her 90s, was ‘Ladies’ Lunch’, in which a group of elderly women in Manhattan meet up to puzzle, and laugh at, the enigmas and affronts of ageing. These were collected and published as a novella in 2023, as ‘Ladies Lunch’. In the title story, one of their number is placed unhappily in a home and the others conspire to spring her. Segal had a late flowering of success for the volume and continued writing ‘Ladies Lunch’ stories up until her last days. The final one, authored by dictation as her health declined, was published by the New Yorker a week before her death. She had been writing continuously for the magazine since 1960.

== Personal life and death ==
Segal and her husband, David, were married for nine years, until his death from a heart attack in 1970, aged 42. They had two children.

Segal and her mother, Franzi Groszmann, appeared in the films My Knees Were Jumping; Remembering the Kindertransports (1996), directed by Melissa Hacker, which was short-listed for Academy Award nomination, and Into the Arms of Strangers: Stories of the Kindertransport, directed by Mark Jonathan Harris and produced by Deborah Oppenheimer, which won the Academy Award for Documentary Feature in 2001. Segal's mother was the last survivor of the parents who placed their children in the Kindertransport program. Franzi died in 2005, one hundred years old.

Segal lived on the Upper West Side of Manhattan. She entered palliative care at her home after an apparent heart attack in June 2024, and died there from heart failure on October 7, 2024, at the age of 96.

== Work ==
=== Novels ===
- — (1964). Other People's Houses. New York: Harcourt, Brace & World. LCCN 63013508. OCLC 1397008.
- — (1976). Lucinella: A Novel. New York: Farrar, Straus and Giroux. ISBN 0374194254. OCLC 2332250.
- — (1985). Her First American: A Novel. New York: Alfred A. Knopf. ISBN 0394536274. OCLC 230810163.
- — (2007). Shakespeare's Kitchen. New York: W. W. Norton & Company. ISBN 9781595581518. OCLC 71322296. Republished in revised form as ‘An Absence of Cousins’, 2024, by Sort Of Books.
- — (2013). Half the Kingdom. Brooklyn, NY: Melville House. ISBN 9781612193021. OCLC 844789831.
- — (2023). Ladies' Lunch: A Novella and Other Stories. London, UK: Sort Of Books. ISBN 9781914502033. OCLC 844789831.

=== Translations ===
- — (1967). Gallows Songs of Christian Morgenstern. Translated by Snodgrass, W. D.; Segal, Lore. Ann Arbor, MI: University of Michigan Press. LCCN 67025337. OCLC 1079207255.
- Grimm, Jacob; Grimm, Wilhelm K. (1973). The Juniper Tree and Other Tales from Grimm. Translated by Segal, Lore; Jarrell, Randall. Illustrated by Maurice Sendak. New York: Farrar, Straus and Giroux. ISBN 0374180571. OCLC 1366874. Two volumes.
- — (1987). The Book of Adam to Moses. Translated by Segal, Lore; Baskin, Leonard. New York: Knopf Books for Young Readers. ISBN 0394867572. OCLC 15108198.
- — (1991). The Story of King Saul and King David. Translated by Segal, Lore. New York: Schocken Books. ISBN 0805240888. OCLC 22862641.

=== Children's books ===
- — (1970). Tell Me a Mitzi. Illustrated by Harriet Pincus. New York: Farrar, Straus and Giroux. LCCN 69014980. OCLC 26667931.
- — (1973). All the Way Home. Illustrated by James Marshall. New York: Farrar, Straus and Giroux. ISBN 0374302154. OCLC 1062877.
- — (1977). Tell Me a Trudy. Illustrated by Rosemary Wells. New York: Farrar, Straus and Giroux. ISBN 0374373957. OCLC 3121083.
- — (1981). The Story of Old Mrs. Brubeck and How She Looked for Trouble and Where She Found Him. Illustrated by Marcia Sewall. New York: Pantheon Books. ISBN 0394840399. OCLC 4592988.
- — (1985). The Story of Mrs. Lovewright and Purrless Her Cat. Illustrated by Paul O. Zelinsky. New York: Alfred A. Knopf. ISBN 0394968174. OCLC 11397807.
- — (2003). Morris the Artist. Illustrated by Boris Kulikov. New York: Farrar, Straus and Giroux. ISBN 0374350639. OCLC 49616924.
- — (2004). Why Mole Shouted and Other Stories. Illustrated by Sergio Ruzzier. New York: Farrar, Straus and Giroux. ISBN 0374384177. OCLC 50192526.
- — (2005). More Mole Stories and Little Gopher, Too. Illustrated by Sergio Ruzzier. New York: Farrar, Straus and Giroux. ISBN 0374350264. OCLC 54206941.

== Awards ==
- Dorothy & Lewis B. Cullman Center for Scholars Fellowship, 2008
- Pulitzer Prize Finalist (Shakespeare's Kitchen, 2008)
- PEN/ O. Henry Prize Story, ("Making Good," 2008)
- Member, American Academy of Arts and Sciences, 2006
- Best American Short Stories, ("The Reverse Bug,"[1989] )
- The O. Henry Awards Prize Story, ("The Reverse Bug," 1990)
- University of Illinois, Senior University Scholar, 1987–1990
- National Endowment for the Arts, Grant in Fiction, 1987–1988
- American Academy and Institute of Arts and Letters Award, 1986
- Harold U. Ribalow Prize, [1986]
- Carl Sandburg Award for Fiction, 1985
- Artists Grant, The Illinois Arts Council, 1985
- Grawemeyer Award for Faculty, University of Louisville, 1983
- National Endowment for the Humanities, Grant in Translation, 1982
- National Endowment for the Arts, Grant for Fiction, 1972–1973
- Creative Artists Public Service Program of New York State, 1972–1973
- American Library Association Notable Book selection (Tell Me a Mitzi, 1970)
- National Council on the Arts and Humanities Grant, 1967–1968
- Guggenheim Fellowship, 1965–1966
