= The Children Who Cheated the Nazis =

The Children Who Cheated the Nazis is a documentary about the Kindertransport, by the director Sue Read and producer Jim Goulding. This documentary film was broadcast by Channel 4 on 28 September 2000, and has since been broadcast in America, Israel, France, Australia, Spain and worldwide.

The film is narrated by Lord Richard Attenborough, Academy Award-winning film actor and director, who features in the film, talking about the two Kindertransport children his family gave a home to.

Also featured is actor Warren Mitchell, whose family took in a Kindertransport child.

== See also ==
- Into the Arms of Strangers: Stories of the Kindertransport
- The Power of Good: Nicholas Winton
