= Mona Golabek =

American pianist and author (born 1954)

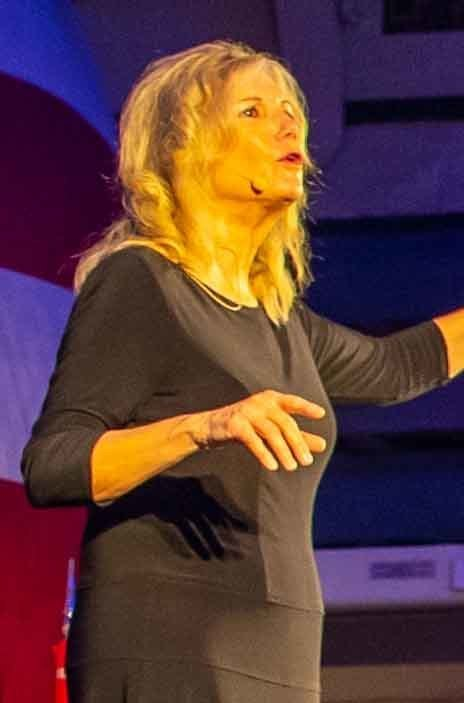
- Golabek in 2023
- Born: June 23, 1954 (age 71); Los Angeles, California
- Occupations: Pianist; author; radio host

Mona Golabek (born June 23, 1954) is an American concert pianist, author, and radio host. She has appeared with many leading orchestras and made numerous recordings. Golabek co-wrote a book entitled The Children of Willesden Lane that chronicles her mother's experience with the Kindertransport which was published in 2002. A play titled The Pianist of Willesden Lane, based on the book, adapted and directed by Hershey Felder, and in which Golabek appeared in a one-woman show, opened at the Geffen Playhouse in Los Angeles in April 2012. The play opened in London at the St James Theatre in January 2016.

== Biography ==
Concert pianist Mona Golabek ( b. June 23, 1954) is the daughter of Lisa Jura, a concert pianist, and French resistance fighter Michel Golabek. Her mother Lisa was born in Austria, and was one of 10,000 Jewish children brought to England before World War II as part of the Kindertransport, a mission to rescue children threatened by the Nazis. Although Mona's mother was rescued, her maternal grandparents were murdered at Auschwitz. Her father, Michel Golabek, received the Croix de Guerre for his heroism in the French Resistance during WW II.

Golabek was born in Los Angeles, California, and was taught piano largely by her mother, who had in turn learned to play from her own mother (Mona's grandmother) Malka Jura. When asked in an interview whether she had had other piano teachers aside from her mother, Mona answered: "I studied with several outstanding pianists: Leon Fleisher, Reginald Stewart, Sergio Calligaris, and Joanna Graudan. But my mother was my true teacher and inspiration".

Mona won the Young Concert Artists International Auditions in 1972, which led to her New York City recital debut at Hunter College. Afterward, she continued to study piano privately in Rome and London. In 1980, she won an Avery Fisher Career Grant.

She has since appeared in concert with major orchestras and conductors around the world and in recitals at the Hollywood Bowl, the Kennedy Center, and the Royal Festival Hall. She has one Grammy nomination and she was the subject of the PBS documentaries More Than the Music, winner of the Grand Prize in the 1985 WorldFest-Houston International Film Festival. Concerto for Mona by William Kraft was dedicated to her.

In 1992 Golabek and her sister Renee Golabek-Kaye, also a pianist, organized a performance and recording of Camille Saint-Saëns's The Carnival of the Animals. The performance included the reading of Ogden Nash's well known verses on animals with Saint-Saëns's music played underneath. The verses were read by 14 well-known actors, including Ted Danson, Audrey Hepburn, James Earl Jones, Walter Matthau, William Shatner, Jaclyn Smith, Lily Tomlin, Betty White, Joan Rivers, Charlton Heston, and Dudley Moore. Proceeds from the recording were given to charities that help animals, such as the American Society for the Prevention of Cruelty to Animals. Mona and Renee also performed as a piano duo on a recording that features Ravel's Mother Goose Suite with narrator, actress Meryl Streep, the Poulenc Two Piano Concerto, and Poulenc's Babar the Elephant, with the New Zealand Symphony Orchestra conducted by JoAnn Falletta.

In 1998, Golabek began hosting her own classical music radio program "The Romantic Hours", produced by former KFAC radio personality Doug Ordunio. The show is a wedding of love letters, romantic poetry and thoughts of writers and thinkers of the world with classical music.

In April 2012, Mona Golabek was featured in a one-woman show, The Pianist of Willesden Lane, directed by Hershey Felder, at the Geffen Playhouse. The play went on to successful theatrical runs in Chicago at the Royal George Theater, in Berkeley at Berkeley Rep, in a return engagement to the Geffen Playhouse and in New York at 59E59 Theaters. In 2016, she made her theatrical debut in London at the St. James Theater. The sold out theatrical run resulted in a return engagement the following year.

In 2003, Mona Golabek founded the Hold on To Your Music non-profit, dedicated to sharing her mother's story with others. The foundation has distributed over 300,000 copies of the book as Golabek has brought the educational mission and Willesden READ - a citywide program including the theatrical show - to students worldwide. Since 2012, the Willesden READ has been implemented in South Africa, London, New York, Chicago, Cleveland, Los Angeles, San Francisco, Memphis, Birmingham, and Portland.

== Book ==
- Mona Golabek and Lee Cohen, The Children of Willesden Lane: Beyond the Kindertransport: A Memoir of Music, Love, and Survival. Grand Central Publishing, 2003. ISBN 978-0446690270.
- A video series, "Teaching the Children of Willesden Lane," sponsored by the Annenberg Foundation has been promoted on-line.

== Awards ==
- 1972: Winner, Young Concert Artists International Auditions
