= The Children of Willesden Lane =

2002 memoir by Mona Golabek

- Author: Mona Golabek; Lee Cohen
- Language: English
- Genre: Memoir
- Publisher: Hachette Book Group
- ISBN: 978-0-446-69027-0

The Children of Willesden Lane is a memoir by Mona Golabek, documenting the life of her mother, Lisa, from the time she left Vienna, Austria to the end of World War II. It has been adapted into a film and an organization formed in honor of the book, that is dedicated to empowering people with the arts.

== Plot ==
Lisa Jura was a prodigy who hoped to become a pianist during pre-World War II Vienna. As Nazi attacks on Jews continue in her home country, her parents send her on the Kindertransport to London, England. Several days after arrival, she became a servant at a manor. Sometime later, though, she leaves the manor. Lisa then resides in a hostel for Jewish children on Willesden Lane, where she makes new friends. Continuing her interest in piano, she plays music, inspiring the other children through their problems. It's a story of kindness and love and compassion.

== Reception ==
Joanna H. Kraus from Common Sense Media rated The Children of Willesden Lane five stars. BookTrust described the book as "eye-opening".

In 2018 the book was translated into Polish and published as Dzieci z Willesden Lane by Wydawnictwo Austeria.

=== Awards ===
The children's edition is a 2018 Sydney Taylor Book Award Notable Book for Older Readers.

=== Adaptations ===
A theater adaptation of the book, The Pianist of Willesden Lane, was adapted and directed by Hershey Felder.

BBC Films and Empire of the Sun producer Robert Shapiro produced a movie version of the book released in 2016.
