= Otto Newman =

Austrian-American sociologist

- Born: 2 July 1922; Vienna, Austria
- Died: 29 November 2015 (aged 93); La Jolla, CA
- Education: University of Oxford, Inter BSc; University of London, BA; London School of Economics, MA, PhD
- Known for: The American Dream in the Information Age (1999); The Promise of the Third Way: Globalization and Social Justice (2001)
- Scientific career
- Fields: Sociology
- Workplaces: San Diego State University; University of California, San Diego; University of Illinois Springfield; London South Bank University; University of Stirling, Scotland

Otto Newman (born Otto Neumann 2 July 1922 – 29 November 2015) was an Austrian-born sociologist who was a professor at Stirling University in Scotland, Chairman of the Sociology Department at South Bank University in London, and adjunct professor at San Diego State University in California. His extensive writings have been published on four continents. His main works include: Gambling: Hazard and Reward (London University Press) and The Challenge of Corporatism (Macmillan). He also authored extensive research reports leading to policy implementation, and books and papers on globalism including, "The Third Way" and "American Declinism".

== History / career ==
=== Escape ===
Otto Neumann was born on 2 July 1922 in Vienna, Austria. At the age of 16, he was able to escape the Anschluss on the final Kindertransport out of Vienna leaving on 13 December 1938, from the Wien Westbahnhof train station.

After arriving in England, he was kept at a Dovercourt holiday camp until arrangements could be made for further care. He was offered a home with an English family, but after taking a placement exam, he was chosen as one of eighteen older children arriving on the Kindertransport to earn a spot at the University of Oxford, studying there for 3 years.

=== Internment / war years ===
At the start of the war in 1939, there were 78,000 refugees in Britain who were considered "enemy aliens," a category that included all peoples living in the UK who were from Germany, Austria or Italy. Jewish people who had emigrated from Germany to escape Hitler's antisemitism were also considered enemy aliens.

Otto was unable to finish studies at Oxford due to his being interned as an enemy alien on the first day of his inter-BSC college exam.

On 2 July 1940, Otto's 18th birthday, he was rounded up and eventually shipped to the Isle of Man. Later, he was transferred to the transit camp at the Lingfield horseracing track.

Otto was due to sail on two different deportation ships, one bound for Australia, and one for North America. Upon arriving at the docks, each time he found that his name had been left off the final boarding lists. Both times the ships were sunk by enemy action. Later, released from internment, he had sponsorship from an American cousin and a visa to travel to America. However, with increased shipping loses, no further passengers were allowed to travel by the time clearance came through.

After being released from internment Otto managed to find work in London and served his duty as a fire watcher during the war. When allowed, Otto volunteered to serve in the RAF, but was rejected when it was learned that his parents were still in Vienna. He then volunteered for factory work and was sent to a place producing pistons for fighter aircraft where he worked for a short time.

At the age of 22, Otto became a professional gambler until the end of the war.

In the final year of hostilities, he reached the final of the British Open Table tennis championship defeating two top-ranked players en route before succumbing to the world champion after a close match. Otto was selected as an inside right for a combined amateur football team in the Alliance League – the best of its type – and succumbed.

=== Business ===
Marrying June Pattenden on 6 June 1946, Otto soon had two children, Paul, born in 1947, and Victoria, in 1948. Otto worked as company secretary for a West End fashion house.

Later, he went into business as a clothing manufacturer under the name of Paul Asker Fashions. The most successful item of manufacture was his introduction of the modern Hoop Skirt in the 1950s, which was designed by his wife.

=== British academia ===
Leaving his successful manufacturing business at the age of 40, Otto Newman returned to academia to complete his studies at the University of London, earning his Diploma in Sociology in 1964. He continued at the London School of Economics earning his BSc (Soc) in 1966 and his PhD in sociology in 1970.

From 1968 to 1971, he was a lecturer in sociology at the University of Stirling, in Scotland.

In 1971 he moved to the Polytechnic of the South Bank in London, where he chaired the department of Social Sciences from 1975 to 1987. He also directed the Lifestyle Research Unit, closely linked to the Greater London Council, co-operating in effecting policies enhancing the prospects for the city's youth. He served on the Executive of the British Sociological Association for a number of years, chairing the Publications Committee, editing the Sociology in Practice series and actively involved in the Sociology editorial board.

=== United States ===
From 1981 through 1982, Otto accepted a visiting lecturer position at Sangamon State University, later called the University of Illinois Springfield, then returned to South Bank University. Moving to California in 1987 he accepted a position at San Diego State University. He was also a visiting scholar at the University of California, San Diego from 1987 to 1990. In 2008 he finished writing his memoirs in a self-published work called "Escapes and Adventures: A 20th Century Odyssey."

He died on 29 November 2015 at the age of 93.

== Qualifications ==
Inter BSc (Math/Eng), University of Oxford, 1940
DipSoc (double distinction), University of London, 1964
BSc (Soc), London School of Economics, University of London, 1966
PhD (Soc), London School of Economics, University of London, 1970

== Professional appointments ==
1987– Professor/Adjunct Professor, San Diego State University
1987–1990 Visiting Scholar, University of California, San Diego

1971–1987 South Bank University, London:
1971–1974 Principal Lecturer
1974–1986 Chair, Department of Social Sciences
(1986 Faculty: 32 tenured, 18 part-time, 11 Research Fellows/Assistants)
1984–1987 Director, Lifestyle Research Unit, South Bank University, London

1981–1982 Visiting professor, University of Illinois Springfield
1968–1971 Lecturer, Sociology, University of Stirling, Scotland
1950–1964 managing director, Commerce and Industry
1945–1950 company secretary

== Research activity ==
Gambling: Social Issues and Motivations
Corporatism
Unemployed Youth
Leisure studies and Lifestyle Enhancement
Community Motivators
Football hooliganism
Politics of Unreason
American exceptionalism
Affluence and Post-Scarcity Society
Communitarianism
The Future of the American Dream
The Promise of the Third Way
Soft power
Globalization, Terrorism and Human rights

== Professional academic appointments ==
Council for National Academic Awards, London, 1973–1983:
Sociological Studies Board
National Visiting and Award Boards
National Advisory Boards

South Bank University, 1971–1987:
Academic Board
Faculty Board
Higher Degree Committee; Vice-chair
Planning and Resource Board; Vice-chair
Degree Validation Board
Faculty Appointment Board

National Gambling Board, London, 1973–1980

British Sociological Association:
Publications Committee; Chair 1975–1980
National Executive Board; 1976–1984
Coordinating Committee; 1979–1980
Sociology, Journal of the British Sociological Association: Editorial Board, 1976–1980
Sociology in Practice, Series Editor, Croom Helm, 1981–1984

Greater London Council:
Consultant: Arts & Recreation, 1983–1986
Industrial Enterprise Board, 1984–1986
Steering Committee, Arts & Recreation, 1983–1986
Sports Committee, Arts & Recreation, 1985–1986

== Publications ==
Gambling: Hazard and Reward (1972). London: University of London Press.
The Challenge of Corporatism(1981). New Studies in Sociology. London: Macmillan.
Escapes and Adventures: A 20th Century Odyssey. Lulu Press, 2008

With Richard DeZoysa:
The American Dream in the Information Age (1999). UK: Macmillan US: St. Martin's Press.
The Promise of the Third Way (2001). UK: Palgrave; US: St. Martin's Press.
The American Dream in the Information Age (2002). Mandarin edition. Beijing, China: Social Sciences Documentation Publishing House.
Towards Progress and Peace: Globalization, Terrorism and Human Rights (2005). Bloomington, Ind: Author House.

== Journals and research reports ==
- "Family Planning: Past and Present"; Sociological Society, March 1965
- "Elites and Society"; Sociological Society, June 1965
- "Sociology of the Betting Shop"; British Journal of Sociology, 19(1), March 1968
- "The Gambling Problem"; Social Service Quarterly, Summer 1972
- "The Sociology of Social Problems"; Canadian Review of Sociology and Anthropology, 12(4), 1976
- "Leisure and Life Styles"; Ontario Psychologist, 8(2), 1976
- "The Educator's Dilemma"; British Journal of Educational Studies, 25(1), 1977
- "The Newly Acquisitive Affluent Worker"; Sociology, 13(1), 1979
- "Education for Social Dominance and Control"; New Education, 2(1), 1980
- "Class Matters", Sociology, 14(1), 1980
- "Corporatism, Leisure and Collective Control"; Centre for Work And Leisure Studies, Salford University, 1981
- "Leisure Counselling Today"; World Congress of Sociology, Mexico City, 1982
- "Leisure Counselling"; Centre for Work and Leisure Studies, Salford University, 1982
- "The Coming of a Leisure Society?"; Leisure Studies, 2(1) 1983
- "Leisure and Social Change"; Education and Society, 1(1), 1983
- "Lifestyle Enhancement for the Young Unemployed"; Report No1 Greater London Council, 1983
- "Training for the Young Unemployed"; Industrial Enterprise Board, 1983
- "Community Activator: a Case for Action"; Greater London Council, 1984
- "The Learning of Lifestyle Enhancement"; Inner London Education Authority, 1984
- "From Employment to Work"; Industrial Enterprise Board, 1984
- "Proactivism: The Answer to Youth Unemployment?"; Greater London Council, 1985
- "The Causes of Unemployment"; Greater London Council, 1985
- "Unemployment, Work and the New Post- Industrialism"; European Foundation for the Improvement of Living and Working Conditions, 1985
- "Soccer Violence: Initial Observations"; Greater London Council, 1985
- "Hooligans At Home and Abroad"; Greater London Council, 1985
- "Youth since Industrialisation"; Greater London Council, 1985
- "Soccer: A Brief Social History"; Greater London Council, 1986
- "Recreation and Lifestyle for the Young Unemployed"; Greater London Council, 1986, Summary Report No2 (with Maureen Farish and Peter Miller)
- "Policies for the Lost Generation"; Greater London Council, 1986, Summary Report No3 (assisted by Maureen Farish and Peter Miller)
- "Why Us: From Paragons to Pariahs"; London Residuary Authority, 1986
- "Don't Be A Jerk"; London Residuary Authority, 1986
- "White Collar Hooliganism"; London Residuary Authority, 1986
- "The Brixton Recreation Centre: Analysis of a Political Institution"; London Residuary Authority, 1986 (with Karl Murray)

With Richard DeZoysa:

- "American Exceptionalism: Against the Tide Again?"; South Bank University, Occasional Papers No 2, 1993
- American Policy Choices for a New Era; Contemporary Politics, 1(3), 1995
- "The Underclass, Welfare and Joblessness"; California Sociological Association, 1995
- "The Republican Vision"; The Discoursi, Sundsvall: Sweden, 1996
- "Prospects for a Revitalised Community"; Contemporary Politics, 2(4), 1996
- "Virtues, Values and Identity"; The Americana, Spring 1997
- "Food: Feast of Famine"; The Americana, Summer 1997
- "The New World Order: Then and Now"; The Americana, Fall 1997
- "Perspectives on Civic Society: the Prospect"; DMI Rapport, No 2 Demokratiinstitutet,: Sweden
- "Communitarianism- a New Panacea?"; Sociological Perspectives, 40(4), 1997
- "Exploring the Idea of A Third Way: A New Agenda for The Global Era"; The Discoursi, Sundsvall: Sweden Winter 2000
- "The Third Way Alternative: America's New Political Agenda"; Contemporary Sociology Winter 6(3) Winter 2000
- "Globalization, Soft Power and the Challenge of Hollywood"; Contemporary Politics, 8(3) June 2002
- "American Declinism and the Third Way Option"; 2(2) June 2007

== Holocaust testimony ==
Otto Newman's video testimony is located in the library collections of:

- Simon Wiesenthal Center, Los Angeles
- United States Holocaust Memorial Museum, Washington, D.C.
- Holocaust Museum Houston
- Montreal Holocaust Memorial Centre
- Imperial War Museum, London, UK.
- Yad Vashem, Israel
