= Hedy Epstein =

American political activist(1924 - 2016)

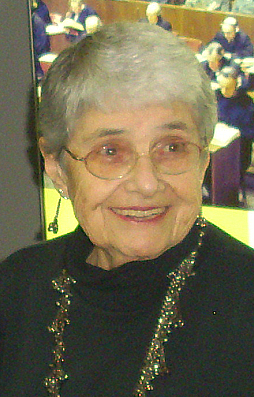
- Hedy Wachenheimer Epstein in 2010
- Born: Hedy Wachenheimer; August 15, 1924; Freiburg im Breisgau, Germany
- Died: May 26, 2016 (aged 91); St. Louis, Missouri, U.S.
- Occupation: Activist
- Website: Hedy Epstein's personal website

Hedy Epstein (née Wachenheimer; August 15, 1924 – May 26, 2016) was a German-born Jewish-American political activist and Holocaust survivor known for her support of the Palestinian cause through the International Solidarity Movement.

Born in Freiburg to a Jewish family, she was rescued from Nazi Germany by the Kindertransport in 1939. She immigrated to the United States in 1948, married Arnold Epstein (?–1977), and lived in St. Louis, Missouri, for many years.

== Biography ==
Hedy Wachenheimer was born to a German-Jewish family in Freiburg, and in 1939 fled Nazi persecution via the Kindertransport to England. All but two of her family were killed at Auschwitz concentration camp during the Holocaust. During World War II she worked in munitions factories and joined a group of left-wing German Jewish refugees who hoped to re-introduce democracy in their homeland – "the foundation of my political education which still stands me in good stead today," she said. Some 60 years later, she was interviewed about this experience for the film Into the Arms of Strangers: Stories of the Kindertransport.

After the war, Epstein worked with the Allied occupying forces in Germany, including working on the Doctors' trial at Nuremberg. In 1948 she immigrated to New York City, then moved to Minneapolis, and then to St. Louis, Missouri. There, she took up activism for affordable housing, the pro-choice movement, and the antiwar movement.

In 1982, in response to news reports of massacres committed by a Lebanese Phalangist militia during the 1982 Lebanon War, Epstein developed a different perspective on the Arab–Israeli conflict; she began to express opposition to Israel's military policies.

In 2001, she founded a St. Louis chapter of the Women in Black, an anti-war group that originally focused on Israel's occupation. She also co-founded the St. Louis Palestine Solidarity Committee and the St. Louis chapter of Jewish Voice for Peace. In 2003 she traveled to the West Bank to work with the International Solidarity Movement. She returned once a year, saying that she had been strip searched and cavity searched in 2004 by guards at Ben Gurion International Airport.

== 2004 speaking tour ==
Epstein spoke about the situation in the occupied territories, and about her own life and experiences, for audiences in the United States. Prior to a talk at Stanford University on October 20, 2004, fliers promoting her presentation "juxtaposed an image of Jews in Nazi Germany with an image of Palestinians at Israeli checkpoints", according to a news article in The Stanford Daily. After an "appalled" reaction from members of Stanford's Jewish community, event organizers stated that no "direct comparison" was intended by the posters, or would be heard in Epstein's remarks. Epstein echoed these sentiments, avoided comparisons between Nazis and Israelis, and spent little time discussing her background in Nazi Germany, wrote The Daily. However, throughout the speech, audience members, many associated with off-campus Jewish organizations, interrupted her talk with shouts of outrage, and extra campus security quietly moved in.

Reactions to the talk were sharply divided. Adina Danzig, president of Stanford's Hillel organization called the lecture "an abuse of history" and hoped that "this event and the isolated interruptions by a few individuals were an aberration". While acknowledging Epstein's general statement about avoiding comparison, Danzig stated that the "disclaimer did not undo the damage" and that "[Epstein] made several remarks drawing the [Israeli–Nazi] parallel".

Nathan Mintz, vice-president of the Stanford Israel Alliance, condemned "Epstein's rhetoric of drawing comparisons of the initial stages of the Holocaust to the current situation in Gaza and the West Bank" as "outright demonization of Jews" representing "only one piece of what is a much larger trend of anti-Semitism on college campuses today." He added that Epstein's ISM colleagues have "direct ties to terrorist organizations" and that the "atmosphere currently on campuses is not one in which a constructive dialogue about the conflict can legitimately take place."

In contrast, a supporter of Epstein condemned these as "misrepresentations and false charges", citing off-campus activists who, "with the intention of disrupting the event", handed out fliers "demonizing" Epstein and "frequently yelled at and interrupted" her. "At one point, he wrote a man suddenly jumped up while Epstein was talking and recited what appeared to be a prepared statement informing her of pending legal actions against her." He asked why Mintz "failed to mention any of the egregious events" of this sort and "submitted his op-ed before actually seeing the event."

In response to controversy over the paper's initial coverage of the story, reader editor Jennifer Graham of the Stanford Daily acknowledged that "plenty – if not unfairly too much" coverage was given to the claims of Epstein's critics. She also apologized for the "wrong" and "misleading" decision to run Mintz's op-ed criticizing Epstein's speech before it had happened. "There are claims, that I can neither confirm nor deny, that Mintz's column factually misrepresents the substance of Epstein's speech", she wrote.

As a "constructive response" to Epstein's presentation, members of several campus Jewish organizations invited Harvard professor Ruth Wisse to speak at Stanford. "While her audience ate Challah bread and drank champagne for the Kiddush", wrote The Stanford Daily, Wisse placed sole blame for Palestinian suffering on the Arab world and on Palestinian politics, and argued that since opposition to the Jews was the only thing that the Arab world had in common, the center of Arab politics became antisemitism. Stanford student Ahmed Ashraf responded with an op-ed contrasting the "pro-Israelis (sic) outraged by Epstein's support for the Palestinians" to the "perfectly respectful" behavior of Arab and Muslim attendees to Wisse's talk, "even as the acidic torrent of hate rained down on them."

An Anti-Defamation League report from the next year characterized Epstein's talk as an "example of anti-Israel campus activism" which "would meet both the United States government's and [Israeli cabinet] Minister Nathan Sharansky's definitions of anti-Semitism," for "comparing Nazi treatment of Jews to Israeli treatment of Palestinians."

An online publication of the Jerusalem Center for Public Affairs cited Epstein's talk on the same subject at the University of California, Santa Cruz among "activities that spill over into various forms of hate-speech demonizing both Israelis and Jews" [which] "compared Israel to a Nazi state and Israeli soldiers to Nazis."

In 2008, the Missouri regional director for the Anti-Defamation League noted, "For someone like Hedy, who came out of the Jewish community at a very difficult time, to criticize Israel ... well, it's difficult. Some people perceive it as disloyal."

== Activism ==
In August 2008, Epstein planned to be on board the Free Gaza Movement's ship attempting to break Israel's naval blockade of Gaza, but had to cancel due to poor health.

In 2009, Epstein participated in the Gaza Freedom March, an international nonviolent protest seeking to challenge Israel’s blockade of Gaza and draw attention to the humanitarian impact of the 2008–2009 Gaza war. She traveled to Egypt with other activists, advocated for the opening of the Rafah crossing, and undertook a hunger strike in Cairo to protest restrictions preventing the march from entering Gaza.

In 2010, she embarked on one of the ships that intended to deliver humanitarian aid to Gaza, but decided in Cyprus not to take part in the trip. She reportedly had also planned to take part in the 2011 flotilla but did not. She was on board "The Audacity of Hope" ready to join the flotilla. However, they were intercepted by the Greek Coast Guard and turned back.

Epstein was supportive of the Black Lives Matter movement, and was arrested for failure to disperse on August 18, 2014, during a St. Louis protest against the killing of Michael Brown and subsequent police actions.

== Death ==
Epstein died at her home in St. Louis on May 26, 2016, aged 91, of cancer. Hedy was survived by son Howard Epstein, and granddaughters Courtney and Kelly.

== See also ==
- Holocaust survivors and descendants supporting Palestine
- List of peace activists
- Israeli–Palestinian conflict
- Norman Finkelstein
