= Into the Arms of Strangers: Stories of the Kindertransport =

2000 documentary film by Mark Jonathan Harris

- Theatrical release poster
- Directed by: Mark Jonathan Harris
- Written by: Mark Jonathan Harris
- Produced by: Deborah Oppenheimer
- Narrated by: Judi Dench
- Edited by: Kate Amend
- Music by: Lee Holdridge
- Production companies: Sabine Films; United States Holocaust Memorial Museum
- Distributed by: Warner Bros. Pictures
- Release dates: September 7, 2000 (United States); November 24, 2000 (United Kingdom)
- Running time: 122 minutes
- Countries: United Kingdom; United States
- Language: English

Into the Arms of Strangers: Stories of the Kindertransport is a 2000 documentary film about the British rescue operation known as the Kindertransport, which saved the lives of over 9,000 Jewish and other children from Nazi Germany, Austria, Czechoslovakia, and Danzig by transporting them via train, boat, and plane to Great Britain. These children, or Kinder in German, were taken into foster homes and hostels in Britain, expecting eventually to be reunited with their parents. The majority of them never saw their families again. Written and directed by Mark Jonathan Harris, produced by Deborah Oppenheimer, narrated by Judi Dench, and made with the cooperation of the United States Holocaust Memorial Museum, it utilized rare and extensive footage, photographs, and artifacts, and is told in the words of the child survivors, rescuers, parents, and foster parents.

The film received numerous accolades, including winning the Academy Award for Best Documentary Feature.

The film was released on DVD and VHS on August 28, 2001, by Warner Home Video.

In 2014, the film was selected for preservation in the United States National Film Registry by the Library of Congress as being "culturally, historically, or aesthetically significant".

== Interviewed subjects ==
The documentary features filmed interviews in which the children of the Kindertransport (aged in their 60s and 70s at the time of the filming) recall their feelings and experiences. These interview subjects include:

- Lorraine Allard, Kind
- Lory Cahn, Kind
- Mariam Cohen, foster mother of Kurt Fuchel
- Hedy Epstein, Kind
- Kurt Fuchel, Kind
- Abrascha Gorbulski, Alexander Gordon, Kind, Dunera Boy, British Army Sergeant (1941-1948)
- Franzi Groszmann, mother of Lore Segal
- Eva Hayman, Kind
- Jack Hellman, Kind
- Bertha Leverton, Kind
- Ursula Rosenfeld, Kind
- Inge Sadan, Kind (Bertha Leverton's sister)
- Lore Segal, Kind
- Robert Sugar, Kind
- Nicholas Winton, rescuer
- Norbert Wollheim, rescuer

Alexander Gordon was also one of the refugees on HMT Dunera, one of the most notorious events of British maritime history.

== Reactions ==
Into the Arms of Strangers: Stories of the Kindertransport has an approval rating of 92% on review aggregator website Rotten Tomatoes, based on 36 reviews, and an average rating of 7.68/10. The website's critical consensus states, "Although it appears to be nothing more than a "talking heads" documentary you may see on TV, Into the Arms of Strangers, nonetheless, tells a heart-wrenching story". Metacritic assigned the film a weighted average score of 79 out of 100, based on 25 critics, indicating "generally favorable" reviews. The film had a limited theatrical release (18 theaters at its widest) and grossed $382,807 domestically.

In 2014, Into the Arms of Strangers: Stories of the Kindertransport was deemed "culturally, historically, or aesthetically significant" by the Library of Congress and selected for preservation for all time in the National Film Registry.

In 2001, Into the Arms of Strangers: Stories of the Kindertransport won the Evening Standard Award for Best Documentary.

== See also ==
- The Children Who Cheated the Nazis
- The Power of Good: Nicholas Winton
- List of Holocaust films
