= Deborah Oppenheimer =

American film and television producer

Deborah Oppenheimer is an American film and television producer. She won an Academy Award in 2001 for best documentary feature for producing Into the Arms of Strangers: Stories of the Kindertransport (2000). The film was narrated by Judi Dench and made with the official cooperation of the United States Holocaust Memorial Museum. Oppenheimer co-authored the companion book to the film with Mark Jonathan Harris and also produced the film's soundtrack.

In 2014, the film was selected for preservation in the United States National Film Registry by the Library of Congress as being "culturally, historically, or aesthetically significant."

In 2001, Into the Arms of Strangers: Stories of the Kindertransport won the Evening Standard Award for Best Documentary.

Her HBO feature-length documentary, FOSTER (2019), which examined the foster care system in Los Angeles, received the National Council for Adoption's "Excellence in Foster Care Media Award" in November 2019.

The film was nominated for Best Documentary Screenplay by the Writers Guild of America.

== Biography ==
Deborah Oppenheimer was raised in Valley Stream, New York. After graduating from Valley Stream South High School, she matriculated to Buffalo State University where she graduated magna cum laude with a degree in English secondary education.

She started as an editor for John Wiley & Sons before moving into television at Lorimar Productions in 1981. While at Lorimar, Oppenheimer was associate producer for the Cable ACE Award-winning production of the Showtime / PBS drama Master Harold...and the Boys.

As president of Mohawk Productions at Warner Bros. from 1996 to 2010, Oppenheimer executive produced all of the company's television shows and oversaw day-to-day operations. After leaving Mohawk, she was named executive vice-president of NBC Universal International TV Production in September 2010.

As Executive Vice President of Carnival Films, Oppenheimer developed and executive produced the television series from Christopher Guest, Family Tree for HBO and BBC1. She later conceived and led U.S. strategies as a production consultant to the Carnival Films television series, Downton Abbey.

In December 2012, she was selected to be a member of the United States Holocaust Memorial Council by US President Barack Obama.

== Awards and recognition ==
Year	Award	Category	Nominated work	Result	Notes
2000	Heartland Film Festival	Crystal Heart Award	Into the Arms of Strangers: Stories of the Kindertransport	Won	Shared with Mark Jonathan Harris
2000	International Documentary Association	Video Source Award	Into the Arms of Strangers: Stories of the Kindertransport	Nominated	Shared with Mark Jonathan Harris
2001	Academy Award	Best Documentary, Feature	Into the Arms of Strangers: Stories of the Kindertransport	Won	Shared with Mark Jonathan Harris
2001	Evening Standard British Film Awards	Best Documentary, Feature	Into the Arms of Strangers: Stories of the Kindertransport	Won	Shared with Mark Jonathan Harris
2001	Long Island International Film Expo	Filmmaker Achievement Award	Into the Arms of Strangers: Stories of the Kindertransport	Won	
