= Mark Jonathan Harris =

American documentary filmmaker (born 1941)

Mark Jonathan Harris (born October 28, 1941) is an American documentary filmmaker, writer, and educator known for his award-winning work in the documentary genre. Over the course of his career, Harris has earned three Academy Awards and numerous accolades for his contributions to filmmaking and education. He served as a distinguished professor and head of advanced documentary production at the USC School of Cinematic Arts, where he taught from 1983 until his retirement in 2023. Harris is also an accomplished author, having written five children's novels and a collection of short stories.

== Early life and education ==
Mark Jonathan Harris was born on October 28, 1941, in Scranton, Pennsylvania. He attended Harvard University, where he completed his education before pursuing a career in documentary film making.

== Career in filmmaking ==
Harris began his career in documentary filmmaking in the late 1960s. His first major success came with Huelga! (1967), a documentary about Cesar Chavez and the groundbreaking farmworkers strike in Delano, California. He followed this with The Redwoods (1968), a film he wrote and co-produced for the Sierra Club to help establish a Redwoods National Park and which won an Academy Award for Best Short Documentary. He gained international recognition for The Long Way Home (1997), a feature-length documentary on the aftermath of the Holocaust, which won the Academy Award for Best Feature Documentary.

In 2000, Harris wrote and directed Into the Arms of Strangers: Stories of the Kindertransport, a documentary chronicling the British rescue mission that saved 10,000 Jewish children during World War II. The film received critical acclaim and won the Academy Award for Best Feature Documentary. It was later selected by the U.S. Library of Congress for permanent preservation in the National Film Registry.

Harris continued to focus on socially and politically significant issues in his work. He co-wrote and co-directed Breaking Point: The War for Democracy in Ukraine (2016), a film about the Ukrainian fight for independence, which garnered multiple awards at international film festivals. His HBO documentary Foster (2019), which examined the foster care system in Los Angeles, was nominated for Best Documentary Screenplay by the Writers Guild of America.

=== Recent projects ===
In recent years, Harris has returned to making films centered on contemporary social and political issues. His projects include Darfur Now (2007), a documentary about the Darfur genocide, which received the NAACP Image Award, and Living in Emergency: Stories of Doctors Without Borders (2008), which focuses on the medical humanitarian organization and was shortlisted for the Oscar for Best Feature Documentary. Women of the Gulag (2018), a film he executive produced, was also shortlisted by the Academy for Best Short Documentary. Harris also served as Consulting Producer for the PBS series Asian Americans (2021), which won a Peabody Award.

=== Literary work ===
Harris has written five children's novels, which have won numerous awards, including the FOCAL Award for best children’s book about California for Come the Morning (1989). He is also co-author of the book version of Into the Arms of Strangers. In addition to his work in children's literature, Harris has published short stories and articles in various national newspapers and magazines. His most recent literary work, Misfits, a collection of short stories, was published in 2023 and was an Editor’s Choice of Publishers Weekly BookLife.

=== Academic career ===
Harris was a faculty member at the USC School of Cinematic Arts for 40 years, teaching courses in documentary filmmaking and screenwriting. From 2012 to 2023, he also served as co-principal investigator of the American Film Showcase, the flagship film and TV diplomacy program of the U.S State Department. In 2023, he was named Emeritus Distinguished Professor in recognition of his contributions to the university.

== Selected filmography ==
- The Redwoods (1968) – Writer, co-producer.
- The Long Way Home (1997) – Writer, director.
- Into the Arms of Strangers: Stories of the Kindertransport (2000) – Writer, director.
- The Defector (2008) – Director.
- Breaking Point: The War for Democracy in Ukraine (2016) – Co-writer, co-director
- Foster (2019) – Writer, director
- Darfur Now (2007) – Producer
- Living in Emergency: Stories of Doctors Without Borders (2008) – Executive Producer
- Women of the Gulag (2018) – Executive Producer

== Awards and honors ==
1. Academy Award for Best Short Documentary for The Redwoods (1968).
2. Academy Award for Best Feature Documentary for The Long Way Home (1997).
3. Academy Award for Best Feature Documentary for Into the Arms of Strangers: Stories of the Kindertransport (2000).
4. Emmy nomination for Outstanding Writing for Nonfiction Programming for Unchained Memories: Readings from the Slave Narratives (2003).
5. Scholarship and Preservation Award of the International Documentary Association (2010).
6. Writers Guild of America Nomination for Best Documentary Screenplay for Foster (2019).
7. USC Associates Award for Artistic Excellence (2021)
8. Peabody Award for Asian Americans (2021).

== Jury Festivals ==
1. Student Academy Awards
2. Palm Springs International Film Festival
3. Regina International Film Festival
