= Moshe Zimmermann =

Israeli historian and writer (born 1943)

- משה צימרמן
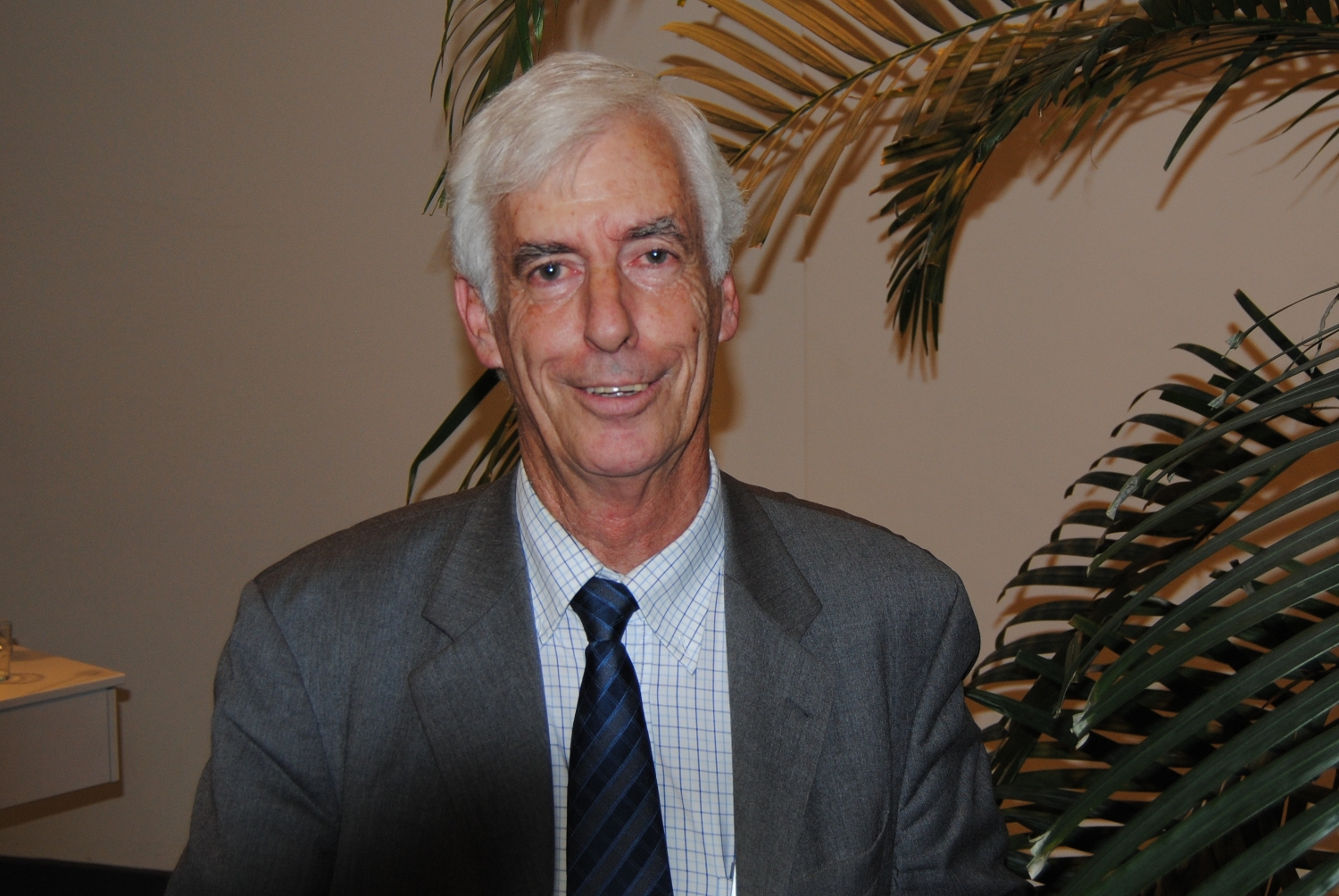
- Moshe Zimmermann (2010).
- Born: 25 December 1943 (age 82); Jerusalem, Mandatory Palestine
- Scientific career
- Fields: History
- Institutions: Hebrew University of Jerusalem

Moshe Zimmermann (Hebrew: משה צימרמן; born 25 December 1943) is an Israeli historian and writer. He is a professor emeritus at the Hebrew University of Jerusalem. From 1986 to 2012 he was the director of the Richard Koebner Minerva Center for German History.

== Biography ==
Moshe Zimmerman was born in Jerusalem.

== Academic career ==
Zimmermann received his undergraduate, graduate and doctorate in history at the Hebrew University of Jerusalem where he also currently works. His academic research focuses on the social history of Germany in the 18th and 20th centuries, as well as the history of German Jews and antisemitism.

In 2015 he was interviewed and filmed for the documentary The Essential Link: The Story of Wilfrid Israel by Yonatan Nir, in which he offered more angles to explain why Wilfrid Israel's story did not receive the expected public attention.

== Lawsuits ==
Zimmermann was taken to court several times and cited for defamation in the wake of comments he made in 1995 regarding comparisons that he thought might be drawn between settlers in Hebron and Nazi youth, in the wake of Baruch Goldstein's Cave of the Patriarchs Massacre. The lawsuits against him were all dismissed. In 2002, Zimmermann sued Haaretz for libel after it published an unflattering mention in an article authored by a former student, who claimed Zimmermann drew comparisons between Israel and Nazism while being supported financially by Germany. In 2004, the lawsuit was, however, dismissed, with Zimmermann having been admonished by the judge for making controversial analogies and yet, at the same time, not accepting criticism of his views. Zimmermann later expressed regret for the lawsuit.

== Awards and recognition ==
He was honoured with the Humboldt Prize in 1993, and the Jacob and Wilhelm Grimm Prize from the German Academic Exchange Service in 1997. He received Dr. Leopold Lucas Prize from the University of Tübingen in 2002, and was awarded the 2006 Theodor Lessing Prize for Criticism.

== Published works ==
- German Past – Israeli Memory. Tel Aviv 2002.
- Wilhelm Marr – The Patriarch of Antisemitism, New York, Oxford UP, 1986.
- Wilhelm Marr – The Patriarch of Antisemitism, Jerusalem, Shazar, 1982. (Hebr.)
- Deutsch-jüdische Vergangenheit: Der Judenhass als Herausforderung. Paderborn 2005.
- Goliaths Falle. Israelis und Palästinenser im Würgegriff 2004
- Wende in Israel. Zwischen Nation und Religion. 1996, ISBN 3-7466-8501-X
- Die deutschen Juden 1914–1945. 1997, ISBN 3-486-55082-9
- Hamburgischer Patriotismus und deutscher Nationalismus. Die Emanzipation der Juden in Hamburg 1830–1865, Hamburg, Hans Christians, 1979.
- Deutsche gegen Deutsche. Das Schicksal der Juden 1938–1945. Berlin 2008.
- Die Angst vor dem Frieden. Das israelische Dilemma. Berlin 2010.
