= Frank Foley =

British intelligence officer (1884–1958)

Frank Foley CMG
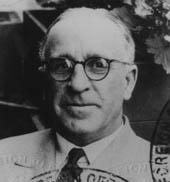
- Born: Francis Edward Foley; 24 November 1884; Highbridge, Somerset, England
- Died: 8 May 1958 (aged 73); Stourbridge, Worcestershire (now West Midlands), England
- Employer: Government
- Spouse: Katharine Eva (m. 1921)

Major Francis Edward Foley CMG (24 November 1884 – 8 May 1958) was a British Secret Intelligence Service officer. As a passport control officer for the British Embassy in Berlin, Foley "bent the rules" and helped thousands of Jewish families escape from Nazi Germany after Kristallnacht and before the outbreak of the Second World War. He is officially recognised as a British Hero of the Holocaust and as a Righteous Among the Nations.

== Early life ==
Foley was the third son of Isabella and Andrew Wood Foley, a Tiverton-born railway worker, whose family may have originated from Roscommon in Ireland in the early 1800s. After attending local schools in Somerset, Foley won a scholarship to Stonyhurst College, Lancashire, where he was educated by the Jesuits. He then went to a Catholic seminary in France to train as a priest but transferred to the Université de France in Poitiers to study Classics. While there he reconsidered his vocation for the priesthood and decided instead to pursue an academic career. He travelled extensively in Europe, becoming fluent in both French and German.

Foley graduated from the Royal Military College, Sandhurst, and was commissioned as a second lieutenant into the Hertfordshire Regiment on 25 January 1917. He was appointed temporary captain on 20 September 1917, while commanding an infantry company of the 1st Battalion, Hertfordshire Regiment, and was later with the 2nd/6th Battalion, North Staffordshire Regiment, during which time he was mentioned in despatches.

== Joining secret service ==
The story of Foley's escape from Germany and his language skills had been noted at the War Office. He was encouraged to apply for the Intelligence Corps. On 25 July 1918, Foley was promoted to lieutenant. In July 1918 he became part of a small unit that was responsible for recruiting and running networks of secret agents in France, Belgium, and the Netherlands. After the Armistice he served for a short time in the Inter-Allied Military Commission of Control in Cologne. On 19 April 1920 he relinquished the temporary rank of captain, and in December 1921 retired from the Army with the rank of captain.

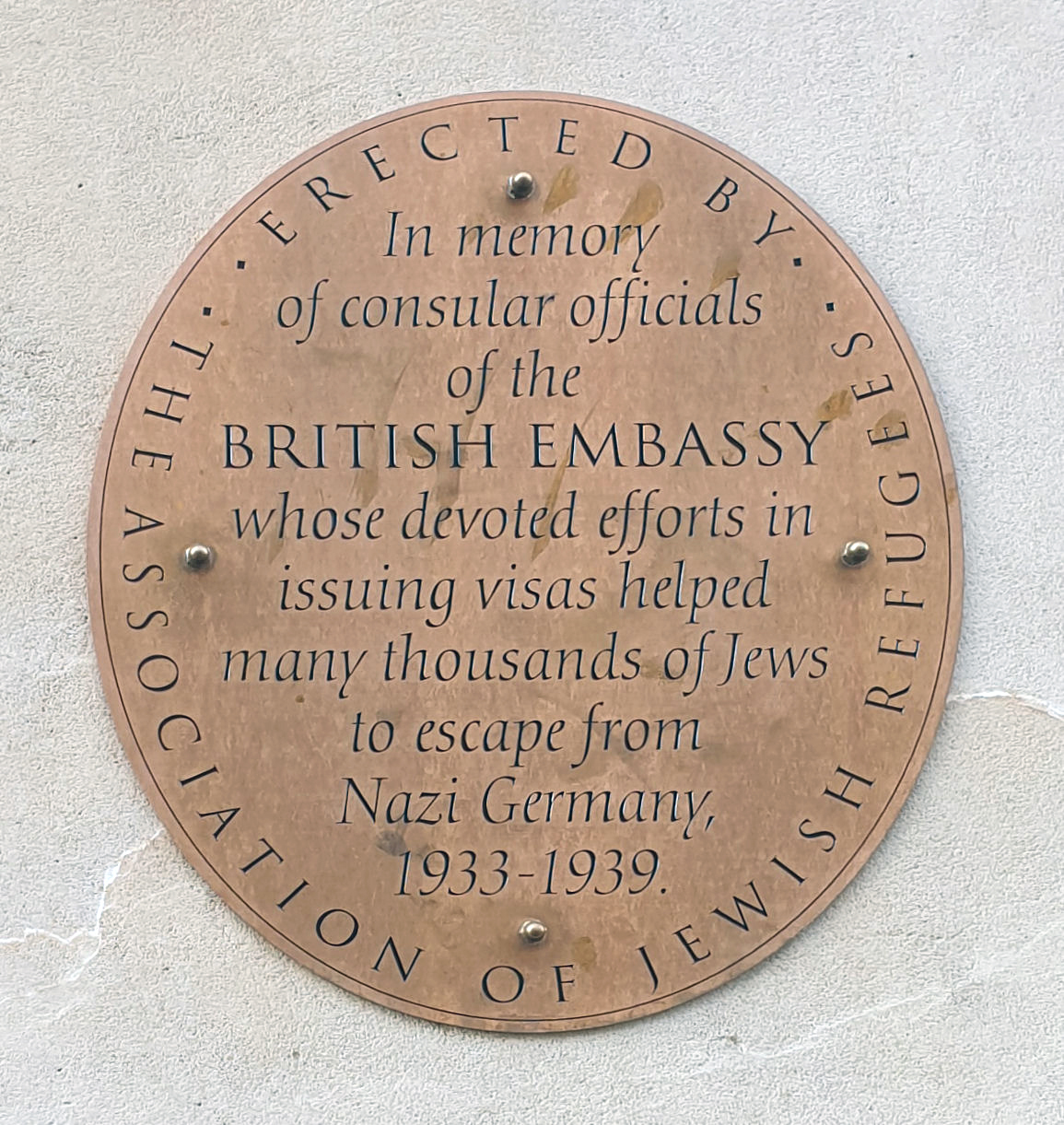
Plaque at the Embassy of the United Kingdom, Berlin, unveiled in 2020 by the Association of Jewish Refugees to honour the consular officials at the embassy

After the running down of the commission, he was offered the post of passport control officer in Berlin which was a cover for his main duties as head of the British Secret Intelligence Service (MI6) station. During the 1920s and '30s, Foley recruited agents and acquired key details of German military research and development.

Together with Wilfrid Israel and Hubert Pollack, Foley formed a special mechanism that specialized in rescuing Jews who were already taken into the first Nazi concentration camps. Pollack had contacts in the Gestapo; Wilfrid had money and direct links with sponsors abroad; and Foley was the man in charge of issuing visas. People came to Israel pleading for his help in releasing their relations from the camps; he gave the necessary funds to Pollack; Pollack obtained the documents; and Foley granted visas to those who Israel and Pollack told him were honest people whose names had been blackened by the Gestapo. Pollack and Israel kept Foley informed of any agents planted by the Gestapo among the visa applicants. This story is reflected among others in the film The Essential Link: The Story of Wilfrid Israel by filmmaker Yonatan Nir.

Foley is primarily remembered as a "British Schindler". In his role as passport control officer, he helped thousands of Jews escape from Nazi Germany. At the 1961 trial of Adolf Eichmann, he was described as a "Scarlet Pimpernel" for the way he risked his own life to save Jews threatened with death by the Nazis. Despite having no diplomatic immunity and being liable to arrest at any time, Foley would bend the rules when stamping passports and issuing visas, to allow Jews to escape "legally" to Britain or Mandatory Palestine, which was controlled by the British. Sometimes he went further, going into internment camps to get Jews out, hiding them in his home, and helping them get forged passports. One Jewish aid worker estimated that he saved "tens of thousands" of people from the Holocaust.

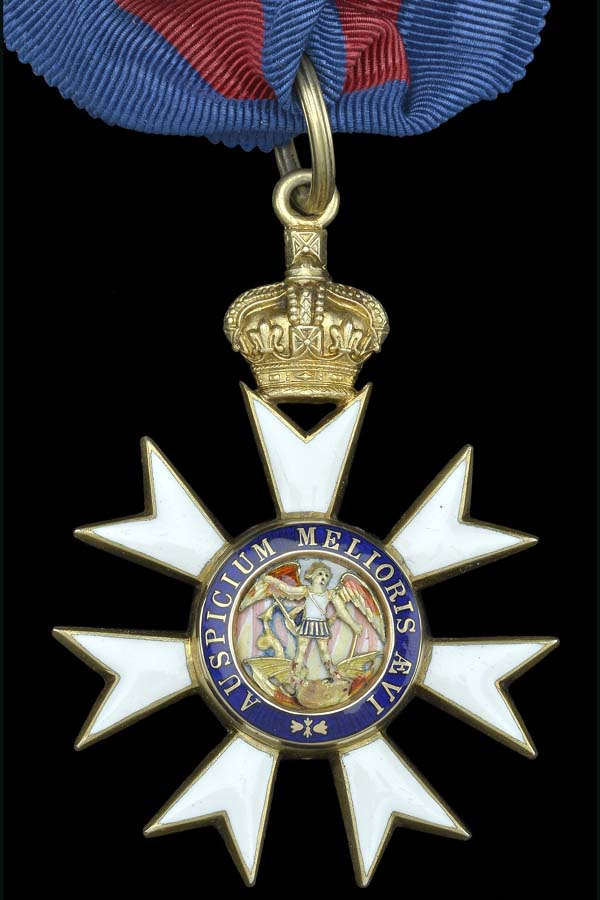
CMG award

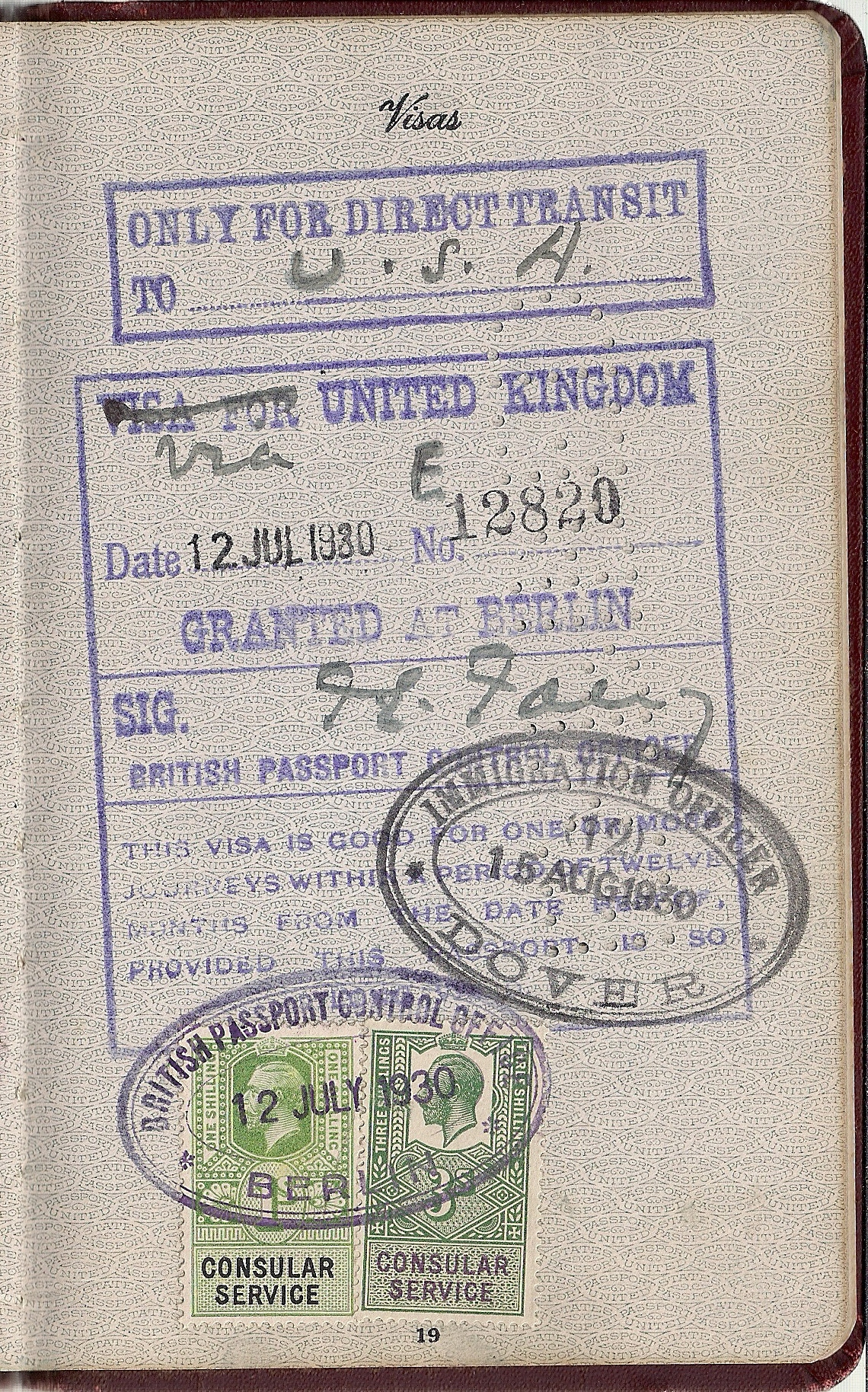
Frank Foley signed visa from Berlin

== Second World War ==
In 1939 and 1940, Foley was a passport control officer in Norway until the Germans invaded, when he was attached to Otto Ruge, C-in-C Norwegian Forces in the Field, for which services he received the Norwegian Knight's Cross of the Order of St Olav. Foley and Margaret Reid, his assistant, abandoned Oslo on 9 April 1940 during the German advance, and travelled to Lillehammer and Åndalsnes. Before leaving Oslo, Foley and Reid burned the documents in the UK legation. Foley helped Norway's commander-in-chief, General Otto Ruge, contact Britain to request assistance against the invader. Foley had his own radio transmitter that allowed Ruge to communicate with London independently of Norwegian landlines. Reid was a cipher expert who coded messages sent to Britain. Until minister Cecil Dormer arrived on 16 April, Foley acted as a UK representative with Norwegian authorities. Foley and Reid were evacuated from Molde by the Royal Navy on 1 May. At Åndalsnes Foley presumably met Martin Linge, who acted as liaison officer.

On 1 January 1941, he was awarded Companion of the Order of St Michael and St George (CMG) as a captain in respect of his services to the Foreign Office. In 1941, he was given the task of questioning Hitler's Deputy Führer Rudolf Hess after Hess's flight to Scotland. After Hess was hospitalized in 1942, Foley helped coordinate MI5 and MI6 in running a network of double agents, the Double Cross System.

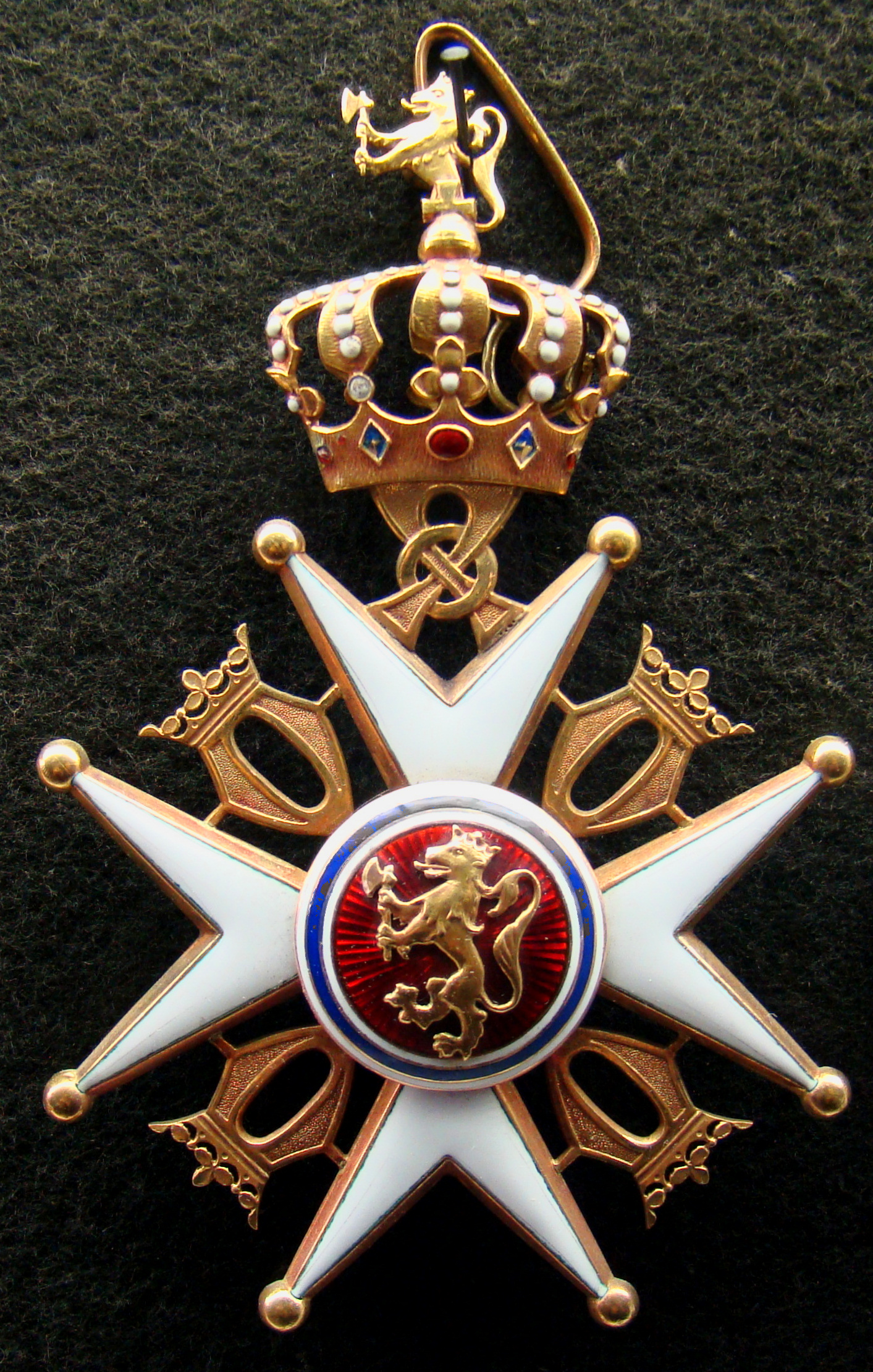
The Norwegian Order of St Olav

== Later life ==
Foley returned to Berlin very soon after the war under the cover of Assistant Inspector General of the Public Safety Branch of the Control Commission for Germany, where he was involved in hunting for Nazi war criminals.

In 1949, Foley retired to Stourbridge, Worcestershire, and died there in 1958. He is buried in Stourbridge Cemetery.

On 27 April 1961, the Daily Mail carried the story, written by his widow, of his activities to save as many Jews as he possibly could. When no excuse could be found for a visa to Britain, he contacted friends working in the embassies of other nations for their assistance in granting visas to their countries.

His widow, Katharine Eva Foley, died on 17 April 1979 at her home in Sidmouth, Devon.

== Honours and awards ==
- Mentioned in despatches for service in World War I
- Order of St Olav Knight's Cross (Norwegian) in 1941
- Companion of the Order of St Michael and St George on 1 January 1941
- Righteous Among the Nations, awarded in October 1999 posthumously by Israel
- British Hero of the Holocaust, awarded posthumously in 2010
- Congressional Gold Medal, awarded posthumously in 2024 by the United States

== Posthumous recognition ==
Foley was accorded the status of a Righteous Among the Nations by Israel's Yad Vashem as a direct result of testimony from "living witnesses" found by Michael Smith while researching his biography of Foley. Lord Janner, chairman of the Holocaust Educational Trust, was instrumental in persuading Yad Vashem to look at Smith's evidence. Some members of the Yad Vashem committee that determines whether someone should be named as a "righteous gentile" were initially sceptical that an MI6 officer would not have diplomatic immunity but the then Foreign Office historian Gill Bennett produced previously classified documents that demonstrated this to be the case. The cover of Smith's book features the photograph from Foley's first diplomatic passport with the date it was issued clearly shown as 11 August 1939.

In 2004 a remembrance plaque was dedicated to him at the entrance to Stourbridge's Mary Stevens Park. The following year volunteers from Highbridge, Foley's birthplace, raised money to erect their own tribute.

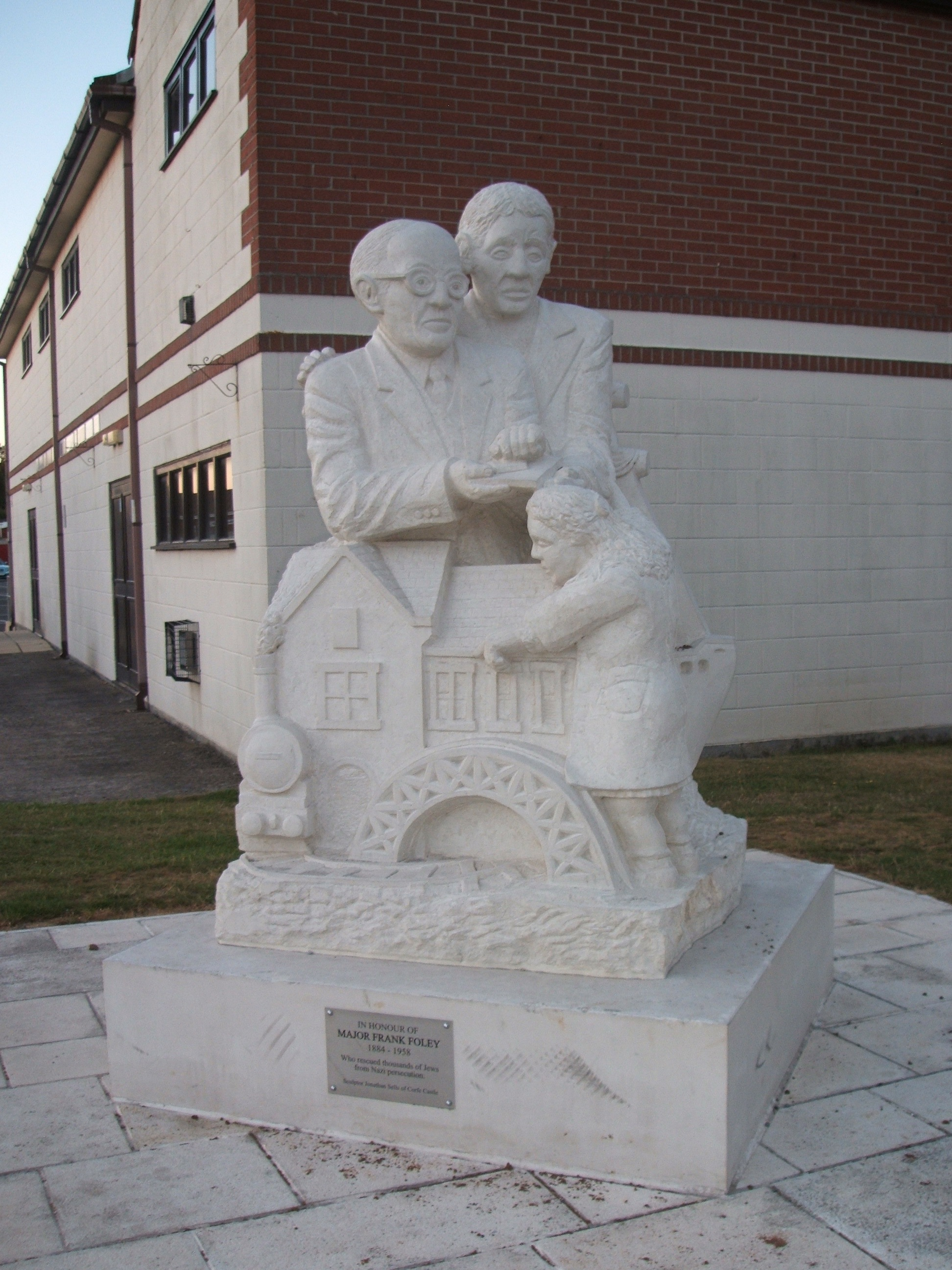
Statue of Frank Foley in Highbridge, Somerset

A statue was commissioned from sculptor Jonathan Sells and unveiled on the anniversary of VE Day, which is also the anniversary of his death. The 'Frank Foley Parkway' between Highbridge and Burnham-on-Sea opened on 7 July 2009.

In 2007, a film about Foley's life was in the planning stages, but the producers were then taking legal action against MI6 to release still-classified documents related to his work.

On 24 November 2004, (the 120th anniversary of his birth), descendants of Foley, relatives of those he saved, representatives of Jewish organisations, British MPs and other well-wishers gathered at the British Embassy in Berlin for the unveiling of a plaque honouring Foley. At the ceremony, Foreign Secretary Jack Straw praised Foley's heroism:

Frank Foley risked his life to save the lives of thousands of German Jews. Without the protection of diplomatic immunity he visited internment camps and sheltered Jewish refugees in his house. Frank Foley was a true British hero. It is right that we should honour him at the British Embassy in Berlin, not far from where he once worked.

On 31 May 2009, a garden was dedicated in his memory at London's Sternberg Centre, where a plaque was unveiled by Cherie Booth.

In 2010, Foley was named a British Hero of the Holocaust by the British Government.

In 2012, the Foreign Secretary, William Hague, unveiled a plaque to him at the Hoop Lane Jewish Cemetery in Golders Green, London, an initiative led by the Spanish and Portuguese Jews' Congregation and the West London Synagogue.

A National Express West Midlands bus is dedicated to him.

On 18 September 2018, Prince William, Duke of Cambridge, unveiled a statue of Frank Foley in Stourbridge in the presence of Foley's great-nephew, Stephen Higgs.

== Bibliography ==
- Smith, Michael (2016). Foley: The Spy Who Saved 10,000 Jews. Biteback. ISBN 9781785900549.
- Anon (1964). Who Was Who, Vol. V, 1951–60. Adam & Charles Black. ISBN 0713625988.
