= Alisa Tennenbaum =

Austrian-born Holocaust survivor (born 1929)

- Born: Liselotte Scherzer; 3 September 1929 (age 97); Vienna, Austria
- Occupations: Holocaust remembrance activist, librarian
- Known for: Chairwoman of the Kindertransport Children's Organisation in Israel

Alisa Tennenbaum (born Liselotte Scherzer; 3 September 1929) is an Austrian-born Israeli Holocaust survivor and remembrance activist, who served as chairwoman of the Kindertransport Children's Organisation in Israel and has given testimony at institutions in Israel and Europe. One of the last children to leave Vienna on the Kindertransport, she later became active in commemoration and testimony work in Israel and abroad.

== Biography ==
=== Childhood in Vienna and the Kindertransport ===
Tennenbaum was born in Vienna as Liselotte Scherzer, the daughter of Moses Mordko Scherzer and Edith (née Butterweck). After the annexation of Austria by Nazi Germany, her family was subjected to Nazi persecution. Following Kristallnacht, her father was arrested and sent to Dachau concentration camp, and later reached Britain via Kitchener Camp.

On 22 August 1939, aged nine, Tennenbaum was sent from Vienna to Britain on the Kindertransport, shortly before the outbreak of World War II. Upon arrival she was placed in a hostel for Jewish refugee girls in Tynemouth, north-east England, and also stayed at a hostel in Whitley Bay. In June 1940 she was transferred with other girls to Windermere, where she remained for the rest of the war.

=== Family reunion and immigration to Israel ===
Tennenbaum's mother remained in Europe, was deported to the Łódź Ghetto and subsequently to Auschwitz and forced labour camps, before being evacuated to Sweden at the end of the war. After the family was located through the Red Cross, Tennenbaum was reunited with her parents in Britain. In October 1949 the family immigrated to Israel and settled in Beit Yanai.

In January 1951 she married Benjamin Tennenbaum, a teacher at the ulpan where she had studied. The couple settled in Beit Herut, where they raised two daughters. Benjamin died in May 1967. She later worked for 27 years as a librarian at the regional high school of the Hefer Valley.

== Public activity and Holocaust remembrance ==
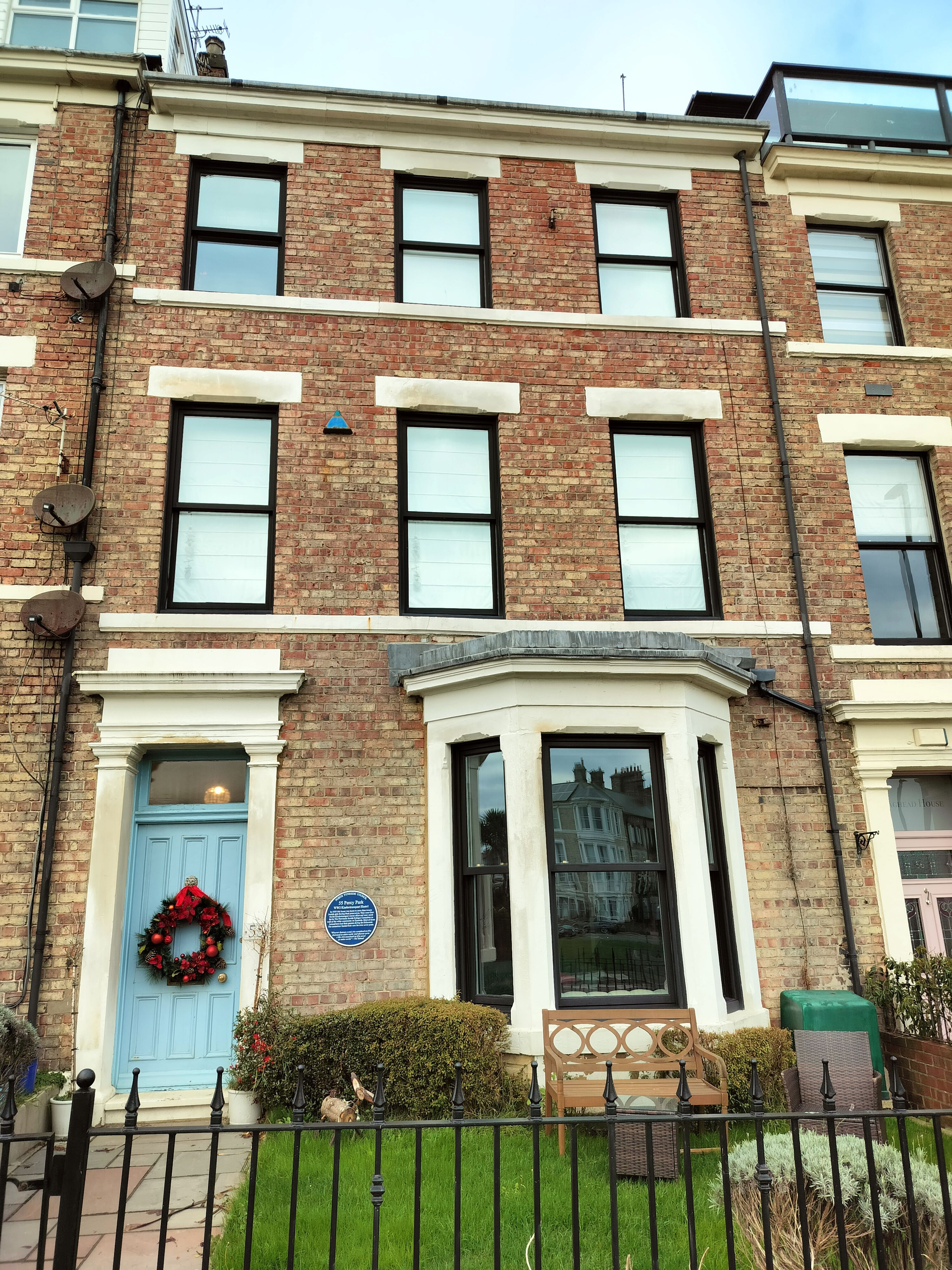
55 Percy Park, Tynemouth, with a blue plaque commemorating its use as a hostel

Tennenbaum served as chairwoman of the Kindertransport Children's Organisation in Israel, organising annual conferences and reunions and representing the organisation at public events in Israel and abroad. A 2015 article in The Jerusalem Post wrote that she had done "sterling work in keeping the Kindertransport community in Israel together" and noted that she had lectured at Yad Vashem to a group of around 80 Birthright participants.

She lectured to students and general audiences in Israel, Austria and Germany, and participated in commemorative events at institutions including Yad Vashem, Beit Terezin and the Austrian Embassy in Tel Aviv. In 2016 she was among those who lit memorial torches at the Yom HaShoah ceremony of the Massuah Institute. In January 2024 she was among the Kindertransport survivors invited to an official 85th anniversary ceremony at the residence of Israeli President Isaac Herzog.

Her story has been documented in research and remembrance initiatives in Israel and internationally. An academic thesis submitted to the University of Vienna in 2014 dedicated a full chapter to her life and testimony. Documents, photographs and archival material relating to her and her family are held at the United States Holocaust Memorial Museum (USHMM), the Ghetto Fighters' House Museum Archive, and other institutions, and are catalogued in the European Holocaust Research Infrastructure (EHRI) portal.

Tennenbaum was among the Kindertransport survivors featured in the Verdrängte Jahre ("Suppressed Years") exhibition of the Austrian national railway company ÖBB, which examined the role of the Austrian railways during the Nazi era; the exhibition dedicated a separate panel to her story, and she spoke at the closing event at Tel Aviv University in 2017. Her story also featured in the travelling educational exhibition Auf den Spuren eines Fotos, supported by the National Fund of the Republic of Austria for Victims of National Socialism.

In 2023, Tennenbaum was one of three surviving women from the Tynemouth hostel whose testimonies formed the basis of a BBC investigation and documentary podcast series The Girls: The Holocaust Safe House. As a result of the investigation, North Tyneside Council erected an official blue plaque at the former hostel.

Her testimony was incorporated into several cultural and documentary projects. Her account of the Windermere hostel was cited in a Leo Baeck Institute article on Alice Urbach, who ran the hostel during the war years. She provided testimony for the Austrian archive weiter erzählen / ERINNERN:AT and participated in the art project Days Outside of Time – Artist Meets Testimony at Beit Terezin. Prior to the staging of the play Children's Trains at Beit Zvi, she met with the production team and shared her experiences as a Kindertransport child.
