= The Essential Link: The Story of Wilfrid Israel =

2017 documentary by Yonatan Nir

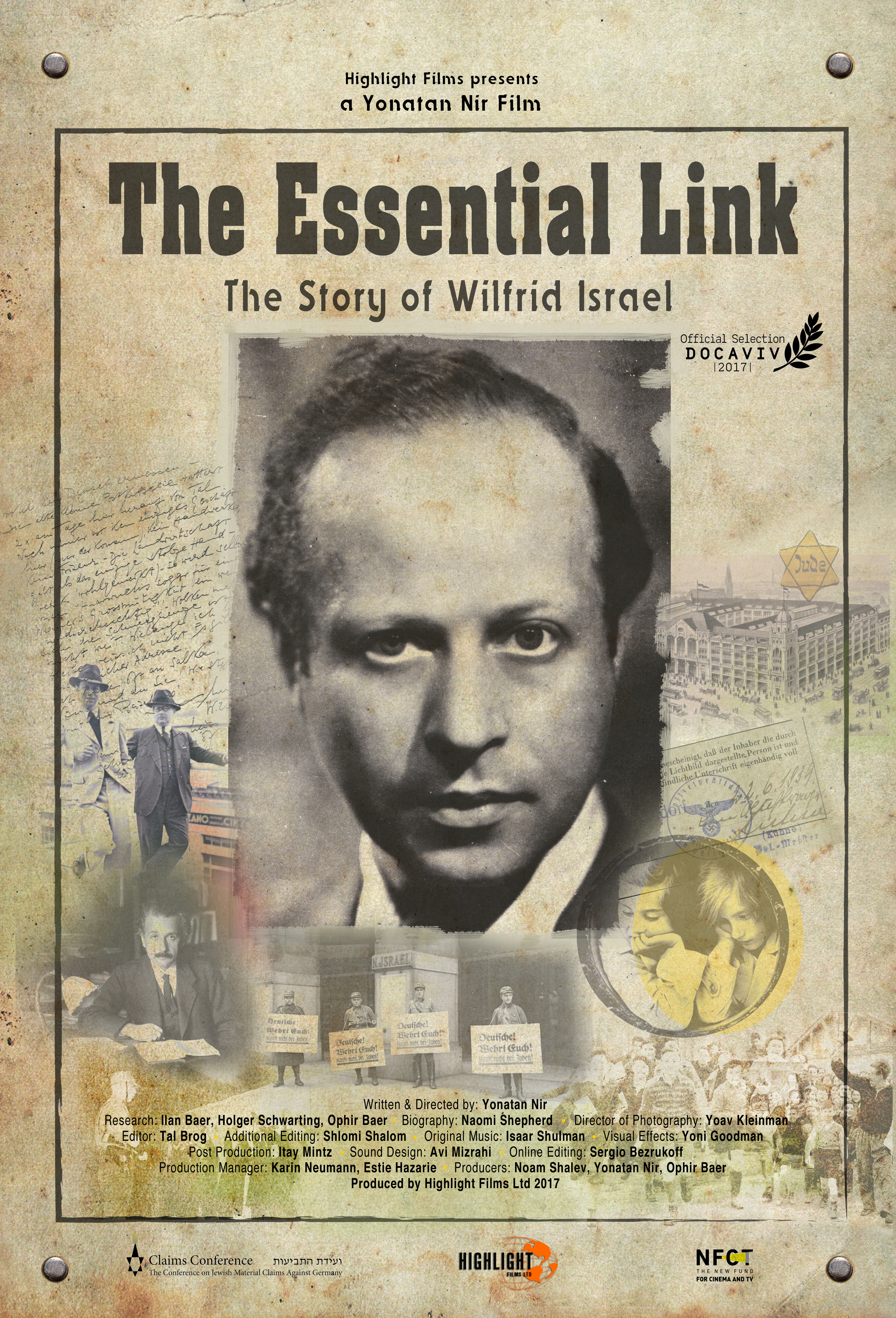
- Directed by: Yonatan Nir
- Produced by: Noam Shalev, Ilan Baer, Ophir Baer, Estie Hazarie
- Cinematography: Yoav Kleinman
- Edited by: Tal Brog, Shlomi Shalom
- Music by: Isaar Shulman
- Release date: May 12, 2017 (Israel)
- Running time: 71 minutes
- Country: Israel
- Languages: English, German, Hebrew, Russian, Spanish

The Essential Link: The Story of Wilfrid Israel is a documentary by Israeli director Yonatan Nir. The film, which is inspired by Naomi Shepherd's book Wilfrid Israel: German Jewry's Secret Ambassador, exposes the story of Wilfrid Israel - a wealthy Jewish businessman and owner of Berlin's largest department store in the 1930s, who was involved in the saving of tens of thousands of Jews and played a key role in the Kindertransport rescue operation. The film was produced by Highlight Films and premiered at the 2017 DocAviv International Film Festival. Among the major rescue efforts and operations, that are described in the film are the Kindertransport and the "Triangle" that beyond Wilfrid Israel included also Captain Frank Foley and Hubert Pollack, which saved according to estimations around 10,000 Jews.

== Interviewed subjects ==
The documentary features filmed interviews with Kindertransport survivors, members of Kibbutz HaZore'a, historians, scholars and relatives of Wilfrid Israel, including Alisa Tennenbaum, Prof. (Emeritus) Moshe Zimmermann and Prof. (Emeritus) Leslie Brent.

== Notable screenings ==
The documentary was screened in several film festivals and Holocaust remembrance events around the world.

== Short film (2012) ==
In 2012, a 34-minute documentary under the name of Wilfrid Israel: The Savior from Berlin was released by Yonatan Nir, Noam Shalev, Ophir Baer and Ilan Baer. The film is screened on a weekly basis at the Wilfrid Israel Museum in Kibbutz HaZore'a. Many of the materials that were collected during the production of the film were later used in The Essential Link: The Story of Wilfrid Israel.
