= Hubert Pollack =

Hubert Isaac Pollack (Hebrew: הוברט פולק; 1903 - 1967) was a German Jew whose clandestine activity prior to the Holocaust enabled him and his associates to save a large number of Jews. After his immigration to Israel, he served in the Haganah and the Israel Defense Forces.

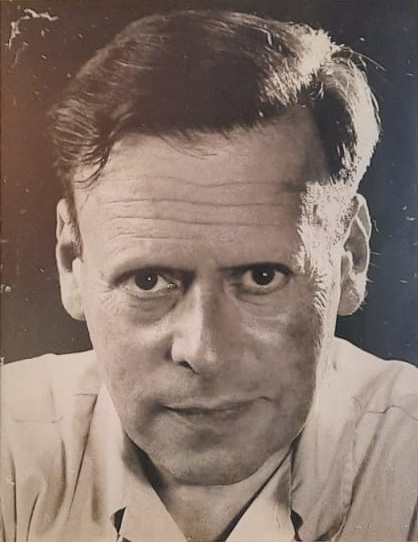
Portrait of Hubert Pollack

== Biography ==
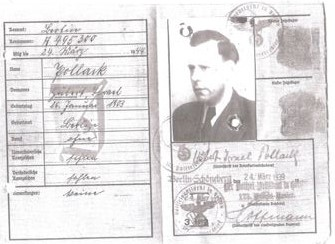
Pollack - ID with Gestapo Stamp

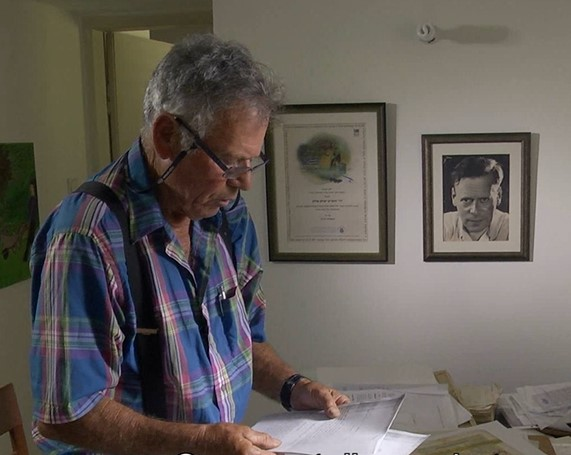
Adi Daliot and his father Hubert Pollack

Pollack was born in Berlin to Wilhelm and Johanna. He studied at the University of Berlin from 1921 to 1927 where he earned a PhD in economics and philosophy. From 1923 to 1929 he worked at the offices of Keren Hayesod - The United Israel Appeal in the state of Rhineland Westphalia-Bonn. During the years 1930 to 1933 he managed the office of statistics of the Jewish Community of Berlin. From 1933 to 1939 he was a consultant with the Palestine office of the community in Berlin. During those years he worked with Capt. Francis Frank Foley, a British Intelligence officer positioned in Berlin and whose cover title was the director of the visa office at the British Embassy. Together with Foley and Wilfrid Israel, who was his manager at the Jewish Assistance Company (Hilfsverein der deutschen Juden), they created an organization which operated in total secrecy and was under imminent threat. There was a clear designation of responsibilities: Wilfrid received requests from Jews, made lists of the names, raised the required funds and transferred them to Pollack. Pollack created contacts with Gestapo officers and gave them the names he received from Wilfrid, together with the bribes. Foley supplied the exit visas, prioritizing Jews who were already blacklisted by the Gestapo. The story of this organization is related in the film The Essential Link: The Story of Wilfrid Israel from Yonatan Nir.

In August 1939, aided by Foley he left Berlin with his family and made his way to Palestine.

Based on Pollack's testimony, parts of which were given during the Eichmann trial in 1961, Yad VaShem awarded Foley the title of Righteous Among the Nations. For details regarding their mutual operations see the book Foley: The Spy Who Saved 10,000 Jews by Michael Smith.

Pollack raised donations from survivors and former Berliners to commemorate Foley by planting a tree in his name in a Jewish National Fund (KKL) forest near the entrance to Kibbutz Har'el on the way to Jerusalem.

Pollack served in the Hagana while working for the British Mandate government. He fought during the siege on Jerusalem and continued as a research officer with the Israeli Intelligence Corps until he retired. Pollack died a week after the Six Day War (1967), not knowing that Foley would be honored by the Jewish people.
