= My Hero Brother =

2016 film by Yonatan Nir

- Release date: 2016
- Country: Israel

My Hero Brother is a 2016 documentary film directed by the Israeli filmmaker Yonatan Nir. The film tells the story of a group of young people with Down syndrome who embark on a demanding trek through the Indian Himalayas, accompanied by their brothers and sisters. As the siblings deal with formidable physical and emotional challenges, unresolved conflicts come to the surface and heart-warming friendships develop. The original soundtrack was written and performed by Ehud Banai.

The film was premiered at the Santa Barbara International Film Festival on 7 February 2017 and won the Best Documentary Film Award and the Audience Choice Award. It also won the Best Documentary Audience Award at the Philadelphia Jewish Film Festival 37.

== Background ==
Enosh Cassel wanted his younger brother Hanan to experience the travel to parts unknown undertaken by many young Israelis after their army service. "He doesn't speak so well, and it's hard to know what's going on in his daily life when we speak on the phone," he said. "We needed to go through something intensive and then I could understand what life is like for him right now." That first trip "wasn’t easy but was great," said Cassel. When they returned home and were interviewed by Channel 2, there was a wave of reaction from others with siblings with Down syndrome. "We got a lot of reactions," said Cassel. "And we understood that we'd done something very positive that awakened all kinds of impressions." When Itamar Peleg, the owner of Travelog, a tour company specializing in unusual journeys, contacted Cassel, the two began planning a trip for 22 siblings, 11 pairs. They spent two years planning the trip, handling the bureaucracy, crowdfunding and bringing together the group for regular meetings in order to get to know one another.

== Production ==
On 10 August, 22 siblings, three film crew members and a physician left Tel Aviv for New Delhi. A week later, the high-altitude trek began from Lohajung, about 300 kilometres (190 mi) from Uttarakhand, capital of Dehradun, to Bedni Bugyal. On 10 October 2013, they reached their destination. It was 11,800 feet (3,600 m) in the Himalayas where the peaks reach to altitudes above 25,000 feet (7,600 m). The team members cheered, hugged each other, pitched the Israeli national flag and posed for photographs. The film was released in Israel on 11 July 2016.

== Accolades ==
The film won the Santa Barbara International Film Festival 2017 Best Documentary Film Award and the Audience Choice Award. My Hero Brother also won the Best Documentary Audience Award at the Philadelphia Jewish Film Festival 37.
