= Wilfrid Israel =

Jewish Anglo-German businessman active in the Kindertransport

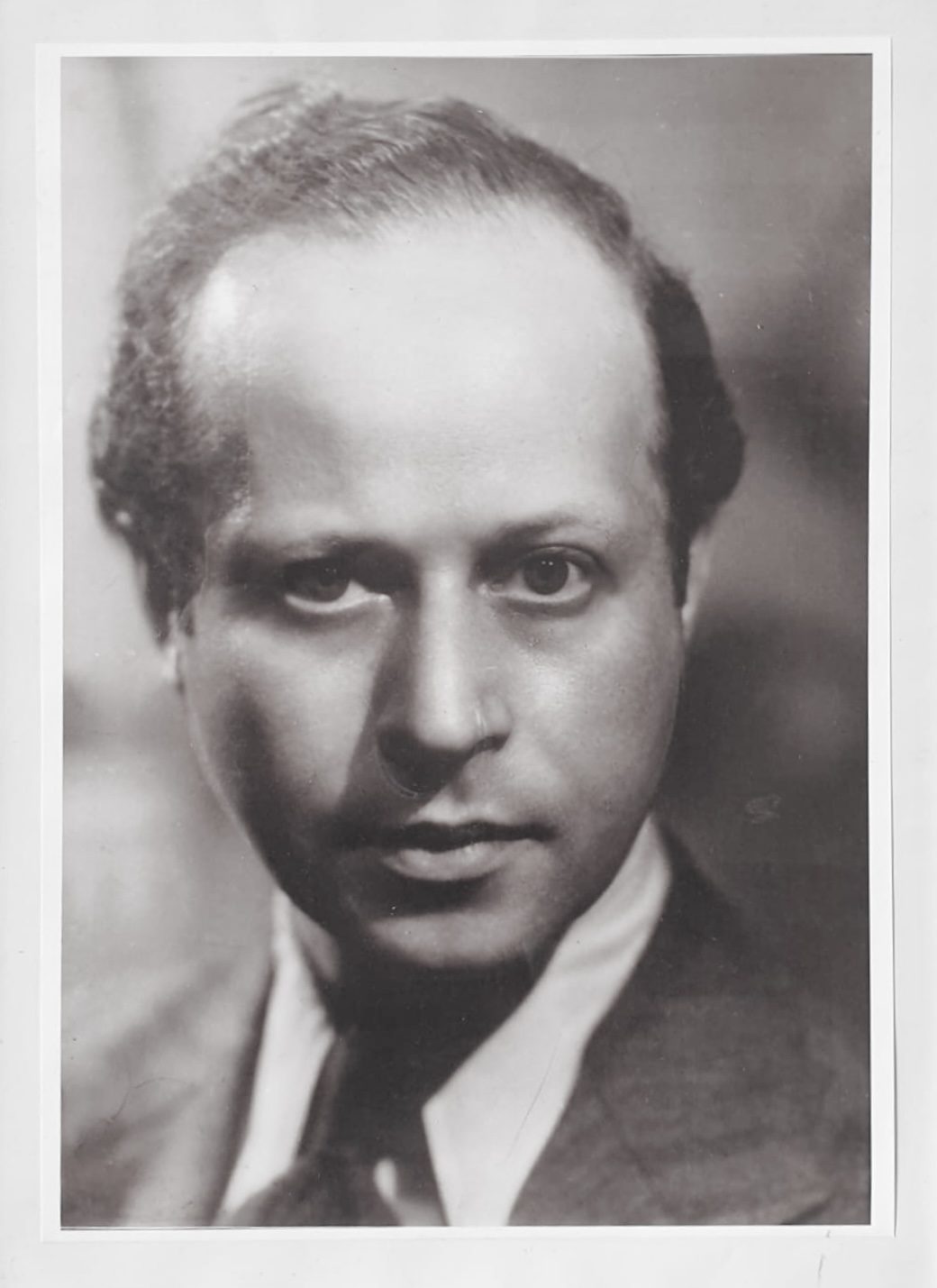
Portrait in the Wilfrid Israel Museum in HaZore'a, Israel

Wilfrid Berthold Jacob Israel (11 July 1899 – 1 June 1943) was an Anglo-German businessman and philanthropist, born into a wealthy Anglo-German Jewish family, who was active in the rescue of Jews from Nazi Germany, and who played a significant role in the Kindertransport.

Described as "gentle and courageous" and "intensely secretive", Wilfrid Israel avoided public office and shunned publicity, but had, according to his biographer Naomi Shepherd, an "almost hypnotic" ability to influence friends and colleagues. Martin Buber described him as "a man of great moral stature, dedicated to the service of others".

He was killed when his civilian passenger plane, en route from Lisbon to Bristol, was shot down by a Luftwaffe fighter patrol over the Bay of Biscay.

== Biography ==
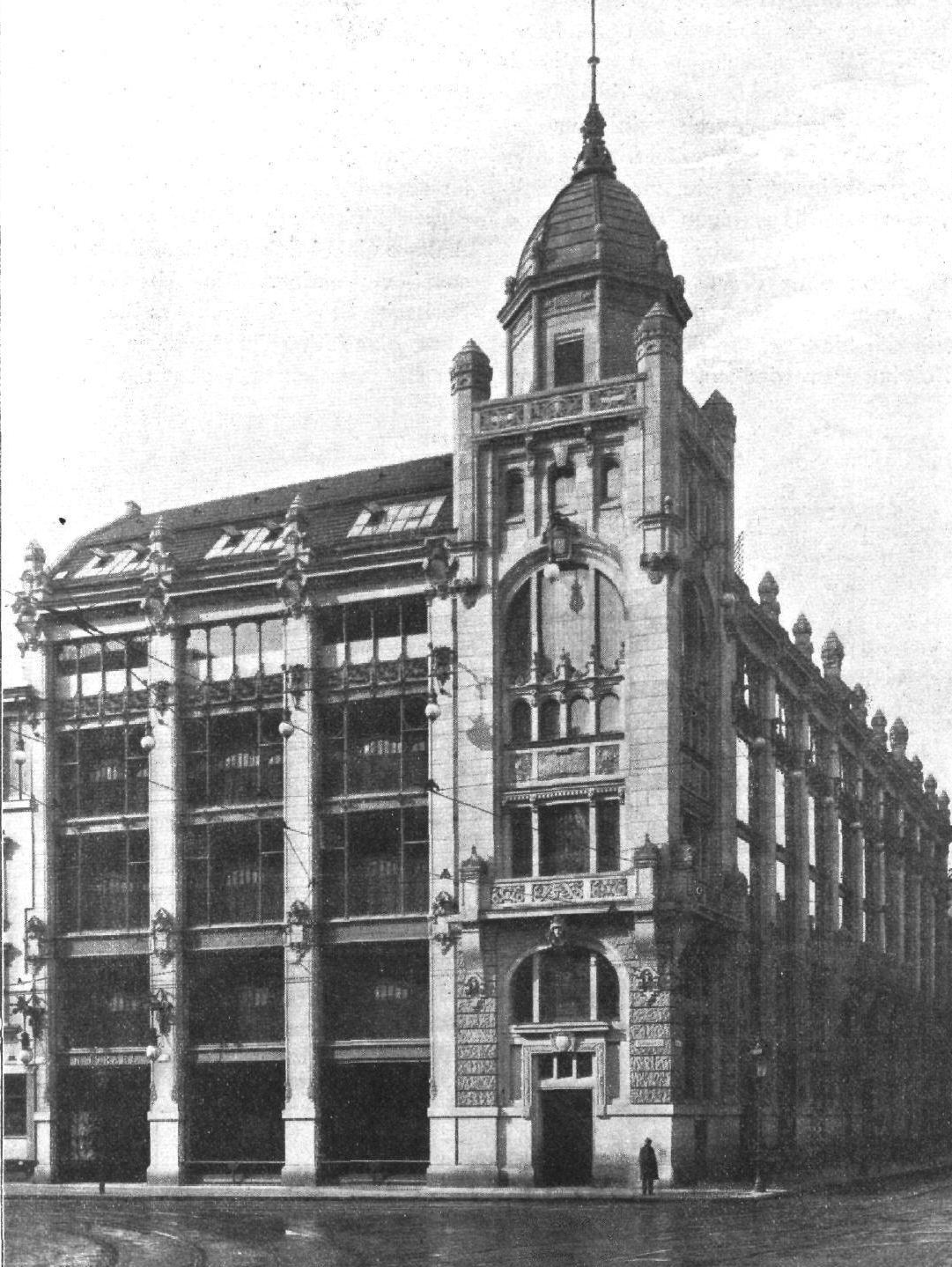
Israel's department store in Berlin

Wilfrid Israel attended the Mommsen-Gymnasium in Berlin-Charlottenburg and, for a few months in 1911, the Hochalpines Lyceum in Zuoz/Institut Engiadina (today Lyceum Alpinum Zuoz) in Switzerland.

Following World War I, he began to travel the world, including the Far East and took a special interest in works of art of this region. With the outbreak of the global economic crisis, he helped bring the Habima Theatre to Mandatory Palestine.

On 27 September 1931, Wilfrid Israel took his Indian guest V. A. Sundaram to his friend Albert Einstein's summer home in the German town of Caputh to meet Einstein. Sundaram was Mahatma Gandhi's disciple and special envoy, whom Wilfrid Israel had met while visiting India and visiting the Indian leader's home in 1925. During the visit, Einstein wrote a short letter to Gandhi that was delivered to him through his envoy. Gandhi responded quickly with his own letter. Although in the end, Einstein and Gandhi were unable to meet as they had hoped, the direct connection between them was established through Wilfrid Israel.

In 1932, Recha Freier appealed to Wilfrid for financial aid to seed the beginning of her vision for Youth Aliyah to Palestine to save Jewish lives. Wilfrid Israel provided the funds. Initially, twelve young people were sent to the Ben Shemen Youth Village in Palestine.

Wilfrid Israel's family-owned the Nathan Israel Department Store in Berlin, one of the largest and oldest stores in pre-World War II Germany. From early in the Nazi period, Wilfrid Israel used the business as a base from which to engineer the release of prisoners from Nazi concentration camps: many in the Nazi leadership had accounts at the store and were never charged. Israel also financed the emigration of his Jewish employees (roughly a third of the staff) by paying them two years' salary at the time they left Germany.

Philanthropy was only a small part of his rescue activities. Israel, though arrested and beaten and followed on his journeys abroad by the Gestapo, attempted, through influential contacts in Britain, to persuade the British to grant admission to "transit camps" in Britain for Jews released from the German concentration camps; eight thousand young men were saved in this way. He also lobbied the Foreign Office directly for this purpose through visits to the British Embassy (recorded in the British National Archives). Less officially, he formed a working partnership with Frank Foley, the British intelligence agent who was Passport Officer at the British consulate in Berlin, vouching for the characters of Jews in line to emigrate, while warning Foley of German agents who attempted to infiltrate.

Together with Hubert Pollack, a Jewish statistician who worked under Wilfrid Israel in the "Hilfsverein" (lit. 'Aid association'; German Jewish welfare and emigration organization) and who also worked secretly under Foley, the three of them formed a secretive mechanism to save as many Jews as possible from the concentration camps. Pollack had contacts in the Gestapo; Wilfrid had money and direct links with sponsors abroad; Foley was the man in charge of issuing visas. Pollack, always carrying a Mauser pistol in his pocket was the essential intermediary between Wilfrid, Foley and the Gestapo. He met them in small cafes, where money could easily pass hands. People came to Wilfrid pleading for his help in releasing their relations from the camps; Wilfrid gave the necessary funds to Pollack; Pollack obtained the documents; and Foley granted visas to those who Wilfrid and Pollack told him were honest people whose names had been blackened by the Gestapo. Pollack and Wilfrid kept Foley informed of any agents planted by the Gestapo in the lines of applicants for visas. In the last years and months up to the Kristallnacht, they managed to save some 10,000 Jews.

Wilfrid Israel played a significant role in the Kindertransport, the rescue of 10,000 German Jewish children after the Kristallnacht pogrom of November 1938. By this time, most of the Jewish leadership in Germany had been arrested, and Israel took over the running of the Hilfsverein, the German Jewish welfare and emigration organization established at the turn of the century. He (as well as others) urged the British Anglo-Jewish leadership to ensure the rescue of German Jewish children, but without their parents, to England. The Anglo-Jewish leadership organized a deputation to the British prime minister. However, in the aftermath of the Kristallnacht pogrom, no British Jew was prepared to visit Germany, and the British government was initially skeptical about the willingness of parents to part with their children. But a Quaker delegation, all of whose members had previously worked with Wilfrid Israel on relief matters (a link going back to the post-World War I era) was sent out, and directed by Israel and, together with the German women's organisation, the Frauenbund, met with the parents and provided the British government with the necessary reassurance.

The Israel department store in Berlin was first vandalised, then taken over by the Nazis after a forced sale at a fraction of its worth, and Wilfrid Israel left Germany, but returned on the eve of the war to organise the despatch of the last contingent of children, only leaving when warned that his arrest was imminent. An example of Wilfred Israel's foresight and compassion is that he arranged to give money and other support to many employees of the Israel firm to aid them to flee the country, many ultimately to America.

Settling in London, he first worked with Bloomsbury House, the organization dealing with German Jewish refugees interned as 'enemy aliens'. In 1941, he became research assistant on Germany to a Royal Institute of International Affairs committee based at Balliol College, Oxford, now working for the Foreign Office, and at the same time advised the Refugee Department of the F.O. on movements of refugees throughout Europe. Among his papers from that period are those dealing with the question of German resistance to Hitler (which he dismissed, despite his friendship with Adam von Trott, one of its members).

Israel was a descendant on his English mother's side of the first Chief Rabbi of Britain. Contemporaries described him as an elegant, elusive figure most famously inspiring the character Bernhard Landauer in Christopher Isherwood's novel Goodbye to Berlin. Landauer figures prominently in his own right in the autobiographical Christopher and His Kind, by the same author.

He was a friend of Albert Einstein, the philosopher Martin Buber, and Chaim Weizmann, later the first president of the state of Israel. In his post-World War I refugee work, he was in contact with the British Quakers. His Anglo-Jewish connections included Herbert Samuel, previously Home Secretary in the British government and leader of the British Liberal Party. These contacts were valuable in his later rescue missions.

Brenda Bailey, daughter of a British Quaker mother and a German Quaker father, wrote: "After Kristallnacht, leadership was again shown by the Jewish businessman Wilfrid Israel, who contacted the Council for German Jewry in London, informing them that extraordinary measures must now be taken to save at least the children."

== Initiation of the Kindertransport ==
=== Official and non-official roles ===
Wilfrid Israel is described in the British Foreign Office records, now in the National Archives in London, as 'chief representative of German Jewry'. His repeated appeals to the British government on behalf of German Jewry are documented there. There is also a reference to these attempts in copies of his personal letters now deposited in a Wilfrid Israel archive in the Wiener Library London (the main source of Holocaust records in the UK, where the records of the Council for German Jewry are also to be found).

=== Situation on and after the Kristallnacht ===
From 1937 Wilfrid Israel was active in the work of the Hilfsverein, the central German Jewish organization for emigration. It was to the Hilfsverein that all Jews lacking funds and contacts enabling them to emigrate (the vast majority by 1937) applied for help. By the time of the Kristallnacht pogrom of November 1938 Wilfrid Israel was the director (Vorsitzender) of the Hilfsverein. By this time the family firm which he had headed had been requisitioned by the Nazis, and most of the other official male heads of German Jewish organizations had been arrested.

It was as the representative of German Jewry that Wilfrid Israel had described the details of Nazi persecution to British diplomats and government officials visiting Berlin, and also proposals for emigration to Britain. A last desperate plea, following the Kristallnacht, was made in London (together with two other German Jewish leaders, Paul Eppstein and Otto Hirsch). This was rejected. However: another of Wilfrid Israel's proposals, for the establishment of a transit camp in Britain for young men released from the concentration camps, was accepted, saving eight thousand lives - a no less impressive rescue than that of the Kindertransport. Wilfrid Israel did indeed use his personal connections in Britain, most notably Lord Samuel (a previous Home Secretary) and at the time of the Kristallnacht the head of the Council for German Jewry- which had given assurances to the British government for support of Jewish refugees. It was to this organization that Wilfrid Israel turned, again on behalf of German Jews as a whole, and contacted Samuel with the request for the rescue of unaccompanied Jewish children.

The request was accepted only after two deputations to the Prime Minister and the Home Secretary by Samuel - and Chaim Weizmann, the Zionist leader. The second deputation included representatives of the British Quakers, who visited Germany and under Wilfrid Israel's guidance were able to confirm that Jewish parents were indeed willing to part with their children. Wilfrid Israel's connection with the Quakers went back to the period following World War I when he was also active in refugee work.

=== The relevant three weeks ===
On Nov. 1st, Lord Herbert Samuel led an Anglo-Jewish deputation to the Prime Minister, Neville Chamberlain, asking for the British government to relax its stringent immigration laws to permit the entry of the children. He received only sympathy and a non-committal answer.

On the morning of Nov. 8th, when the Goebbels press campaign first became obvious, Wilfrid Israel, representing the Reichsvertretung der Juden in Deutschland, called on George Ogilvie-Forbes, the British Chargé d'Affaires in Berlin. He came "to express grave apprehension that reprisals will be taken on Jews in Germany".

On Nov. 9th, Wilfrid Israel telephoned Chaim Weizmann, President of the World Zionist Organisation, in London. Weizmann immediately telephoned the Foreign Office. He was "in considerable distress" as he told of his information that the situation in Germany had "changed most dangerously during the last 24 hours". The German Jews thought that the only way to save the situation was for 'some prominent non-Jewish Englishman to go over to Berlin immediately".

On the same day Anglo-Jewry leaders representing the CGJ, meet in London with Sir Michael Bruce and request him to immediately go to Berlin, meet with Wilfrid Israel and other leaders "... who are only awaiting the arrival of a messenger to transmit reports on the treatment of our people."

On Nov. 15th, Wilfrid cabled the Council for German Jewry with details of the problems facing the community, and proposed the immediate rescue of German-Jewish children and young people up to the age of seventeen.

The pogroms and the incarceration of many more young Jews, sent Wilfrid back to the British Embassy on Nov. 17th, on behalf of the Reichsvertretung, to ask formally that Britain do all possible 'to accelerate the emigration of Jews from Germany, and particularly those who had been driven from their homes – about ten to fifteen thousand – and install them in temporary camps whence they could be evacuated in due course to their country of destination'.

An Anglo-Jewish deputation led by Lord Samuel, which included Chaim Weizmann, Lionel de Rothschild and the Chief Rabbi of the UK, Joseph Herman Hertz, hastily put together a petition based on the cable and went to see the Prime Minister, Neville Chamberlain. His initial response was non-committal, but the proposals were debated at a cabinet meeting the following day. No leading British Jew was prepared to risk visiting Germany, but here Wilfrid Israel's connections with the Quakers paid off. A delegation of Quakers headed by Bertha Bracey visited Germany to verify the willingness of German parents to part with their children. They met with Wilfrid Israel who introduced them to the heads of the Frauenbund, the German Jewish women's organisation with branches all over the country. Together, Quakers and Jews visited the Jewish communities all over the country and reported back to the British Home Office (in charge of immigration to Britain). One of the Quakers returned to London within days. His report made it clear that German Jewry wanted help for emigration, not relief on the spot.

On Nov. 21st, Lord Samuel led another delegation – this time made up of both – Jewish and non-Jewish representatives of groups concerned with refugees. – to Home Secretary Samuel Hoare. Samuel was accompanied by Lola Hahn Warburg, Wilfrid's friend and colleague in Youth Aliya, who had left Germany in the autumn, and was henceforth to be one of the chief workers for the child rescue in England, and Bertha Bracey, of the British Quakers, who brought Ben Greene, the Quaker who had returned to deliver the first-hand evidence. Greene testified to the plea of the German parents and their readiness to part with their children.

Speaking in the House of Commons that evening, Hoare announced that the government had agreed to the admission of refugee children, quoting Greene's evidence. Around this time, Wilfrid's previous and continued appeals were reinforced by the return to England of Sir Michael Bruce, who now impressed everyone in London with his first-hand information and knowledge. By this deceleration, removing the legal and official constraints, the Kindertransport could finally be launched.

=== Later involvement and conclusion ===
After officially leaving Germany in mid-1939, Wilfrid Israel returned to Berlin to help Hannah Karminski and other members of the Frauenbund organize the last groups of German Jewish children of the Kindertransport. He left finally days before the outbreak of war. But there is more here than the omission of one name, important as that name may be. The history of the Kindertransport, as presented in several accounts, omits the role played by German Jewish organizations and their leaders, most of whom remained in Germany to help their co-religionists despite the fact that they themselves had visas and were able to escape. This included Wilfrid Israel's closest collaborators, Eppstein, Hirsch and Karminski, all of whom perished. The reason for this omission is the relative paucity of documentation, as the records of the Jewish organizations involved were mostly destroyed. It is also because the eyewitness accounts are those of the former Kindertransport children themselves, who were of course unaware of the negotiations which preceded their rescue. However even a glance at the newsreel reportage of the departure and arrival of the children indicates the meticulous preparation of the Kindertransport by its German Jewish organizers, and of the restraint of the parents: the children all carefully dressed, each with a small knapsack and suitcase, and equipped with tags around their necks indicating his or her identity.

In conclusion, the idea of the Kindertransport did not originate with Anglo Jewry; their deputations were the response to an appeal made by Wilfrid Israel as representative of the Jewish community in Germany.

The initiative, and the idea (undoubtedly linked to the British refusal to admit children to Palestine), was that of German Jewry itself.

As for Wilfrid Israel's activities on behalf of children and young people of which the Kindertransport was only one example: many years earlier, he was among the sponsors of Youth Aliya and on his last mission to wartime Europe, he drew up plans for the rescue of Jewish children in Vichy France.

== Personal life ==
Wilfrid Israel was a homosexual but this was repressed and hidden, and as such was also referred to in two books by Christopher Isherwood - Goodbye to Berlin (1939) and Christopher and His Kind published in 1976. Both books were later adapted to films.

== Death ==
On 26 March 1943, Israel left London for Lisbon, Portugal and spent the next two months distributing certificates of entry to British-ruled Palestine, and investigating the situation of Jews on the peninsula; during World War II the right-wing governments in Spain and Portugal had some sympathies with Nazi Germany but refused to hand over Jews to the Germans. Before Israel left the Iberian Peninsula, he had also formulated a plan to rescue Jewish children from Vichy France – an enterprise partially carried out after his death. Israel was killed, aged 43, on 1 June 1943 when British Overseas Airways Corporation Flight 777 was shot down over the Bay of Biscay by eight German Junkers Ju 88s.

== Commemoration ==
=== Memorials ===
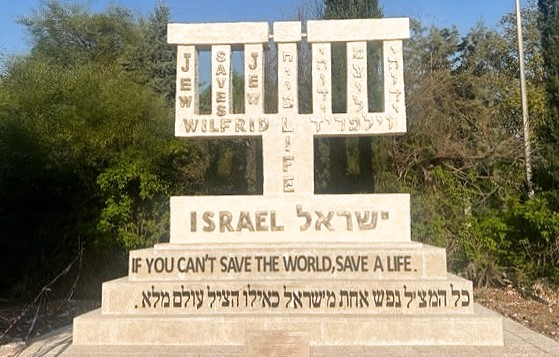
Memorial to Wilfrid Israel who risked his life to save over 20,000 Jews during the Holocaust

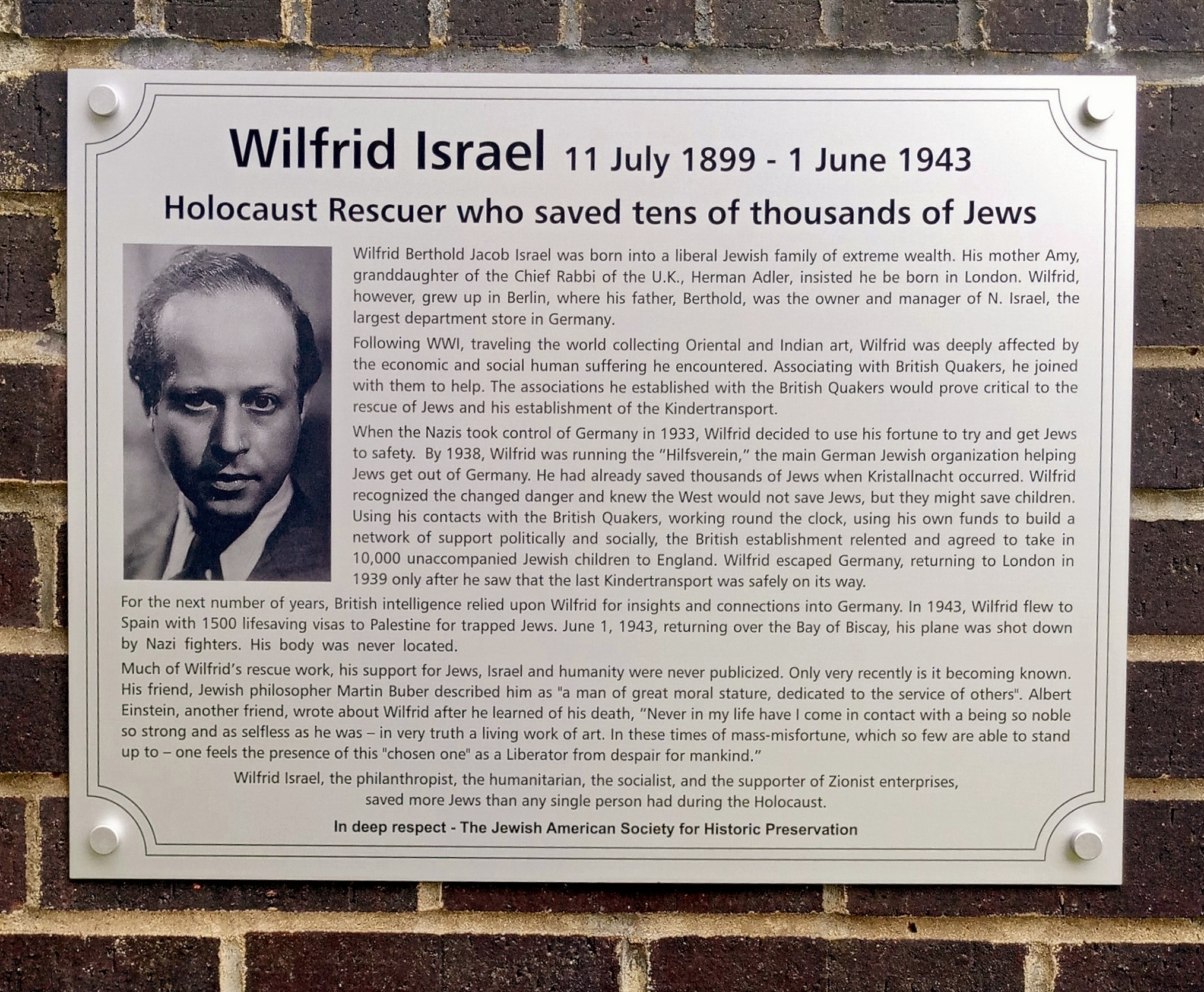
Hoops Lane memorial plaque dedicated to Wilfrid Israel

A major memorial has been erected adjacent to the ancient Levite city of Tel Yokneam in Israel, in honor of Wilfrid Israel and all those Jews who risked their lives to save fellow Jews during the Holocaust. The 14' memorial, designed by noted Jerusalem sculptor Sam Philipe, was funded by the Jewish American Society for Historic Preservation.

=== Tribute letter from Albert Einstein ===
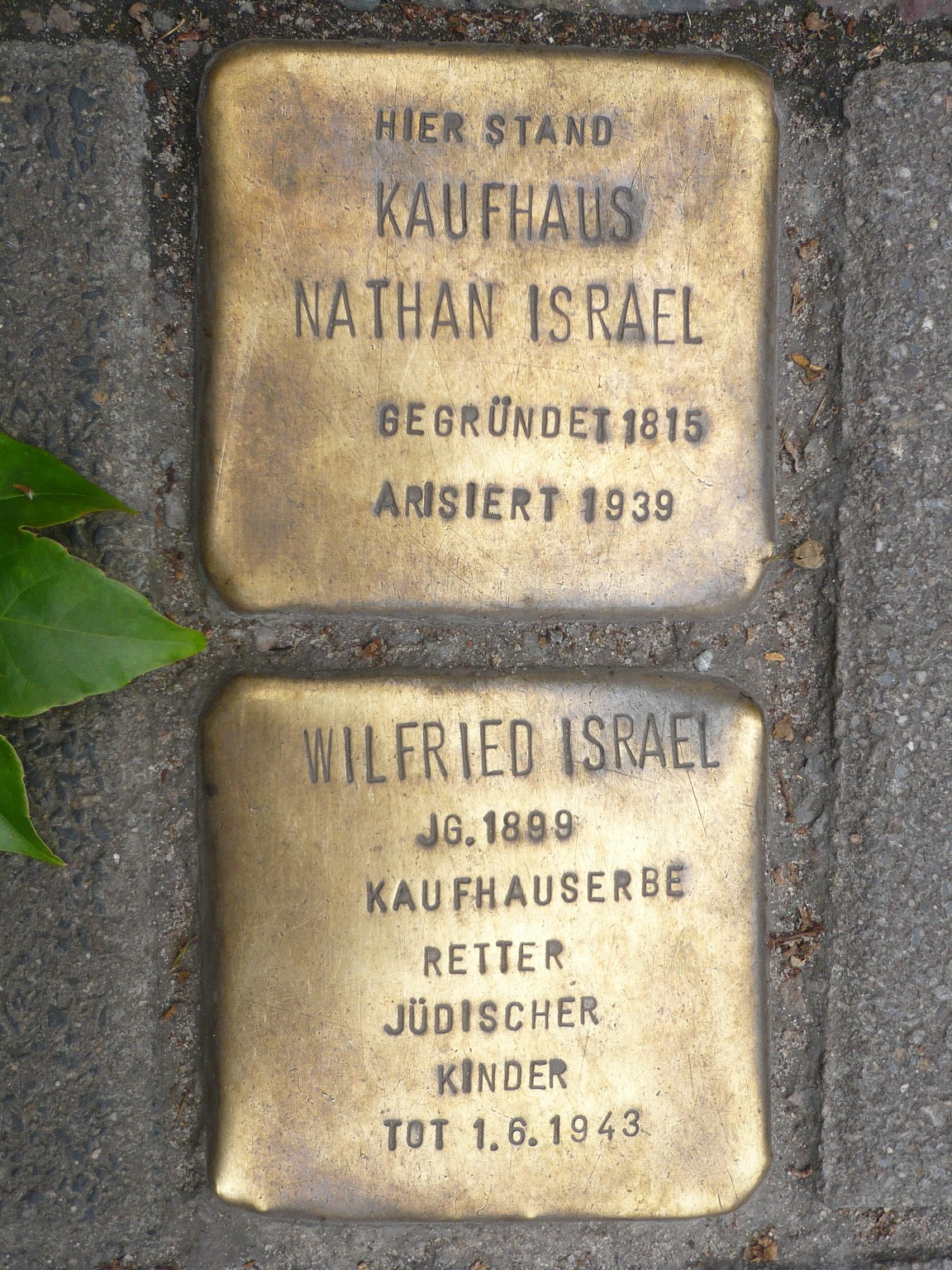
Stolpersteine at the site of the family firm, Mitte, Berlin

Princetown, N.J. VI. 14. '43.

Dear Mrs. Israel,
A deep desire prompts me to write to you as I know your great anxiety regarding the fate of your son. Never in my life have I come in contact with a being so noble, so strong and as selfless as he was – in very truth a living work of art.

In these times of mass-misfortune, which so few are able to stand up to – one feels the presence of this "chosen one" as a Liberator from despair for mankind.

I dare yet to hope that through a miracle he has been spared to us. Yet it urges me, though so helpless, to assure you of my deepest sympathy in these most tragic hours.

With heartfelt wishes, A. Einstein

=== Wilfrid Israel Museum ===
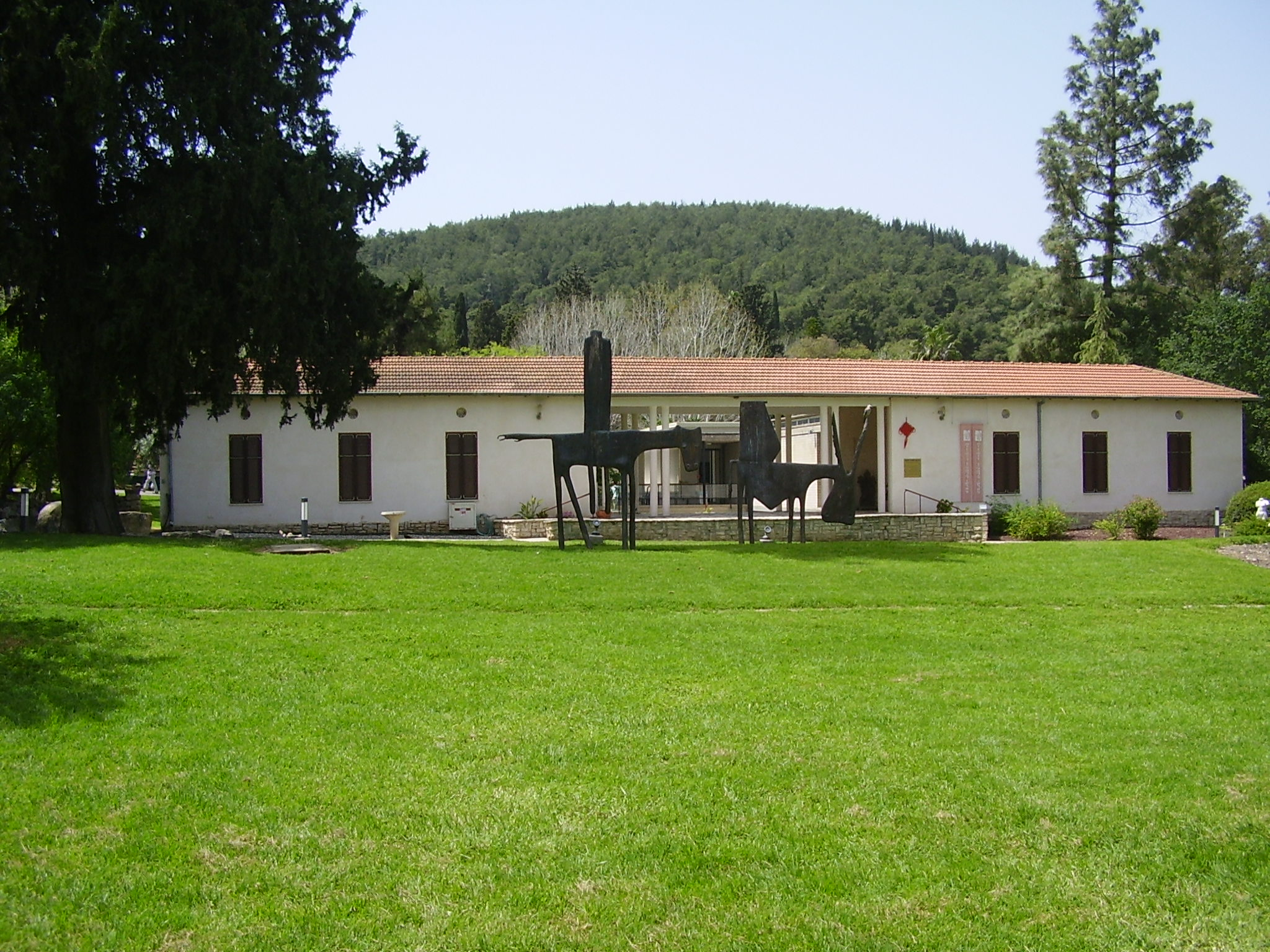
Wilfrid Israel Museum

The Wilfrid Israel Museum in Kibbutz HaZore'a, Israel, is an archaeology and art museum dedicated to the memory of Wilfrid Israel. The museum opened in 1951 and houses Wilfrid Israel's unique collection, to which many artefacts have been added over the years. The museum displays have permanent exhibitions of the art of India, China, Thailand, Cambodia, the art of the ancient Near East, and local archaeology. In addition, the museum holds changing exhibitions of modern painting, sculpture, photography, and textiles. It offers a wide range of community educational programs for children, youth and adults, including guided tours of the museum's permanent and temporary exhibitions as well as creative hands-on activities in the museum's art workshop.

In August 2020, burglars stole around 30 artefacts from the museum.

=== Wilfrid Israel film ===
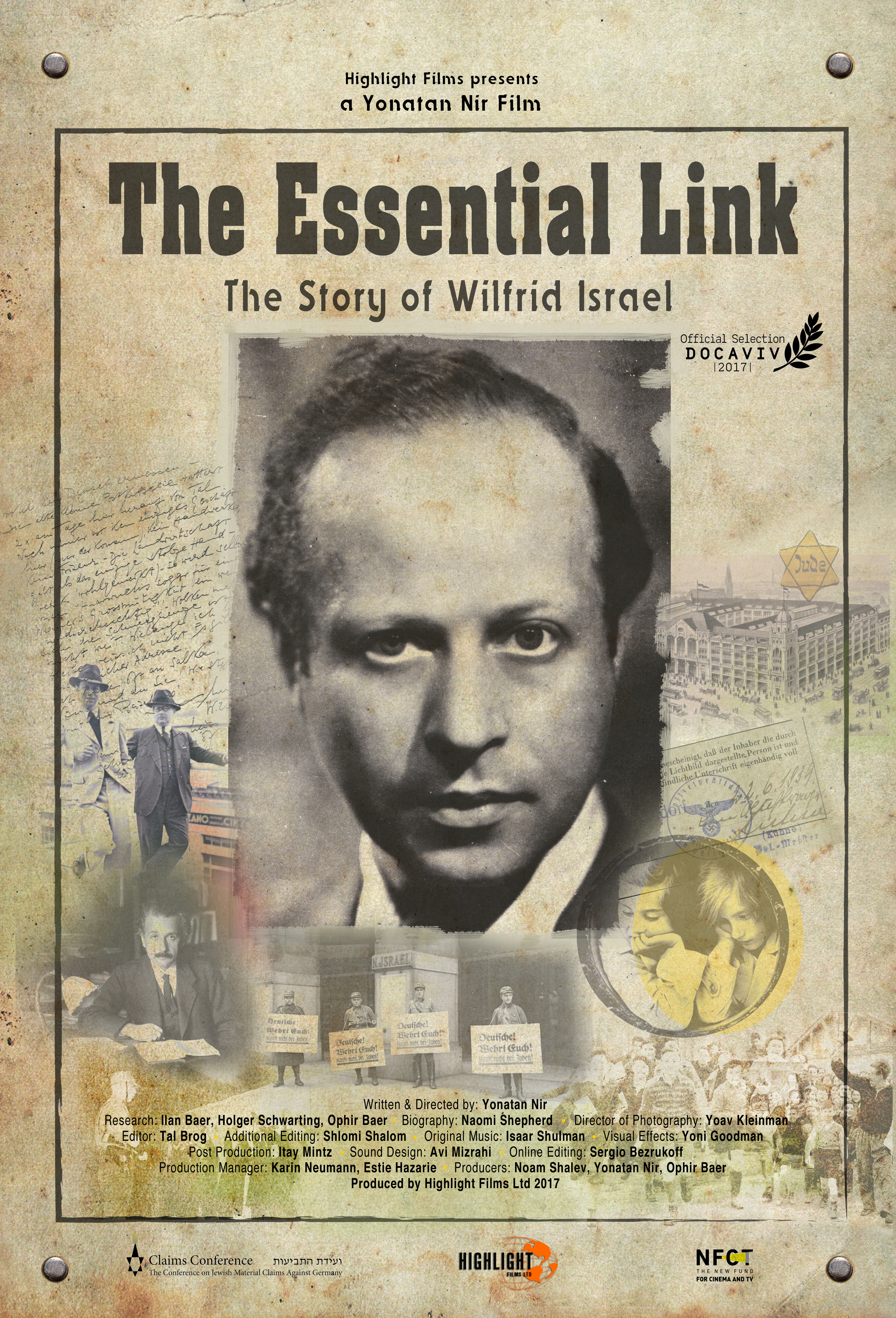
The poster describes the contents and creators of the film that was released in 2017.

A film by award-winning filmmaker Yonatan Nir and producer Noam Shalev premiered in Israel on 1 November 2016. The film, The Essential Link: The Story of Wilfrid Israel, is inspired by the biography written by Naomi Shepherd. It tells the story of Wilfrid Israel's life-saving activities, his connections with the founders of Kibbutz HaZore'a and mostly focuses on the last ten years of his life. The film's website "The Essential Link: The Story of Wilfrid Israel" provides more information about the person and the film and includes a link to its trailer.

== Bibliography ==
- Bailey, J. E. Brenda (1994). A Quaker couple in Nazi Germany: Leonhard Friedrich survives Buchenwald. York: Sessions. ISBN 1-85072-131-9.
- Bauer, Yehuda (1981). American Jewry and the Holocaust: The American Jewish Joint Distribution Committee, 1939–1945. Detroit: Wayne State University. ISBN 0-8143-1672-7.
- Buber, Martin (1944). Wilfrid Israel: July 11th, 1899 – June 1st, 1943 (1st ed.). London: Marsland.
- Shepherd, Naomi (1984). A Refuge from Darkness: Wilfrid Israel and the Rescue of The Jews. New York: Pantheon. ISBN 978-0394525037.
  - Published as Wilfrid Israel, German Jewry's Secret Ambassador by Weidenfeld and Nicolson, London, in 1984; in German translation by Siedler Verlag, Munich; and in Hebrew as "שגריר ללא ארץ", the Bialik Institute in 1989. This biography won the Wingate Prize for the best book on Jewish subjects for 1984
