= Philadelphia Jewish Film Festival =

Annual film festival

Gershman Philadelphia Jewish Film Festival (GPJFF)
- Location: Philadelphia, Pennsylvania
- Founded: 1981; 45 years ago
- Hosted by: Gershman Y
- Website: pjff.org

The Philadelphia Jewish Film Festival (also known as the Gershman Philadelphia Jewish Film Festival (GPJFF)) is an annual film festival in Philadelphia, Pennsylvania, in the United States that presents movies and film-related programs about the Jewish experience, culture, values, and legacy.

== Organization ==
The Philadelphia Jewish Film Festival is organized and hosted by the Gershman Y, an arts and culture nonprofit organization that has its roots in the Philadelphia Young Men's Hebrew Association that was established in 1875, and offers cultural and artistic events. In November 2018, the Gershman Y switched its focus to center exclusively on film.

Olivia Antsis is the executive artistic director of the festival, as of 2018. Kristen Evans is the executive managing director of the organization.

== History ==
The Philadelphia Jewish Film Festival was founded and co-directed by Archie Perlmutter in 1981. It is the second-oldest Jewish-specific film festival in the United States, after the San Francisco Jewish Film Festival.

Among other notable winners, Heading Home: The Tale of Team Israel won the Best Documentary Audience Award at the Philadelphia Jewish Film Festival CineMondays 2018, A Bag of Marbles won the Best Narrative Audience Award at the Philadelphia Jewish Film Festival 37, My Hero Brother won the Best Documentary Audience Award at the Philadelphia Jewish Film Festival 37, Fanny's Journey won the Best Narrative Audience Award at the Philadelphia Jewish Film Festival CineMondays 2017, The Origin of Violence won the Best Narrative Audience Award at the Philadelphia Jewish Film Festival 36, and The People vs. Fritz Bauer won the Best Documentary Audience Award at the Philadelphia Jewish Film Festival CineMondays 2016.

In November 2018 the festival had its 38th annual season. The festival took place over 19 days, showing 39 films from 12 countries in 11 theaters.
