= European Holocaust Research Infrastructure =

EU research project under the Framework Programmes

The European Holocaust Research Infrastructure (EHRI) is an international digital infrastructure and community. It is a joint undertaking of Holocaust historians, archivists, and specialists in digital humanities. Through the development of heritage archives into research infrastructures and by connecting the knowledge of heritage archives and making that knowledge relevant for research, EHRI aims to support Holocaust research, commemoration and education.

== Objective ==
EHRI’s objective is to support the Holocaust research community by building a digital infrastructure and facilitating human networks. The infrastructure deals with the wide dispersal of sources and expertise across many institutions by connecting sources, institutions and people. EHRI provides access to information about dispersed Holocaust-related sources through its Online Portal, as well as tools and methods that enable researchers and archivists to work collaboratively. Together with over twenty other organizations, EHRI digitalized Holocaust research to preserve it for indefinite future reference. It aims to have as many institutions as possible join in via standardized digital connections.

- EHRI's Vision: Integration of Holocaust archives and research.
- EHRI's Mission: Securing trans-national Holocaust research, commemoration and education.

== Projects ==
=== EHRI-1: 2010-2015 ===
The EHRI-1 project ran from October 2010 until March 2015. It received funding from the European Union under the Seventh Framework (FP7) Programme. Together with 19 partners from 13 countries and numerous associate partners, the EHRI-1 project aimed to support the European Holocaust research community. The project delivered the EHRI Portal, an online environment that can be used by both scholars and the general public to search Holocaust-related archival material. The portal hosts reports that provide per-country information about the Holocaust history and archival situation, research guides and other services.

=== EHRI-2: 2015-2019 ===
The EHRI-2 project ran from May 2015 to October 2019, and it was funded by the European Union under the Horizon 2020 Programme. Consisting of 24 partners from all over the globe, including institutions from European countries that are traditionally under-represented in the research field, the EHRI-2 project aimed to make previously inaccessible archival material accessible to both scholars and the general public. In 2018, the project was added to the European Strategy Forum for Research Infrastructures (ESFRI) Roadmap. The project concluded with the continual development of both the EHRI Portal (incorporating IRP2, the International Research Portal for Records Related to Nazi-Era Cultural Property) and the facilitation of the expanding Holocaust research community.

=== EHRI-PP: 2019-2022 ===
The EHRI Preparatory Phase (EHRI-PP) project ran from December 2019 to May 2025. The original end date was November 2022 but an extension was granted due to delays caused by COVID-19. Funded by the European Union under the Horizon 2020 Programme, this project was initiated to transform EHRI from a project into a permanent European research infrastructure and it focused on the legal, financial and strategic work necessary to establish an entity that would provide a continual service. Consisting of 15 partners from 13 countries, EHRI-PP aimed to secure the long-term future of trans-national Holocaust research.

=== EHRI-3: 2020-2024 ===
The EHRI-3 project ran from September 2020 to February 2025. The original end date was August 2022 but an extension was granted due to delays caused by COVID-19. The project was funded by the European Union under the Horizon 2020 Programme. Together with 25 partners from all over the globe, the third phase of EHRI aimed to deepen the integration of Holocaust archives by developing tools and protocols that grant access to archives that were inaccessible, in addition to further enhancing trans-national access via the portal. The project also focused on the integration of new communities and discussions about antisemitism, xenophobia, non-discrimination, and religious and cultural tolerance.

=== EHRI-IP: 2024-2026 ===
The EHRI Implementation Phase (EHRI-IP) project was initiated in February 2024 and it is scheduled to finish in January 2026. It is funded by the European Union under the Horizon Europe Programme. Complimenting the EHRI-PP project, the EHRI-IP project focuses on facilitating EHRI’s implementation phase and ensuring a timely start of its operation as an ERIC. Consisting of 14 partners from 13 countries, the EHRI-IP project aims to advance EHRI’s maturity and capabilities and remove any remaining roadblocks to its implementation and early operation.

== Services offered ==
EHRI offers a wide range of services to both the research community and the wider public, for example:

- The EHRI Portal, an online portal that aims to offer a single point of access to information on Holocaust-related archival material held in institutions across Europe and beyond.
- The EHRI Conny Kristel Fellowship, a fellowship program intended to support and stimulate Holocaust research by facilitating international access to key archives and collections.
- The EHRI Document Blog, a space to share ideas about Holocaust-related archival documents.
- The Online edition of Early Holocaust Testimony, a collection of samples of early testimonies of Jewish witnesses and survivors taken before the 1960s.
- EHRI Online Courses, courses aimed at diverse user groups, ranging from scholars, educators, people active in Holocaust commemoration, archivists, and many more.
- Various seminars, conferences and workshops

== Partners ==
EHRI has 27 partners, representing archives, libraries, museums and research institutions.

KNAW-NIOD Institute for War, Holocaust and Genocide Studies KNAW-DANS Data Archiving and Networked Services	The Netherlands
Belgian State Archives/CegeSoma	Belgium
Masaryk Institute and Archives of the Czech Academy of Sciences	Czech Republic
Yad Vashem, the World Holocaust Remembrance Center	Israel
Center for Holocaust Studies at the Leibniz Institute for Contemporary History	Germany
King's College London	The United Kingdom
Dokumentačné Stredisko Holokaustu	Slovakia
Kazerne Dossin: Memorial, Museum and Research Centre on Holocaust and Human Rights	Belgium
The Wiener Holocaust Library	The United Kingdom
Elie Wiesel National Institute for the Study of the Holocaust	Romania
Wiener Wiesenthal Institut für Holocaust-Studien (VWI)	Austria
Shoah Memorial	France
Emanuel Ringelblum Jewish Historical Institute	Poland
United States Holocaust Memorial Museum	The United States of America
National Research Council (CNR)	Italy
Arolsen Archives Bad Arolsen	Germany
Bundesarchiv	Germany
INRIA Institute for Research in Computer Science and Automation	France
Polish Center for Holocaust Research Association	Poland
Foundation Jewish Contemporary Documentation Center CDEC	Italy
Aristotle University of Thessaloniki	Greece
Vilna Gaon Museum of Jewish History	Lithuania
Hungarian Jewish Museum and Archives	Hungary
Center for Urban History of East Central Europe	Ukraine
Jewish Museum in Prague	Czech Republic
The Jewish Museum of Greece	Greece
University of Zagreb, Faculty of Humanities and Social Sciences	Croatia

== Type of organization ==
Initially project based, the European Holocaust Research Infrastructure became a European Research Infrastructure Consortium (ERIC) in January 2025.

Published literature on EHRI can be found on the EHRI bibliography page.
