= Beit Terezin =

Holocaust museum and research center

Coordinates: 32.3975°N 34.9325°E

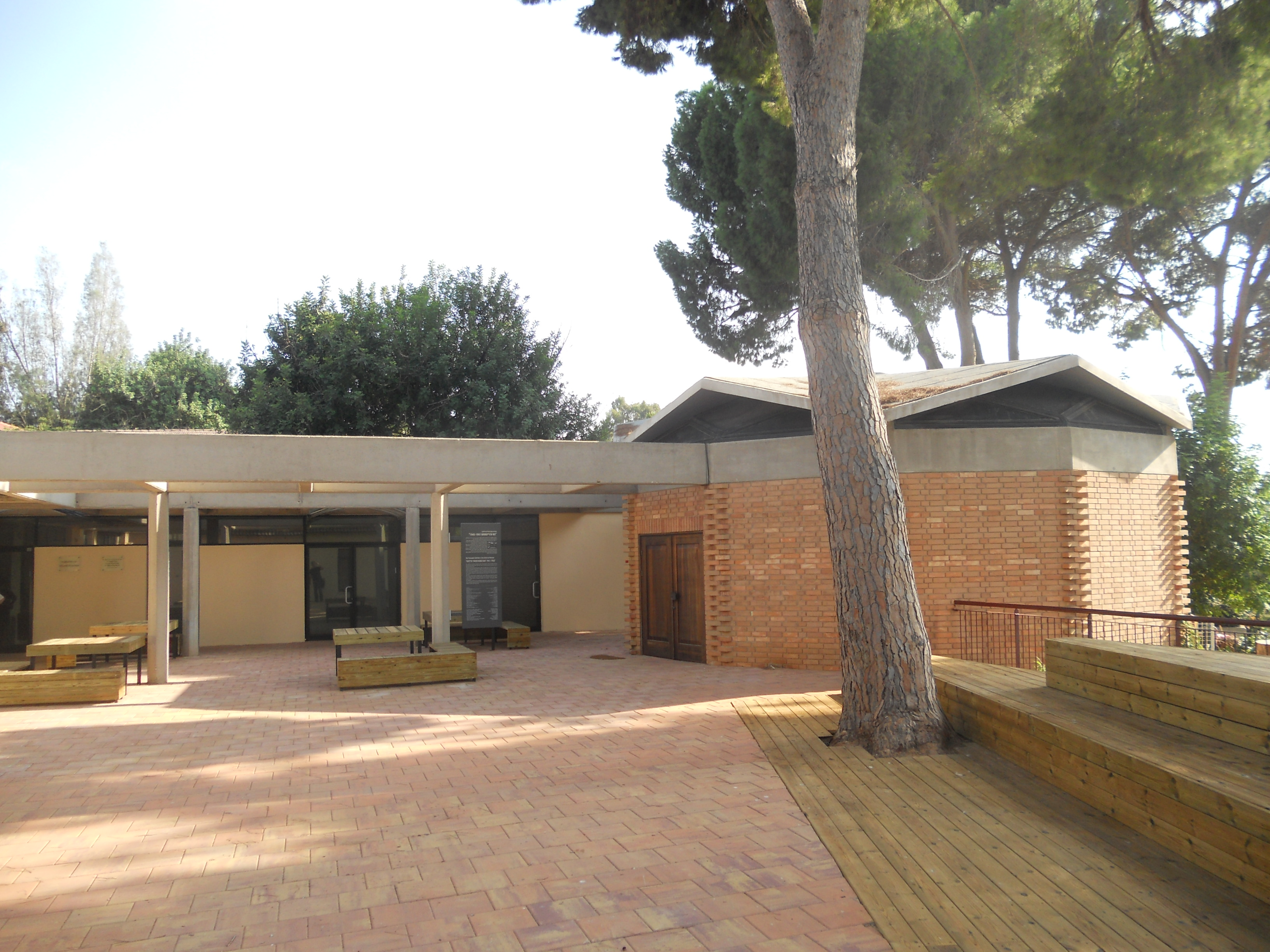
Beit Terezin, exterior view, right the rotunda

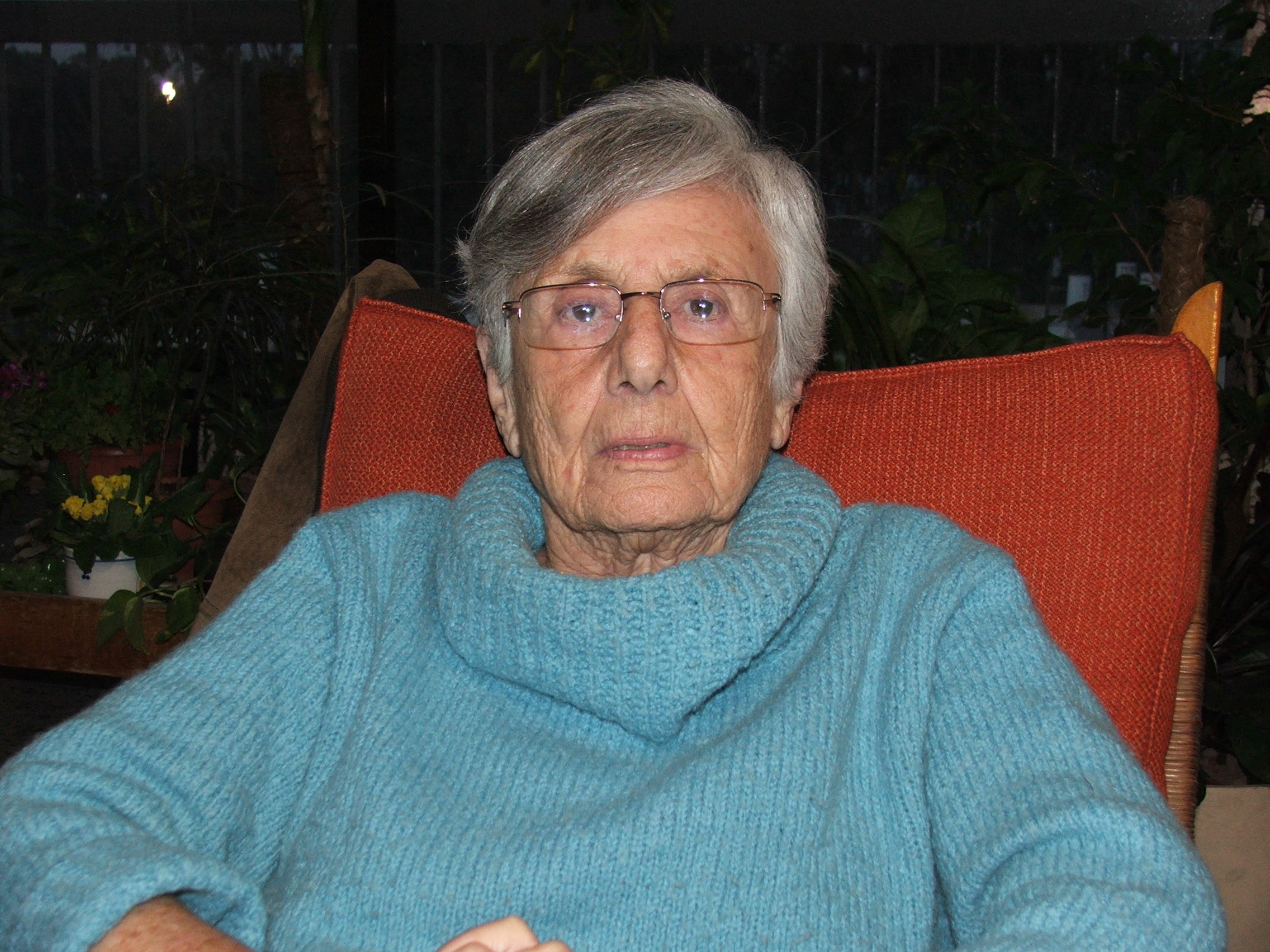
Ruth Bondy, co-founder of Beit Terezin, 2008

Beit Terezin or Beit Theresienstadt (German: Haus Theresienstadt) is a research and educational institution that opened in 1975 in Kibbutz Givat Haim (Ihud), a museum and a place of remembrance of the victims of Nazi Germany persecution at the Theresienstadt concentration camp.

== Founding ==
In May 1955, a first informal meeting of survivors of the Theresienstadt concentration camp took place in Israel, the participants of which decided to found an educational institution. In 1966 the Association was formed to commemorate the martyrs of Theresienstadt, whose members were former prisoners of the Theresienstadt concentration camp now living in Israel, including former members of Zionist youth organisations. The association did not only aim at meetings of the survivors, but also at the founding of an educational institution. This institution was to keep the memory of the murdered alive, especially that of the victims of the HeHalutz and their leading member Jacob Edelstein, the first Judenrat of the Theresienstadt ghetto.

One motivation for setting up Beit Terezin was that the communist government of Czechoslovakia avoided commemorating the Holocaust. Therefore the Theresienstadt Small Fortress became a national memorial for the victims of fascism, but neither here nor on the commemorative plaque in the city were the murdered Jews explicitly mentioned. The Pinkas Synagogue in Prague, which served as the national memorial site for the murdered Jews of Czechoslovakia from 1960 to 1968, had not been open since the Prague Spring of 1968.

In its first meetings, the preparatory committee dealt with fundamental questions such as the opening of the association for all survivors of the Theresienstadt concentration camp or only for the members of Hechaluz. A further question was whether only the victims who died in Theresienstadt or those who were murdered in other camps after imprisonment in Theresienstadt should be remembered here. In 1966, when the Association for the Remembrance of the Martyrs of Theresienstadt was formally recognised, the members met in cafés or in the offices of members who had access to suitable rooms due to their professional activities. It was agreed that there was an urgent need for rooms for meetings, commemorations, and for the storage of documents and research documents.

In the mid-1960s many survivors of the Theresienstadt concentration camp lived in Kibbutz Givat Haim (Ihud). In addition, many Jews from Germany and Austria and members of the Zionist youth organisations, who had often lost relatives in Theresienstadt, were among the founders of the Kibbutz. This group of people was benevolent towards the establishment of a memorial or educational institution on the land of the kibbutz. In addition, it was the wish of the Association that Beit Terezin be established in the midst of a living community and not far from civilization. The choice of the Kibbutz Givat Haim (Ihud) was additionally favoured by its central location - at that time only a few of the members of the association scattered all over Israel had a motor vehicle, most of them relying on public transportation. After all, Jakob Edelstein, who was generally revered and murdered in the Auschwitz concentration camp, wanted to settle in the then undivided Kibbutz Givat Haim after emigrating to Palestine. Because the kibbutz was to use rooms in Beit Terezin for its own cultural events from the very beginning, the association was assigned a building site in the middle of the kibbutz.

Founding members of the association were the Israeli journalist and translator Ruth Bondy, a survivor of the Holocaust and former prisoner of the Theresienstadt concentration camp and several other concentration camps, and the diplomat Zeev Shek, also a survivor of Theresienstadt, Auschwitz and the Kaufering remote camp of the Dachau concentration camp. Shek later became Israeli ambassador to Austria.

The foundation stone was laid in 1969 and the buildings were constructed with the support of Zionist youth organisations. Beit Terezin was opened at the beginning of May 1975 on the 30th anniversary of the liberation of the Theresienstadt concentration camp by the Red Army. At this time the facility was far from complete. Therefore the memorial hall consisted only of a floor mosaic and a torah, the walls were bare. There were proposals for a modern audiovisual presentation of the ghetto's history, but the available financial means ruled it out. Following a suggestion by Albin Glaser, backlit transparencies with accompanying texts were attached to the walls to illustrate the development of the ghetto. It took until 1974 to bring the exhibition to its desired Display.

== Buildings ==
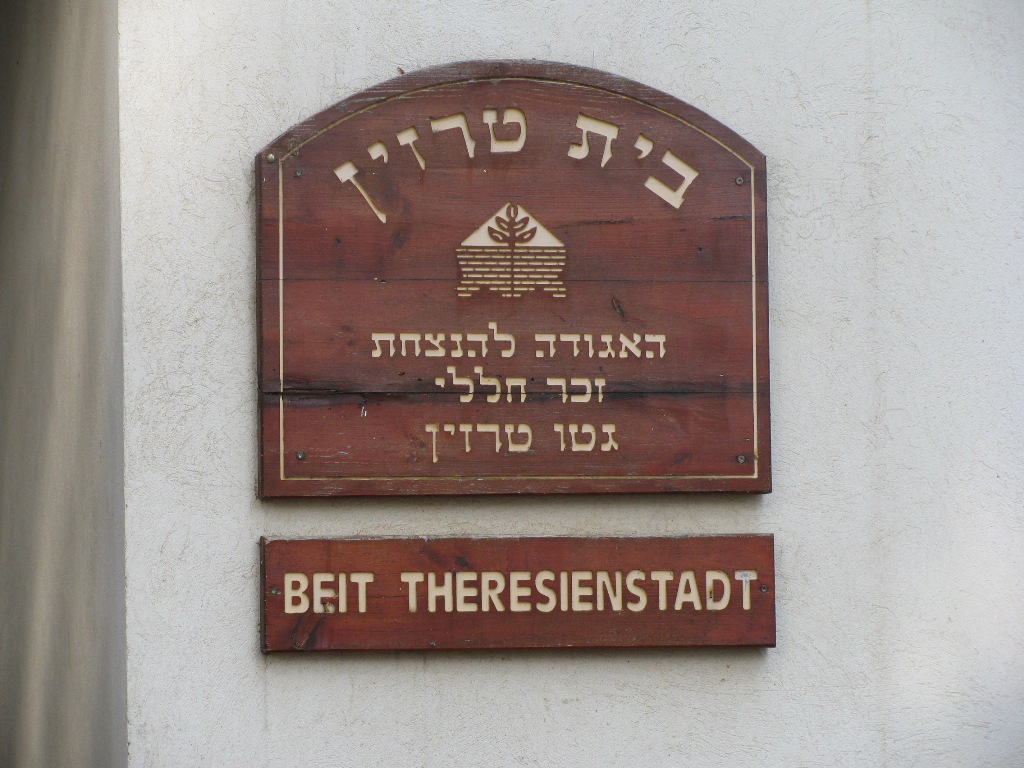
Sign at the entrance of Beit Terezin

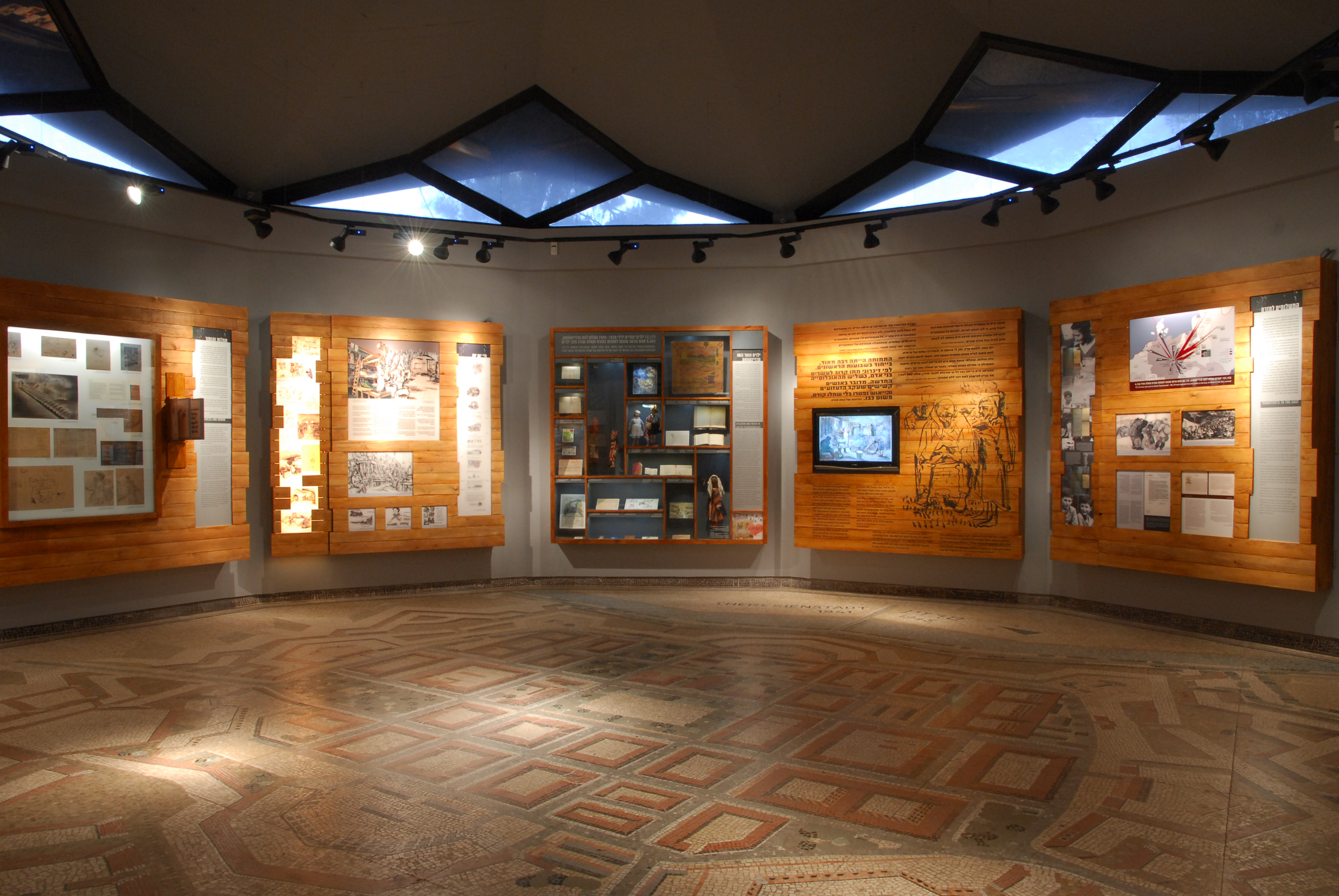
Interior view of the Rotunda

Beit Terezin's planning had to take into account the limited financial means of the association in memory of the martyrs of Theresienstadt. The design of the complex was developed by the architect Albin Glaser, himself a survivor of the Theresienstadt concentration camp. His design is an interior in simple architecture, the rooms of which can be used for a variety of purposes. The central element is the twelve-sided rotunda made of reddish-brown bricks, whose ground plan and material are intended to remind us of the Theresienstadt fortress, which originally served as a memorial hall and place of remembrance. Today it is the main room of the Beit Theresienstadt Museum and the core of Beit Terezin with its permanent exhibition.

For use by the Kibbutz, a library with a reading room and a small hall for lectures and cultural events were built. For Beit Terezin itself, the complex includes an archive, a reading room and a lecture hall.

Glaser's original planning included a building to house the documents about the Theresienstadt concentration camp that Zeev Shek had compiled in Prague immediately after the Second World War on behalf of the Jewish Agency for Israel and brought to Israel. These documents were initially housed for years at the Hebrew University of Jerusalem and were to form the basis of the Beit Terezin archive. At the instigation of the then Israeli Foreign Minister Moshe Sharett, whose secretary was Zeev Shek at the time, the documents on the Holocaust were not to be distributed among many small institutions, but stored centrally. Therefore, Shek handed the documents over to Yad Vashem. The resulting renunciation of a documentation and study center led to a dispute within the association. In the end, smaller premises were created to house the archive, without competing in any way with Yad Vashem or other large institutions.

A second conflict over the design of Beit Terezin concerned the floor mosaic of the rotunda planned by Glaser. The design depicted the path network and the buildings of the Theresienstadt ghetto and its realisation cost IL100,000. Within the association the costs were criticized, some members saw the amount better invested in education and research. In addition to the financial aspect, it was argued that the visual representation would be understood only by the survivors of the ghetto, while other members were convinced that the detailed representation of the ghetto's streets, paths, and buildings would preserve the atmosphere of oppression for future generations. Finally, the mosaics were made according to Glaser's design in Kibbutz Givat HaShlosha, and the design is generally accepted.

== Exhibitions ==
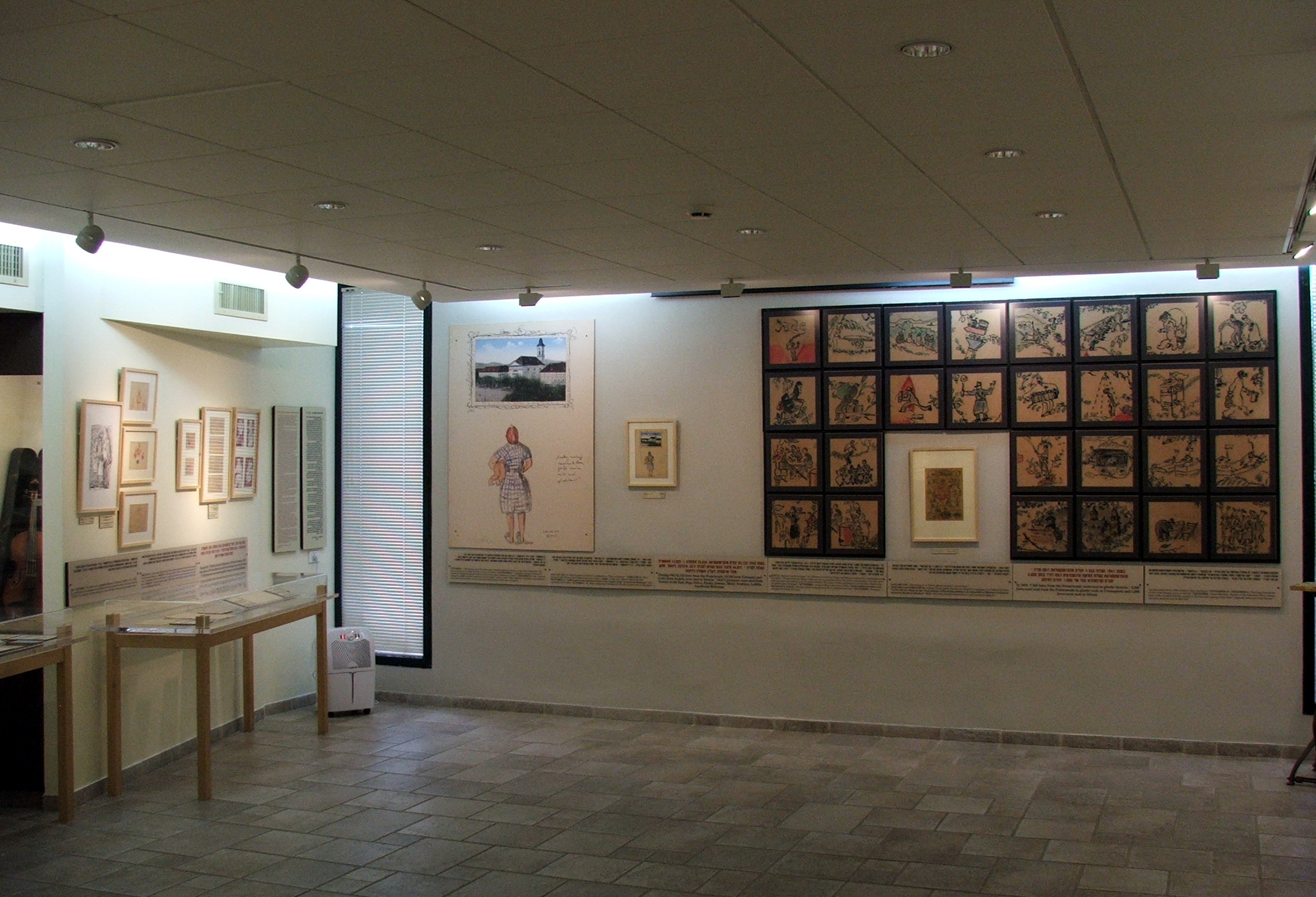
Exhibition room of Bei Terezin with children's drawings

The theme of the permanent exhibition is the occupation of the Czech Republic by National Socialist Germany from 1939 to 1945, in particular the history of the Jews in the Theresienstadt Ghetto from November 1941 to May 1945. Other exhibitions include works by artists from the ghetto.

In 2009, a special exhibition on the Theresienstadt football league was prepared under the title Liga Terezín. Oded Breda, then director of Beit Terezin, supported director Michael Schwartz and cameraman Avi Kanner in the production of their documentary film Liga Terezín from 2013, in which they tell the story of the football matches in the Theresienstadt concentration camp. Also with the support of Beit Terezin, the German Football Museum, opened in 2015, created part of the permanent exhibition in memory of the Theresienstadt football league and Julius Hirsch and other persecuted and murdered Jewish footballers.

Beit Terezin has created two exhibitions that are particularly aimed at children and young people. The first exhibition, entitled "They called him a friend", deals with the children's magazine "Kamarád" of the Theresienstadt concentration camp, in which contributions written or drawn by children about their everyday experiences with hunger, death, illness, dirt and overcrowding of the camp were published. In addition to the description of the magazine with exhibits, the fates of the authors up to their murder in the Auschwitz concentration camp are presented. A second exhibition is entitled "Sport and Youth in Theresienstadt". The exhibition is dedicated to the many sporting activities of children and young people in the concentration camp and refers in particular to the importance of sport for the education and value education of young prisoners.

In 2011 Beit Terezin was accredited as the 54th Museum and Third Holocaust Museum of the State of Israel.

== Educational center ==
The Beit Terezin Education Centre was opened in 1993 and is dedicated to researching and documenting the Holocaust. For this purpose, events and seminars are offered for pupils of all ages. Other seminars are aimed at students of various disciplines, members of the Israel Defence Forces, teachers and other multipliers and pensioners.

The topics dealt with in the events include the history and fate of Central European Jewry, the measures to establish the ghetto and the "final solution", the internal resistance, the function of sport in the camp, the maintenance of educational institutions under the most difficult circumstances, art as a means of survival and more.

Beit Terezin organizes the Annual Hana Greenfield Writing Competition, an annual writing competition for young people named after Hana Greenfield, an Israeli writer and survivor of the concentration camps Theresienstadt, Auschwitz and Bergen-Belsen

== Archives ==
The Beit Terezin archive is one of the four most important archives with material on the Theresienstadt concentration camp, along with the archives of Yad Vashem, the Jewish Museum in Prague and the archive of the Theresienstadt Memorial. Numerous archival materials come from the private collections of survivors, including diaries, photographs, materials for school lessons in the concentration camp, pictures and other works of art.

Numerous documents were donated to the Beit Terezin archive. Thanks to his good contacts, Zeev Shek was able to obtain a copy of an index containing the data of more than 162,000 Jewish prisoners of the Theresienstadt concentration camp from Czechoslovakia, Germany, Austria, the Netherlands, Denmark and other European countries. The index was produced in Prague immediately after the Second World War. This index was invaluable during the Cold War, especially since the Czechoslovak government had broken off diplomatic relations and severely restricted the exchange of information after Israel's victory in the Six-Day War in 1967, as had all the Eastern bloc states. This index forms the core of Beit Terezin's archive and information about the fate of missing persons is still provided to their relatives upon request.

In addition to the aforementioned index, Shek succeeded in taking the archives of Hechaluz Theresienstadt to Palestine. He initially handed the material over to the Central Archives for the History of the Jewish People, most of which was handed over to Yad Vashem in 1976. Extensive photographic material from this collection is in the Beit Terezin archive.

== Staff ==
In the early years almost all the work, from the construction of Beit Terezin, the administration, the guided tours through the exhibition to the educational events, was carried out by volunteers. In most cases these were survivors of the Theresienstadt concentration camp, and to a lesser extent residents of the kibbutz and other volunteers. The administration of the Kibbutz Givat Haim (Ihud) assigned Pinda Shefa (until 1982) and Aliza Schiller (until 1998), two members of the Kibbutz and Theresienstadt survivors, to run Beit Terezin. The age and deaths of the members of the first generation and the steadily increasing workload made it necessary to fill the management of Beit Terezin full-time from 1998. Today, permanent staff are employed for various tasks in the museum, educational sector and archive.

== Sponsoring association ==
Beit Terezin is still under the auspices of the Association for the Remembrance of the Martyrs of Theresienstadt (Theresienstadt (Terezin) Martyrs Remembrance Association). In the beginning, the association was made up of survivors of the Theresienstadt concentration camp. However, the association gradually opened up, first by welcoming the "second generation", children of survivors born after the liberation of their parents. In 1997, the statutes of the association established the representation of the "second generation" in all committees of the association. Today any member who is willing to support the work and goals of Beit Terezin can become a member.

== Newsletter Dapei Kesher ==
Since 1976, Beit Terezin has published the semi-annual newsletter Dapei Kesher. The purpose of this publication is to maintain contact and exchange information about Beit Terezin between members of the (Terezin) Martyrs Remembrance Association spread all over the world. Further contents refer to the history of the Theresienstadt concentration camp, with information on meetings of survivors, congresses, exhibitions, cultural events, publications of books and media from all over the world. Since the first editions publication, the Dapei Kesher was published by Ruth Bondy for more than 20 years.
