= Yonatan Nir =

Israeli documentary film director and producer

- יונתן ניר
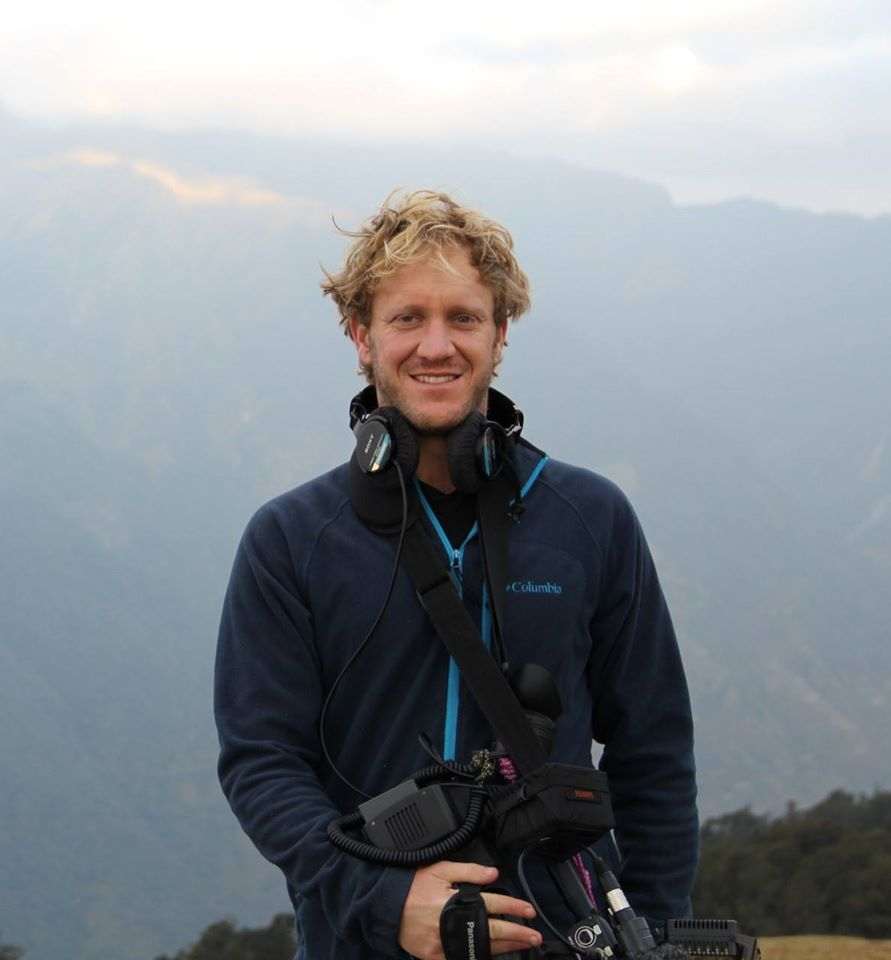
- Born: Kibbutz HaZore'a, Israel
- Occupations: Film producer, film director
- Years active: 2004–present

Yonatan Nir (Hebrew: יונתן ניר) is an Israeli documentary film director and producer and a former photojournalist.

Among the films he created are: "Dolphin Boy", "Cutting the Pain", The Essential Link: The Story of Wilfrid Israel, My Hero Brother, "Picture of His Life" and "Alex's Group".

== Biography ==
Yonatan Nir grew up in Kibbutz HaZore'a, in Northern Israel. He served in an elite commando unit, and was injured during the 2006 Lebanon War, in which he participated as a reserve soldier. This experience led him to take an interest in post-trauma and rehabilitation; recurring themes in his films.

Nir began his professional career as an underwater photographer and photojournalist, working for a number of media outlets including Haaretz, Yedioth Ahronoth and Asian Geographic. Nir is a graduate of the Camera Obscura School of Art in Tel Aviv, where he specialized in film and television.

Nir co-produced and co-directed his debut film Dolphin Boy (2011), together with Dani Menkin. The film’s remake rights were acquired by Disney Pictures in 2012.

Nir’s films have won several awards, including Best Documentary Film Award and Audience Choice Award at the Santa Barbara International Film Festival, Honorary Mention Award at the Woodstock Film Festival, and Best International Director Award at the Documentary Edge Festival in New Zealand.

Nir has given over 1,200 lectures around the world. In January 2020 he spoke at TEDxSavyon about docutherapy and the power of film in post-traumatic growth. Nir resides in Kibbutz Ramot Menashe with his wife and three daughters.

== Filmography ==
Dolphin Boy (2011) - tells the story of Morad, a boy who undergoes 3 years of dolphin therapy in Eilat, after being attacked and suffering from post-traumatic stress disorder.

My Hero Brother (2016) - tells the story of a group of young people with Down syndrome that set on a journey to the summit of the Himalayas with their siblings.

The Essential Link: The Story of Wilfrid Israel (2017) - tells the story of a wealthy Jewish businessman and owner of Berlin’s largest department store in the 1930s, who was involved in saving 20,000 Jews during World War II.

Picture of His Life (2019) - tells the story of Amos Nachoum, a wildlife photographer with one final photographic dream remaining: to photograph a polar bear underwater, while swimming alongside it.

Additional films include Beyond the Boundaries and Cutting the Pain.

== Awards ==
Dolphin Boy:

- 2011 Jerusalem Film Festival - Special Mention Award
- 2011 Israeli Academy Awards - Final Nominee
- 2011 Mind Media Awards - Final Nominee
- 2012 Woodstock International Film Festival - Special Mention Award
- 2012 Washington Jewish Film Festival - Audience Award
- 2012 Brooklyn Israel Film Festival - Audience Award
- 2012 Dayton Jewish International Film Festival - Audience Award
- 2012 Cinema for Peace Awards – Final Nominee
- 2012 Marseille Underwater Film Festival - Best Documentary Award
- 2012 Millennium Film Festival - Audience Award

My Hero Brother:

- 2017 Santa Barbara International Film Festival - Best Documentary Film Award
- 2017 Santa Barbara International Film Festival - Audience Choice Award
- 2017 Doc Edge International Film Festival - Best International Director Award
- 2017 Wasatch Mountain Film Festival - Social Awareness Award
- 2017 Cherry Hill Jewish Film Festival - Audience Award
- 2017 Jewish Arts & Film Festival of Fairfield County - Audience Choice Award
- 2018 Bosifest Film Festival - Special Mention Award
- 2018 Philadelphia Jewish Film Festival - Audience Award
- 2018 Carpentras Israeli Film Festival - Best Documentary Award
- 2018 International Breaking Down Barriers Film Festival - Best Film About Love Award
- 2019 Entr'2 Marches International Film Festival - Georges Lautner Audience Award

The Essential Link: The Story of Wilfrid Israel:

- 2018 Philadelphia Jewish Film Festival - Audience Award
- 2018 New Hampshire Jewish Film Festival - Audience Award

Picture of His Life:

- 2019 Syracuse International Film Festival - Audience Choice Award
- 2019 Gold Coast International Film Festival - Best Documentary Film Award
- 2019 Gold Coast International Film Festival - Audience Choice Award
- 2019 San Francisco Jewish Film Festival - Audience Choice Award
- 2019 Israel Film Festival, Los Angeles - Best Documentary Film Award
- 2019 Chicago Festival of Israeli Cinema - Audience Choice Award
- 2021 Frozen River Film Festival - Jury Award
- 2021 Durango Independent Film Festival - Audience Award for Best Documentary Film

Photography Awards:

- 2009 Asian Geographic Best of the Decade Award for Photojournalism
