= George Ogilvie-Forbes =

British diplomat (1891–1954)

Sir George Ogilvie-Forbes KCMG

Personal details
- Born: George Arthur Drostan Ogilvie-Forbes; 16 December 1891 Edinburgh, Scotland
- Died: 10 July 1954 (aged 62) Boyndlie, Aberdeenshire, Scotland

Sir George Arthur Drostan Ogilvie-Forbes KCMG (6 December 1891 – 10 July 1954) was a British diplomat who held two key postings in the years leading up to the Second World War, as chargé d'affaires in Madrid and Valencia 1936 to 1937 and as counsellor and chargé d'affaires in Berlin from 1937 to 1939. He was known for his humanitarian efforts in both positions. In 2008, his name was included on a plaque in the Foreign and Commonwealth Office, London commemorating seven British diplomats "who by their personal endeavours helped to rescue victims of Nazi racial policy". In 2018, he was a posthumous recipient of the British Hero of the Holocaust award.

== Early life ==
Ogilvie-Forbes was born on 6 December 1891 in Edinburgh, son of an Aberdeenshire landowner. He was educated at The Oratory School, Beaumont College, Bonn University and New College, Oxford. At Bonn, Ogilvie-Forbes studied modern languages, becoming fluent in French and German. In 1914 he joined the Scottish Horse Yeomanry, was wounded at Gallipoli and twice mentioned in Dispatches. In 1916 he was promoted to captain and became ADC to Lieutenant General Sir Stanley Maude the Commander-in-Chief, Mesopotamia and served on the General Staff.

== Early diplomatic career ==
Ogilvie-Forbes joined HM Diplomatic Service in 1919 and early postings included Denmark, Finland, Yugoslavia and Mexico (1927–30). Ogilvie-Forbes served as the chargé d'affaires to the Holy See (1930–32) and then as Counsellor to Embassy in Baghdad (1932–35). Ogilvie-Forbes was described as a "brilliant diplomat" who was a favourite protege of Sir Robert Vansittart, the Permanent Undersecretary at the Foreign Office 1930–37.

== Spain 1936–1937 ==
At the outbreak of the civil war in July 1936 several embassies, including the British, evacuated to Hendaye. Ogilvie-Forbes was appointed chargé d'affaires in Madrid, which was then a war zone governed by the Republicans. The British ambassador, Sir Henry Chilton, chose not to return to Madrid, which he regarded as too dangerous. Ogilvie-Forbes was on vacation in Scotland when the war began, but he chose to return to Madrid, and as the most senior British diplomat took charge of the embassy. Upon landing in Spain, he was provided with ammunition for his revolver, and arrived in Madrid on 15 August 1936.

British policy during the Spanish Civil War was officially that of non-intervention, but many believed at the time that this was a false image and subsequent opening of official records has shown the British government's support for Franco from the start. In contrast to this, Ogilvie-Forbes set out firstly to be as impartial as possible, and secondly to cultivate good relations with the differing factions within the Republican side because of the opportunity it provided for humanitarian aid and assistance to refugees from both sides of the conflict. The appointment of the devout Roman Catholic Ogilvie-Forbes led to charges by left-wing journalists that he was pro-Nationalist, but his impartiality and humanitarianism soon silenced these claims. The Spanish Foreign Minister, the Socialist Julio Álvarez del Vayo later recalled in his exile that Ogilvie-Forbes was intelligent man with "strong human kindness", who despite the fact that Roman Catholic Church had blessed Franco's "crusade against Communism", did his best to be neutral.

Ogilvie-Forbes witnessed first hand the terror waged by Spanish Communists and anarchists against the right in Madrid, but predicted if the Spanish Nationalists won the civil war, then the terror from the right against the left would be even worse. During his four and a half months running the embassy in Madrid the city was torn by the violence of the chaotic reign of terror within and the shelling by the Spanish Nationalist's army from the outside. On 28 August, he reported that there was an average of 70 murders per night by the Communists with the public being encouraged to view the bodies displayed as "like the game in a shooting party". In October–November 1936, the Nationalist Army advanced up to the gates of Madrid, and on 7 November the Spanish government moved to Valencia. As a prelude to the assault on the city that began in December, Madrid was bombed daily, and which led Ogilive-Forbes to complain of the "wanton cruelty" of the Nationalists whose "terror bombing" killed innocent civilians. During this period of extreme stress, Ogilvie-Forbes engaged in his favorite pastime of playing his bagpipes to ease his nerves.

The historian Tom Buchanan wrote of Ogilvie-Forbes: "He had no interest in the competing ideologies in Spain … and never lost sight of the fact that the conflict represented above all, private suffering on an immense scale which it was within his power – in however small a way – to mitigate." As the face of Britain in war-torn Madrid, many journalists met him and came to like the "jovial, compassionate, bag-pipe playing Scotsman, who kept the embassy against the odds, and who refused to serve a full Christmas dinner while madrileños went hungry". Towards the end of 1936 the Foreign Office was keen for Ogilvie-Forbes to close the embassy in Madrid, whilst acknowledging "that in the present welter of agony he feels a personal call to continue as long as possible his work of mercy, and that he cannot leave without doing violence to his conscience." On 1 January 1937 after the Republican government moved out of Madrid, Ogilvie-Forbes was instructed to move the Embassy to Valencia. Ogilvie-Forbes thought the order to move the embassy from Madrid to Valencia was "cowardly and dishonourable". Soon after that he was appointed as Counsellor to the British Embassy in Berlin.

By January 1937 British officials had helped in the evacuation of some 17,000 refugees. When Ogilvie-Forbes received his KCMG in May 1937 for his services in Spain, he pointed out in a letter to Anthony Eden that it was in recognition of all his colleagues who had helped him in Spain "often in terribly cruel circumstances". During this period, Ogilvie-Forbes exchanged letters on a weekly basis with Vansittart, who kept him well informed of developments in Germany.

== Berlin 1937–1939 ==
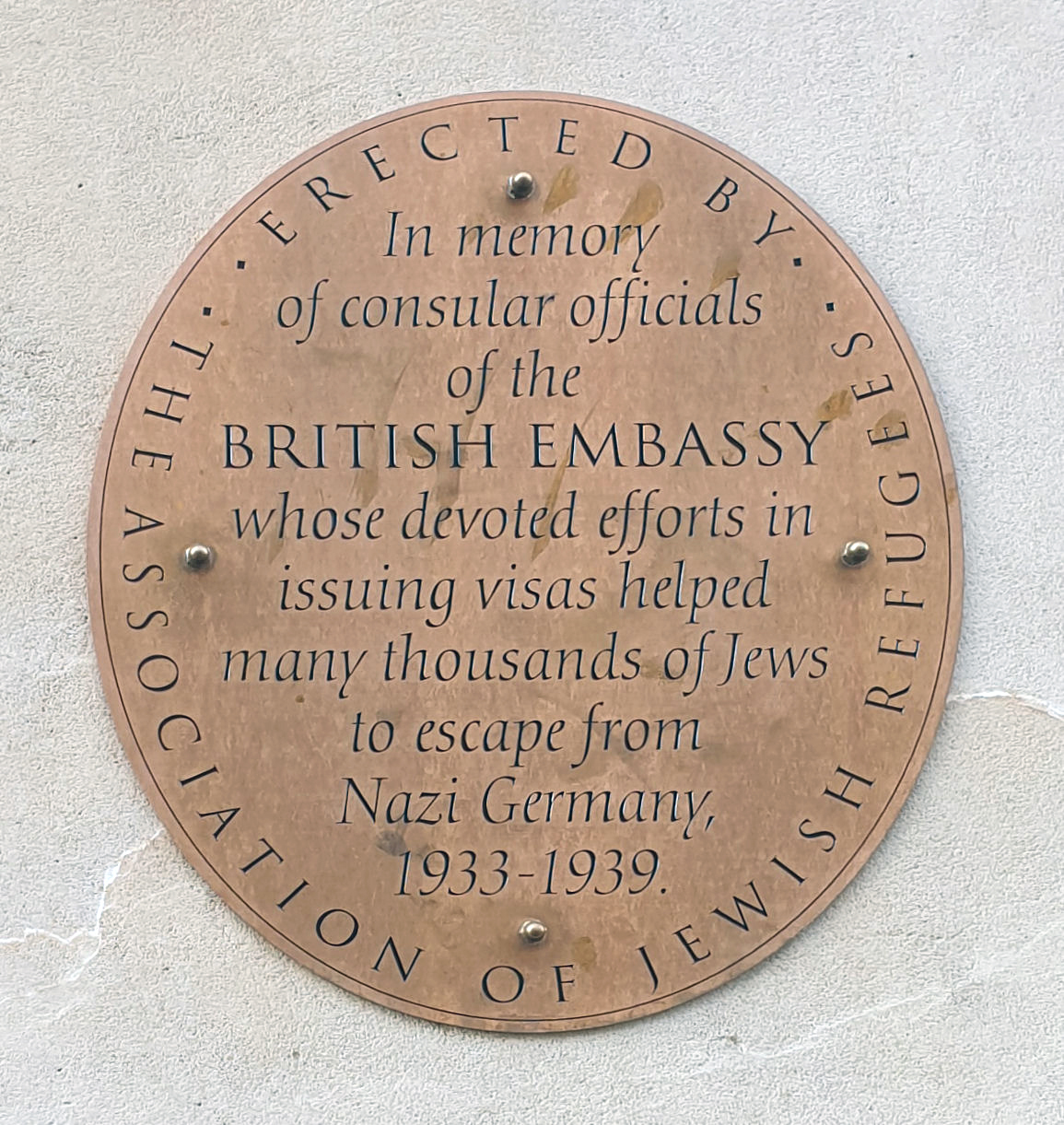
Plaque at the Embassy of the United Kingdom, Berlin, unveiled in 2020 by the Association of Jewish Refugees to honour the consular officials at the embassy

Ogilvie-Forbes was appointed Counsellor to the Embassy in Berlin in early April 1937. Sir Nevile Henderson, the new ambassador, arrived shortly afterwards. It was unusual to replace an ambassador and his second-in-command at the same time especially in an embassy of such significance. Ogilvie-Forbes and Henderson had differing attitudes towards Hitler and the Nazi regime, and their personal relationship was strained from the start. Ogilvie-Forbes wrote that Henderson was "rude and domineering". In the various degrees of approach to Appeasement, Henderson certainly shared the views of Neville Chamberlain, and as far as possible he dealt with Chamberlain directly, regularly bypassing the Foreign Office. Henderson was appointed in the hope that he might befriend Hitler and thus help to moderate the latter's behaviour towards Britain. As late as February 1939 Henderson wrote "If we handle him (Hitler) right, my belief is that he will become gradually more pacific. But if we treat him as a pariah or mad dog we shall turn him irrevocably into one". From August 1937 onward, in the power struggle that developed between Henderson and Vansittart, Ogilvie-Forbes tended to back the latter, which made relations with the former very difficult. On 14 September 1938, Ogilvie-Forbes warned Ernst von Weizsäcker, the State Secretary of the Auswärtiges Amt, that the proposal of Neville Chamberlain to allow the Sudetenland to be incorporated into the Reich showed how far Britain was willing to go to save the peace, but if Germany kept up its current negative attitude, then the result would be war. In speaking to Weizsäcker, Ogilvie-Forbes was saying essentially the same thing as Henderson, but in far stronger and blunter language.

In October 1938, Ogilive-Forbes wrote to Sir Oliver Harvey, the Principal Private Secretary to the Foreign Secretary, Lord Halifax: "In the major political business of this Embassy I have always been ignored. My views or participation are neither asked for nor wanted nor do I see the papers (and by no means all of them) until long after action. It is also very difficult to work for one who is so often excited, rude and domineering over trivial and [sensitive? (text unclear)] matters and all the more discouraging because I have been constantly loyal to both his personality and his policy, as is my duty."

By mid 1938 it was clear that Henderson was a very sick man, and in October he had to return to London and take five months leave for treatment for the cancer from which he died in 1942. During this time Ogilvie-Forbes was in charge of the Embassy. He had a much more pessimistic view of Hitler than Henderson and this was reflected in his dispatches back to the Foreign Office. Ogilvie-Forbes shared the widespread feeling in Britain that the Treaty of Versailles had been too harsh on Germany and he had supported the Munich Agreement on the grounds that the Sudetenland should never have been included in Czechoslovakia in the first place. However, unlike Henderson, Ogilvie-Forbes believed that the Nazi regime had foreign policy goals that went well beyond revising the Treaty of Versailles and were aimed at winning Germany the "world power status" that she had sought in the First World War.

In the work involving the implementation of the Munich Agreement as a joint Anglo-German-Franco-Italo commission had the task of deciding what districts of the Sudetenland were to join Germany, Ogilvie-Forbes became increasingly tired "of the Germans' arrogant and dictatorial actions, and their blatant disregard for the letter and spirit of Munich." On 11 October 1938, in one of his last instructions before he left Berlin, Henderson ordered Ogilvie-Forbes to accept the German definition of where the new German-Czechoslovak frontier should be, adding in that he hoped "that the Slovaks [would] stick it to the Czechs". Ogilvie-Forbes by contrast tried as much as possible to include majority Czech districts within Czecho-Slovakia as Czechoslovakia was renamed. By 26 October 1938, Ogilvie-Forbes had counted over 300 violations of the Munich Agreement as the Germans sought to claim districts of the Sudetenland that were, in fact, majority Czech with the aim of making Czecho-Slovakia economically nonviable. He complained that the frontier claimed by the Germans was "cunningly" drawn to cause economic chaos as "almost all of the main arteries of Bohemia and Moravia must now traverse territory occupied by the Germans". As the Sudetenland was turned over in stages to Germany in October–November 1938, Ogilvie-Forbes complained that the German authorities were expelling Jews from the Sudetenland in violation of the Munich Agreement, which stated all of the people living in the Sudetenland had the right to stay. On 17 November 1938, Weizsäcker presented Ogilvie-Forbes with a quasi-ultimatum claiming a district of Czecho-Slovakia which as the latter noted as "populated by about 6,000 Germans and 50,000 Czechs". Ogilvie-Forbes wrote that to agree to this "would appear to be truckling to an unreasonable demand and out of accord with the terms and the spirit of the Munich agreement" while also writing "to refuse would be regarded by the Germans as contrary to His Majesty's Government's policy of Anglo-German rapprochement as recorded at Munich". The Foreign Secretary, Halifax, ordered Ogilvie-Forbes to accept the German demand despite the way it clearly violated the Munich agreement, which stated that only districts of the Sudetenland that were 50% ethnically German or more based on the outdated Austrian census of 1910 (rather than the more recent Czechoslovak census of 1930) were to go to Germany.

In the months that followed, his appraisal of the situation was bleak, emphasising that Hitler could not be trusted and "had unlimited aims of world domination and an 'insensate' hatred of Britain... that appeasement could never succeed... that the German economy was solely directed towards military ends... and Hitler could only be removed after a military defeat, Britain would have to choose between war and surrender." He could see no possibility at all of Göring (whom he knew personally) leading a movement against the Führer, and dismissed the idea of an internal German revolt to overthrow the Nazis. On 21 October 1938, Ogilvie-Forbes attended a speech by the Propaganda minister Joseph Goebbels in Hamburg, which he summarised as: "filled with a glorification of force and of its successful employment by the Nationalist-Socialist leadership."

It has been argued by the Canadian historian Bruce Strang, that during the time of Henderson's absence, Ogilvie-Forbes, was able to have a significant effect on British Foreign policy, as he wrote: "It was not a coincidence that the decisive turn in the Cabinet's perception of Hitler occurred while Sir George Ogilvie-Forbes temporarily headed the Berlin Embassy, as he helped to undermine Chamberlain's often inaccurate views, and to create the climate of moral revulsion and the heightened sense of danger in which the Cabinet operated."

This "moral revulsion" was perhaps most keenly conveyed by the barrage of strongly worded reports concerning the plight of the Jews in Germany sent by Ogilvie-Forbes. In a letter to Halifax after Kristallnacht (10 November 1938), Ogilvie-Forbes described how he and members of his staff witnessed the looting and destruction of Jewish property. The attacks, he wrote, started at a given hour, targeted with uncanny precision Jewish shops and buildings and ended on the word of Goebbels who condoned what had been done. Towards the end of his letter Ogilvie-Forbes wrote "I think the murder of Herr vom Rath by a German born Polish Jew has only accelerated the elimination of the Jews which has for long been planned... It has let loose the forces of mediaeval barbarism... I can find no words strong enough in condemnation of the disgusting treatment of innocent people and the civilized world is faced with the appalling sight of 500,000 people about to rot away in starvation." He pointed out that this is not just a national problem but also a world problem. On 13 November 1938, Ogilvie-Forbes reported after Kristallnacht many German Jews "are wandering about in the streets and parks afraid to return to their homes". Ogilvie-Forbes also reported with disgust that none of the perpetrators of the Kristallnacht were going to be punished and that the Reich government had imposed a 1 billion Reichsmark fine on the entire Jewish community in Germany to punish the Jews for the violence inflicted on them. Since most of the Jewish homes and businesses had been destroyed in the Kristallnacht, Ogilvie-Forbes predicted the 1 billion Reichsmark fine was going to drive the German Jewish community into utter destitution.

Ogilvie-Forbes was in contact with members of the German opposition, who provided intelligence such as a copy of Hitler's secret speech to a group of 200 German journalists on 10 November 1938 saying he wanted more bellicose media coverage to prepare Germany for war. Ogilvie-Forbes also noted that in the secret speech Hitler called for Britain to be presented as "public enemy number one" and he kept hearing rumours that Hitler was planning to renounce the Anglo-German Naval Agreement. In this regard, Ogilvie-Forbes noted the German media was entirely Anglophobic with France being spared any abuse, which led him to the conclusion that Hitler was trying to sever France from Britain, so it could take on the latter alone without confronting the former. When Hitler gave the departing French ambassador André François-Poncet a medal at their last meeting in October 1938 for his work in improving Franco-German relations, Ogilvie-Forbes saw sinister implications in this. Amongst Ogilvie-Forbes's sources were Carl Friedrich Goerdeler, Ewald von Kleist-Schmenzin, Fabian von Schlabrendorff, and the mysterious man with the surname Ritter whom Ogilive-Forbes called K (as in knight, the equivalent English word for Ritter). Just whom K. was remains a mystery as the files from the British Embassy state his surname was Ritter (a common surname in Germany) and nothing else. K. reported that he had seen a plan to have the Luftwaffe prepare a bombing campaign to set London ablaze. At the same time, Ogilive-Forbes noted the increasing anti-British tone of the German media, evidence that Hitler had given orders to increase the size of the Luftwaffe and Kriegsmarine (which suggested German foreign policy was indeed turning anti-British), and information that Germany was moving over to a "total war" economy. Ogilivie-Forbes portrayed Hitler as a leader who was barely sane, if at all, and suggested he was eminently capable of a "mad dog act", a sudden, reckless act of aggression that would plunge the world into a world war. Halifax was known as the "Holy Fox" due to his cunning and his devotion to the Church of England, and Ogilvie-Forbes's picture of a brutal Nazi regime running roughshod over innocent German Jews disturbed Halifax's Anglican conscience.

At a meeting of the Foreign Policy Committee on 14 November 1938, Halifax cited Ogilvie-Forbes's dispatches as a reason for a tougher line with Germany. At a meeting of the cabinet, only the War Secretary Leslie Hore-Belisha supported Halifax's proposals for an "economic offensive" to keep the Balkans out of the German economic sphere of influence with Chamberlain; the Chancellor of the Exchequer, Sir John Simon; and the President of the Board of Trade, Sir Oliver Stanley, all condemning Halifax's plans as "economically unsound". The information from K. about the purported plan to raze London had more impact on British policy with Sir Alexander Cadogan writing in his diary about Chamberlain's reaction: "Glad he takes it seriously." At a meeting of the Committee of Imperial Defence called to discuss the information from K., Halifax's proposed staff talks with the French and propaganda around the world to counter the anti-British propaganda campaign coming from Germany as Goebbels was attacking Britain not just in Germany, but all around the world. Though Chamberlain dismissed the possibility of a surprise German bombing attack on London as unlikely, the Home Secretary, Sir Samuel Hoare, generally regarded as an ally of Chamberlain, came out in support of Halifax. Whilst Halifax did not prevail in this debate, the fact that he won over several cabinet ministers to his side suggests the direction the cabinet was moving in.

In a dispatch to London on 6 December 1938, Ogilvie-Forbes quoted from Mein Kampf to argue that for Hitler Germany could not obtain "world power status" without first winning Lebensraum ("living space") in Russia. Ogilvie-Forbes argued that with the Reich rearmed and in possession of Austria and the Sudetenland, what he was hearing from sources in Berlin was "that Herr Hitler is about to embark on the third stage of his programme, namely expansion beyond the boundaries of the territories inhabited by Germans. How exactly this is be achieved is the object of much speculation. One thing is certain: Nazi aims are on a grandiose scale, and there is no limit to their ultimate ambitions". Some sources were telling Ogilvie-Forbes that Hitler was planning to attack the Soviet Union in 1939 to establish "an independent Russian Ukraine under German tutelage", and afterwards Germany would expand into the Balkans and seek an "outlet on the Mediterranean via Italy". Other sources were telling Ogilvie-Forbes that Hitler was thinking about turning west in 1939 to "liquidate" France and Britain before Germany fell behind in the arms race. Ogilvie-Forbes quoted one German official as saying to him that Hitler was still undecided whether to turn west or east in 1939, but "it is the profound conviction of almost every thinking German that the tiger [Hitler] will jump soon".

Ogilvie-Forbes further reported that Hitler regarded the Munich Agreement as a diplomatic defeat as what he wanted was a war to "smash" Czechoslovakia, not an agreement to hand over the Sudetenland. He wrote that his sources were telling him that Hitler had wished he had taken a "stronger line" at the Munich conference, was now "abusing his moderate counselors for their pusillanimity" and had "dubbed all his generals cowards" for advising him not to attack Czechoslovakia in September 1938. Sir William Strang of the Foreign Office's Central Department wrote after reading the dispatch of 6 December: "This dispatch is a plain warning which ought not to be ignored. Unless we can rapidly and effectively increase our immediate powers of resistance, the expectation of the life of the British Empire may be shorter than we are perhaps ready to suppose". In another dispatch, Ogilvie-Forbes reported that the Nazi regime was upset that British spending on defence had not decreased after the Munich Agreement as expected, and that Hitler was planning to increase his defence spending in order to win the arms race and allow Germany to dominate Europe. On 2 January 1939, Ogilvie-Forbes endorsed a report from the military attache Colonel Noel Mason-MacFarlane. He supported Mason-MacFarlane's conclusion that another war was imminent even if he could not predict for certain what Hitler would do in 1939: "What is certain is that the military and civilian resources of the country are prepared for an emergency." Mason-MacFarlane wrote he believed that given the current political and economic problems faced by the Reich, Hitler would almost certainly resort to "some foreign excursion" as the way out and that the German economy and military were on "full throttle" for war. Ogilvie-Forbes also endorsed Mason-MacFarlane's conclusion that Halifax should work to strengthen Anglo-French ties and to encourage the French to improve their ties with their allies in Eastern Europe, saying that a combination of Britain and France was the only thing that could deter Hitler from choosing war. Finally, Ogilvie-Forbes approved of Mason-MacFarlane's warning that Hitler would probably strike one of the states of Eastern Europe, such as Czecho-Slovakia, Poland or the Soviet Union in order to exploit their natural resources and people before turning west to strike at France and Great Britain.

On 3 January 1939, Ogilvie-Forbes engaged in what Ascher called an act of personal appeasement towards Henderson, when he wrote in a dispatch that the Wehrmacht was so overwhelmingly powerful that there was now nothing Britain could do to stop Germany from dominating Eastern Europe, and that British diplomats should make more efforts "to cultivate Field Marshal Göring and the moderate Nazis with a view to their exercising a restraining influence on the extremists such as Ribbentrop, Goebbels, and Himmler who at present have the ear of Hitler". In the same dispatch, he wrote that Göring "is so devotedly loyal to his chief that I see no indication whatever of his leading a movement against the Führer". Ascher wrote that this dispatch is so completely at odds with the rest of the dispatches Ogilvie-Forbes sent between October 1938-February 1939 that it is hard to guess what Ogilvie-Forbes was thinking when he wrote it. Ascher argued that the most likely explanation was that the dispatch of 3 January was meant to appease Henderson when he returned to the embassy in Berlin, as Ogilvie-Forbes knew that Henderson would disapprove of what he was writing, as indeed he did.

In a dispatch in January 1939, Ogilvie-Forbes warned that Hitler was planning to turn the Franco-German friendship pact of 6 December 1938 into a non-aggression pact, which would leave Britain alone as the Reich's main enemy in western Europe. Afterwards, he predicted that if what he was hearing about Hitler's plans for expanding Luftwaffe and Kriegsmarine was true, that Germany would launch an air-naval offensive against Britain with the Luftwaffe to bomb British cities into the ground while the Kriegsmarine would sink the British Merchant Marine, causing a famine since Britain's population exceeded its agricultural capacity. In this regard, Ogilvie-Forbes stated that he kept hearing rumours that Hitler was planning to seize the Netherlands to provide air bases closer to Britain. Ogilvie-Forbes ended by suggesting there was no resistance movement in Germany that was powerful enough to overthrow the Nazi regime, but Hitler could be overthrown externally.

In the Berlin Embassy's annual report for 1938 Ogilvie-Forbes noted that at the beginning of the year it was estimated there were 15,700 prisoners at Dachau of whom over 12,000 were Jews being subjected to harsh treatment. In the concentration camp at Buchenwald there were 30,000 Jews who were in many cases treated with brutality. He warned that unless Hitler was stopped by war, "extermination [of the Jews] in Germany can only be a matter of time." Ogilvie-Forbes argued on several occasions that the British Government might persuade Hitler to use the one billion Reichsmark fine, levied against the entire community of German Jews after Kristallnacht to punish them for having allegedly provoked the pogrom against themselves, to fund Jewish emigration, an action that he believed could really save Jewish lives. The government ignored this suggestion. He was also keen to point out that Nazi anti-Semitism was symptomatic of Hitler's frame of mind; that it was Hitler who was personally conducting the campaign against the Jews. The American historian Abraham Ascher, himself a German Jew who fled the Third Reich, wrote that there was a real sense of personal empathy with the sufferings of German Jews in Ogilvie-Forbes's dispatches that Henderson never displayed. Unlike Henderson, Ogilvie-Forbes attached far greater significance to Nazi antisemitism.

After Hitler gave his "Prophecy Speech" to the Reichstag on 30 January 1939, Ogilvie-Forbes wrote the "extermination" of the Jews in Germany "can only be a matter of time". Ogilvie-Forbes wrote that antisemitism in Germany was "not a national, but a world problem, which if neglected, contains the seeds of a terrible vengeance". As regards helping individual Jews to escape from the Nazis, in his position as a senior diplomat Ogilvie-Forbes could not be seen to be "bending the rules". However, he was able to help an acquaintance, Klaus Neuberg and secure the release of his son and three nephews from Sachsenhausen, and the subsequent move of eight of the family to New Zealand. This was organised through Captain Frank Foley, the passport control officer in the embassy, whom Ogilvie-Forbes supported, unofficially, in his work to enable thousands of Jews to escape. A New Zealand man, John Schellenberg in a letter of 14 March 2004 to the British historian Sir Martin Gilbert stated that Ogilive-Forbes assisted the efforts of his parents to leave Germany. Schellenberg's father, Rudolf Schellenberg, was the Jewish service manager of a local Ford dealership in Berlin, and Ogilvie-Forbes was a customer. Schellenberg fils told Gilbert:

"One day in 1938, Forbes came to my father and advised him that it would be well to take his family out of Germany as soon as possible. Further, Forbes undertook to provide papers for any country in the British Empire that my parents choose. So it came about that they chose New Zealand, papers were duly provided and the three of us arrived safely in Wellington on 28 March 1939. My father's parents, two of his uncles and an aunt, and their spouses, my mother's widowed mother, and one of her sisters-all were lost. There is no doubt in my mind that Forbes must have arranged the New Zealand documentation through Foley and I have in my possession the original of a letter approving our entry into this country, written by the responsible Government authority. It is addressed to the Passport Control Officer, British Embassy, Berlin."

Ogilvie-Forbes's dispatches had an impact on British foreign policy decision-making in the winter of 1938–39 as Halifax who during this period was consistently the member of the Chamberlain cabinet toughest on Germany, used the dispatches from Berlin to argue in cabinet that Britain needed a harder line with the Reich. In part because of the dispatches written by Ogilvie-Forbes, Britain announced a "guarantee" of France, the Low Countries and Switzerland in February 1939, warning that any German aggression against those states would automatically lead to war with the United Kingdom.

When Henderson returned to Berlin on 13 February 1939, his first act was to assemble the senior embassy staff to castigate Ogilvie-Forbes for what he had written in his dispatches during his absence. Henderson announced that henceforward all dispatches from the embassy in Berlin would have to conform to his views and that any diplomat who disobeyed this directive would be fired from the Foreign Office. In a lengthy dispatch Henderson sent on 6 March 1939, he denounced almost everything that Ogilvie-Forbes had written during his absence. From that time until August, Ogilvie-Forbes was largely excluded from the decision-making process. In August 1939, American journalist Louis P. Lochner showed the American diplomat Alexander Comstock Kirk the text of the Obersalzberg speech, calling for the coming war in Poland to be conducted in the most inhumane way possible and he gave Genghis Khan as a role model, asking him to transmit back to Washington, but Kirk was not interested. On 22 August 1939, Lochner contacted Ogilvie-Forbes and gave him the text of the Obersalzberg speech, which he reported back to London the same day.

Margaret Reid, who worked in the passport control office of the Berlin Embassy, issued visas that allowed thousands of Jews to emigrate. She often bent the rules for issuing visas, a practice that was deliberately overlooked by Ogilvie-Forbes. Both Reid and Ogilvie-Forbes were recipients of the British Hero of the Holocaust award in January 2018 for saving Jewish lives. Frank Foley was one of the first recipients in 2010.

== The Danzig crisis ==
Shortly after 1:30 am on the night of 27–28 August 1939, Ogilvie-Forbes was woken up by the Swedish businessman Birger Dahlerus who was acting as a self-appointed peace-maker with a message that he had a peace plan from Hermann Göring to prevent the Danzig crisis from turning into a war. On the morning of 28 August 1939, when Henderson returned from the Reich Chancellery where he met Hitler to discuss the Dahlerus peace plan, a meeting that did not go well, Ogilvie-Forbes warned Dahlerus that his plan to stop a war was unravelling. On 30 August, Ogilvie-Forbes phoned Baron Bernardo Attolico, the Italian ambassador to Germany, and unaware that the Forschungsamt ("research office") was listening in, stated everyone in the British Embassy was waiting for London to reply to Dahlerus's peace plan, saying that the longer they waited, the better, as he hoped to drag out talks to resolve the Danzig crisis into the fall, which would weaken the chances of Germany invading Poland. The expected autumn rains would turn the unpaved Polish country roads into mud, making it very difficult for the Wehrmacht to move about. On 31 August, Ogilvie-Forbes phoned Dahlerus to tell him that he heard that Ribbentrop had told Hitler that Britain would do nothing if the Reich invaded Poland, an assessment that he felt made war more likely than not.

Later that same day, 31 August 1939, on Henderson's orders, Ogilvie-Forbes took Dahlerus to meet Jozef Lipski, the Polish ambassador to Germany, to show him his peace plan. The meeting held in German (the only common language of the three men) went poorly with Lipski objecting to the Germanophile Dahlerus's ranting against Poland as Dahlerus accused the Poles of being the instigators of the Danzig crisis by refusing to allow the Free City of Danzig to rejoin Germany and in addition to demanding that the Polish Corridor return to Germany as well. Finally "to stop this ghastly business" as he called it, Lipski claimed he could not understand Dahlerus's German and sent him off to dictate his peace plan to his secretary. After Dahlerus left the room, Lipski turned to Ogilvie-Forbes, and expressed great anger at British policy, saying that as a Pole, he did not want to be harangued by some Swedish amateur diplomat whom he had never heard of before; he definitely would not agree to hand over parts of Poland at the urging of this amateur diplomat; and finally he stated he found it astonishing that the British were really taking Dahlerus seriously. Lipski expressed his belief that the best way of stopping the Danzig crisis from turning into a war was a "united front" of Britain, France and Poland to deter Germany, and the British should not be talking to somebody like Dahlerus, who clearly was an amateur diplomat operating way beyond his level of competence. Ogilvie-Forbes agreed with Lipski that Henderson should not had been talking to Dahlerus, but Ogilvie-Forbes was as the historian Donald Cameron Watt called him a "dyed-in-the-wool professional diplomat", indeed so professional that he did not criticise his chief in front of a foreign diplomat.

On the morning of 1 September 1939, Germany invaded Poland, and Henderson sent Ogilvie-Forbes to hear Hitler give his speech before the Reichstag claiming that it was Poland that just attacked Germany. On the morning of 3 September 1939, at about 7:43 am, Ogilvie-Forbes made a phone call to Dahlerus that once again was listened into by the Forschungsamt saying that: "Henderson would be going over at 9 am and would request a reply by 11 am; if that was not forthcoming, they would ask for their passports and all would be over". Dahlerus, who was still convinced as late as the morning of 3 September 1939 that he could stop World War II, phoned Ogilvie-Forbes at about 10:30 am, asking the British to give more time to their ultimatum that Henderson had submitted to Hitler that morning, saying he had a plan to have Göring fly to London where he would prevent the German-Polish war that began two days before from becoming a world war. Ogilvie-Forbes, who knew that Britain would be at war with Germany in half an hour's time, as the ultimatum was set to expire at 11 am, in an attempt to politely brush off Dahlerus told him that Britain would consider his plan, but required proof that Germany was acting in complete sincerity. Ogilvie-Forbes then put Dahlerus on the phone to Halifax at 10:50 am. Halifax in turn told Dahlerus that if Germany wanted to prevent a world war, all the Reich had to do was agree to the British ultimatum to cease the war against Poland at once, and since Hitler had no intention of doing that, he was just wasting his time with his latest peace plan. At 11 am, the ultimatum expired, and Prime Minister Neville Chamberlain announced on the BBC that Britain was now at war with Germany.

== Minister in Havana ==
After leaving Berlin soon after the outbreak of war, Ogilvie-Forbes was sent as Counsellor to the British Embassy in Norway, but had to leave almost immediately in company with the ambassador and the royal family when the Germans invaded. From 1940 to 1944 he was Minister to Cuba and then from 1944 to 1949 Ambassador to Venezuela. Upon his arrival in Havana, the devout Catholic Ogilvie-Forbes found himself the object of a personal attack by the conservative Catholic newspaper Diario de la Marina which charged that his efforts to help refugees in the Spanish Civil War, both Republican and Nationalist, proved that he was not a good Catholic. The editor of Diario de la Marina, José Rivero, was an admirer of General Franco, and like other supporters of the Nationalist cause regarded any sort of assistance to the "Red Republicans", even refugees, as a sign of lack of a proper Catholicism. In late 1940, Ogilvie-Forbes reported to London that Cuba was "a country where a teeming population live in abject poverty side by side with a wealthy, ostentatious and thoughtlessly selfish minority who pay practically no direct taxation and who manipulate without scruple the Government to their own interests". He was not impressed with the Cuban politicians whom he wrote "...90 per cent of whom are completely ignorant of the duties entrusted to them and who have attained their positions by questionable means". He also noted that the Cuban economy revolved mainly upon selling sugar abroad, especially to the United States, and he expressed worries that a fall in the world sugar price would cause "an internal revolution ending in some form of Communism".

In December 1941, Cuba under strong American pressure declared war on the Axis powers, which led to the closing of the German and Italian legations whose diplomats Ogilvie-Forbes had competed against. In June 1942, Ogilvie-Forbes negotiated an agreement that led the Royal Air Force (RAF) use the air base at San Antonio de los Baņos to conduct anti-submarine patrols over the Caribbean Sea. Later in 1942, he negotiated another agreement to let the RAF use the San Julián Air Base for anti-submarine patrols. The United States, Venezuela, and Mexico were all major sources of oil for the Allies and in an attempt to cut the Allies off, U-boats waged a major campaign in the Caribbean Sea and Gulf of Mexico in 1942, sinking the oil tankers, which made the naval campaign in the Caribbean a major concern in London.

Much of his time was taken up with defending the interests of British and Canadian insurance companies in Cuba (Canada had no diplomatic representation in Havana with the British legation representing Canada until 1945). Cuba sought to tax the insurance companies' profits abroad, which the British charged violated the 1937 Anglo-Cuban Treaty of Commerce, a dispute made complex by the Cuban claim that the treaty did not cover the Canadian companies. At least 40% of the "British" people living in Cuba during the war were actually Canadians, and as such Ogilvie-Forbes frequently had to cable Ottawa as well as London. Reflecting Cuba's semi-colonial relationship with the United States, a contingent of Federal Bureau of Investigation (FBI) agents were assigned to the American embassy in Havana, whom Ogilvie-Forbes noted operated as if Cuba were part of the United States, as he described the FBI in Cuba as "a kind of Gestapo under the clock of the Cuban police". He reported that officials from the American embassy had told him that Cuba was America's "stepchild" and that Britain should "KEEP OUT from nosing into Cuban affairs". The impression Ogilvie-Forbe had was the Americans regarded Cuba as being in their own sphere of influence and resented any British "meddling" in Cuba.

Owing to British "total war", traditional British exports to Cuba such as cloth, coal, whisky, and pharmaceuticals had almost ceased during the war. By 1943, Ogilvie-Forbes reported to London "our trade with Cuba has lost very heavily to the Americans, not only in commodities, but also in goodwill and the possibility of recovery". The Cuban president Fulgencio Batista wanted to upgrade relations with Britain from the legation level to the embassy level, but owing to the discrimination in Cuba against people from the British West Indian islands, who were overwhelmingly black, London refused. In a dispatch from London, Ogilvie-Forbes was told that it was not possible to upgrade relations until the "scandalous" mistreatment of British West Indians in Cuba ended first. The issue took up much of his time as he wrote in 1943 that it was "rather pusillanimous" to assume "that British West Indians will renounce their British citizenship and it also ignores the growing movement to deny certain rights either to nautralised Cubans or to Cubans of foreign parentage". In another dispatch, he warned that pro-democratic "sentiment is not carried to the extent of doing justice to British West Indians, still less, of giving a fair chance to earn a living". In the summer of 1943, Ogilvie-Forbes wrote after visiting Guantanamo that it was "indescribable" the living conditions of British West Indians who were working at the American naval base there and that "there were further cases of arrests of British West Indians" by the Cuban police. J. Petinaud, the president of the British West Indian Democratic Association, which represented the immigrants, gave Ogilvie-Forbes a dossier detailing the beatings of West Indian immigrants by the Cuban police together with the murder of least one. Ogilvie-Forbes in a dispatch to the Foreign Secretary, Anthony Eden, urged that "strong language" be used in diplomatic notes to the Cuban government, but also noted "the means of reprisal were practically Nil" while "previous experience" has proved that the United States would not be involved on Britain's side.

In his last dispatch from Havana before leaving in May 1944, Ogilvie-Forbes wrote that Cuba's contribution to the Allied war effort was only superficial and he predicated that British interests in Cuba would continue to suffer owing to American economic domination. The war caused a massive increase in the price of sugar, and Ogilvie-Forbes predicated that the war-time prosperity had put off "the day of reckoning" for Cuba at least for some time. However, he noted: "There is no doubt that these benefits [of the war] were not properly distributed, and that the Cuban people will one day have cause to regret the growing disparity of wealth amongst the various classes of the community".

== Ambassador in Caracas ==
In 1944, Ogilvie-Forbes was appointed as the British minister in Venezuela, which was regarded as a promotion. Venezuela was the world's third largest oil producer, and was as a consequence always a major concern for British diplomacy. When Britain upgraded relations with Venezuela from the legation to the embassy level, Ogilvie-Forbes became the first British ambassador in Caracas. At the San Francisco conference, which founded the United Nations, the Venezuelan Foreign Minister, Caracciolo Parra Pérez, announced that the Venezuela did not recognize the border with British Guiana (modern Guyana), leading Ogilvie-Forbes to predict to Eden a return to the long running border dispute, which had been supposedly settled for good in 1899. In the same dispatch, he drew Eden's attention to the article in the newspaper El Pais by Rómulo Betancourt of the Acción Democrática (AD) who argued that Venezuela should lay claim to the Netherlands Antilles and the British colony of Trinidad, both of which were off the coast of Venezuela. Ogilvie-Forbes described Betancourt as a firebrand nationalist who greatly resented the power of the oil companies in his country who had once belonged to the Venezuelan Communist Party, but who was now friendly with the British press attache in Caracas.

During his time as ambassador, he witnessed the coup of 18 October 1945 and the tumultuous three years of El Trienio Adeco when Venezuela became a democracy for the first time under President Rómulo Betancourt. He was very much a supporter of the AD government, writing in December 1945 about the Venezuelan delegation to the newly founded United Nations that "they are as good as be expected from this well meaning revolutionary government". Despite the vast wealth generated by the oil industry, most Venezuelans were illiterate as the government had never established an educational system. El Trienio Adeco saw the first attempt to ensure that the pardo (mixed race) majority of the Venezuelans received some benefits from the oil industry like establishing a mass educational system, measures that Ogilvie-Forbes approved of. In his Political Report for 1945, he presented a very hostile picture of the former presidents Eleazar López Contreras and Isaías Medina Angarita. About the latter, he wrote "his capacity for leadership befuddled by riotous living was completely cowed". About the AD government, he wrote: "the new government are on the whole young and inexperienced, but sincere in their efforts for reform. They have undertaken the formidable task of cleaning up in a few months the corruption of centuries, and while they will probably not have entire success, they are present honest and are deserving of sympathy in their attempt to improve the living condition of the Venezuelan people." In 1946, President Betancourt visited Guatemala, where he praised his fellow "revolutionary", President Juan José Arévalo. During his visit, Betancourt supported the Guatemalan claim to the British colony of British Honduras (modern Belize) while also laying claim to British Guiana, arguing that in his view the Atlantic Charter made European control of any territory in the New World illegal. Ogilvie-Forbes tried to defend Betancourt by arguing that his speech had been promoted by Arévalo and did not reflect his true feelings towards Britain. The supportive attitude taken by the ambassador towards Betancourt was not shared by his superiors in London.

Ogilvie-Forbes's favorable view of the trienio government put him at odds with the American ambassador, Frank P. Corrigan, who was openly hostile to the social democratic AD government. Victor Perowne of the American Department of the Foreign Office wrote: "Ogilvie-Forbes has reported consistently favorably on the Revolutionary Government and harshly on its predecessors. There is some room for doubt whether these views do not require some qualification, at any rate they are not those of the U.S. ambassador, a man with a far wider and deeper experience of Venezuela than Ogilvie-Forbes". In response, Ogilvie-Forbes reported the deposed Medina Angarita government had been "notoriously supine in its attitude towards the interests of German firms established in Venezuela". Perowne wrote on the margin of Ogilvie-Forbes's dispatch: "Our and (Corrigan's) experience in Venezuela is longer than that of Oglivie-Forbes who has shown himself a envouté of the charms of the present government-one of least, of whose members made a most unfavorable impression in London, barely a year ago". In June 1946, one of the oil companies operating in Venezuela, the Royal Dutch Shell company, requested that Ogilvie-Forbes have a warship sent to Venezuelan waters for "its calming effect on the European staff", a request that was refused.

== Retirement and death ==
On retirement Ogilvie-Forbes farmed his estate of Boyndlie, Aberdeenshire, was appointed a Deputy Lieutenant for Aberdeenshire, and became actively involved in various local charities and cultural organisations. He was a member of the Scottish Council for Development and Industry and the Catholic Council of Great Britain. For a short time he supported the Scottish National Party and was then designated by the 4th Scottish National Assembly to negotiate with the UK Government on the principle of self-government for Scotland under the Scottish Covenant Association Scheme of 1950. He died of a heart attack in 1954 at the age of 63.

== Family ==
Ogilvie-Forbes married Clare Louise Hunter in 1921 and had two children, Lt Colonel Thomas Drostan Ogilvie-Forbes, Royal Engineers, who died in 1946 at the age of 24, and Christine Mary Margaret Ogilvie-Forbes (Mrs. Brose) who worked in Hut 8, Bletchley Park (1939–1945). One of his half-brothers, Air Vice Marshall Neill Ogilvie-Forbes OBE was Assistant Chief of Air Staff (Intelligence) 1950–52 and a half-sister Marion Wilberforce was one of the first eight women pilots to join the ATA in January 1940.

== Honours ==
Ogilvie-Forbes was appointed a Companion of the Order of Saint Michael and Saint George (CMG) in the 1934 New Year Honours, and promoted to Knight Commander of the Order (KCMG) in the 1937 Coronation Honours.

Diplomatic posts
Preceded by Henry Chilton	British Chargé d'affaires to the Holy See; 1930–1932	Succeeded by Ivone Kirkpatrick
Preceded by Herbert Grant Watson	British Minister to Cuba; 1940–1944	Succeeded by James Leishman Dodds
Preceded by Donald Gainer	British Ambassador to Cuba; 1944–1948	Succeeded by John Hall Magowan
