= Arthur Dowden =

British Army officer and diplomat (1894–1979)

Arthur Ernest Dowden (13 December 1894 – 2 February 1979) was a British Army officer and diplomat. He was posthumously recognised as a British Hero of the Holocaust in 2013.

== Early life ==
Dowden was educated at Edinburgh Academy, then was a student of medicine at the University of Edinburgh (1913–15) where he was in the Officers' Training Corps. He was commissioned as an officer in the Gordon Highlanders in August 1917. He was Divisional Intelligence Officer, February to October 1918, and Liaison Officer in Trieste, 1919.

On 13 December 1922, Dowden was appointed vice-consul at Bratislava, Czecho-Slovakia. After this consulate was closed on 20 October 1928, he worked for Lloyd's.

== Service in Nazi Germany ==
On 11 December 1934, Dowden was appointed British Vice Consul in Frankfurt am Main. He remained in this post, in which he reported to Consul General Robert Smallbones, until Britain declared war on Germany in September 1939.

After Kristallnacht, the anti-Jewish pogroms in Germany in November 1938, Dowden, together with his superior, undertook assistance activities for the benefit of the Jewish population that was being persecuted by the Nazi state. In the first few days after the riots on 9 November 1938, Dowden travelled through the city in the consulate's car and brought food to the apartments of Frankfurt Jews who were not allowed to leave their home due to a curfew imposed against Jews after the pogroms and were therefore unable to provide themselves with food. He gave numerous Jews safe refuge from attacks by SA units and other Nazi supporters in the consulate building, which was considered an extraterritorial area as the diplomatic representation of another state, so that they were here were initially exempt from persecution from the ranks of state or party organizations of the Nazis.

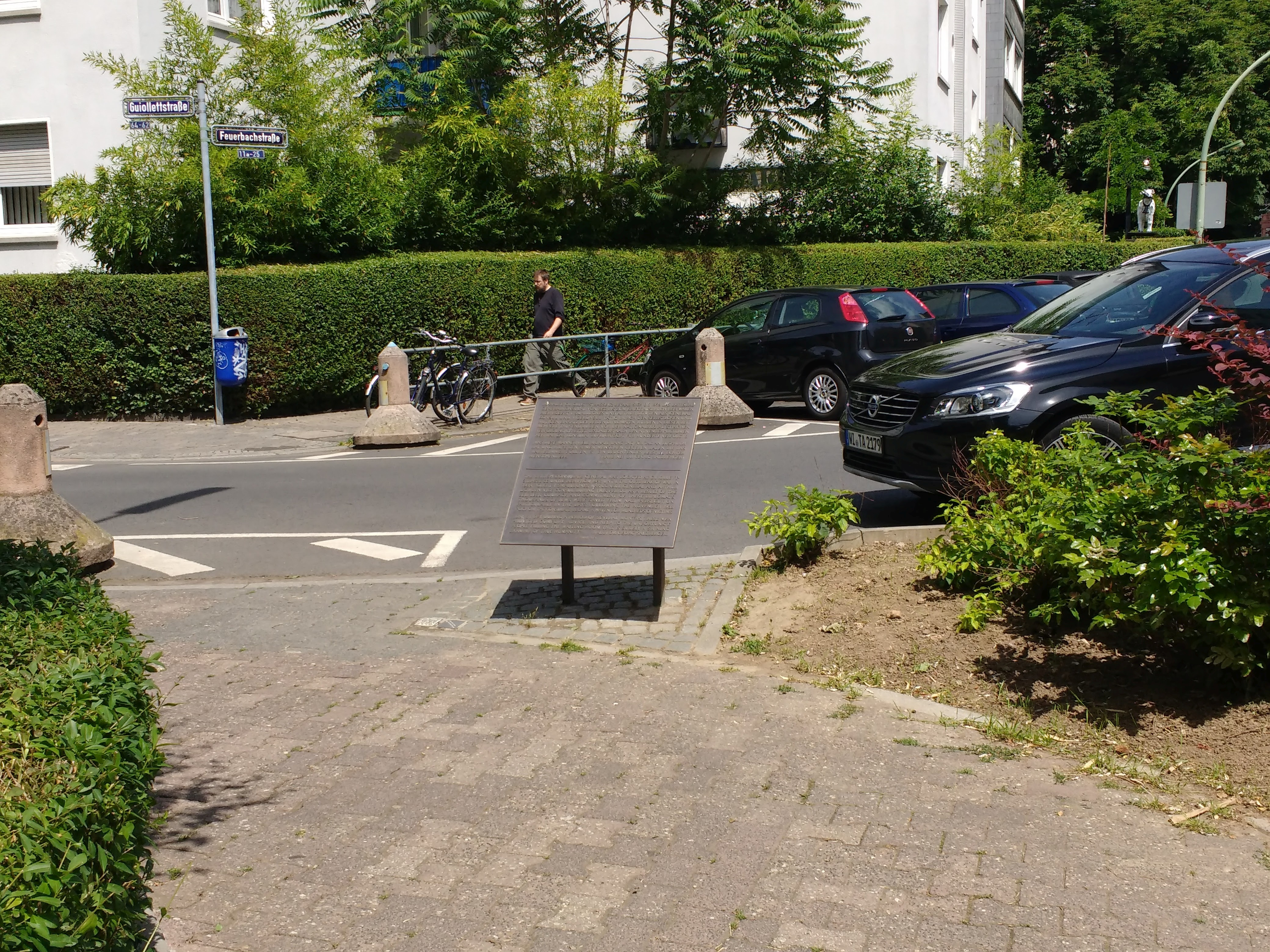
The plaque in Frankfurt commemorates the help that the two British diplomats Smallbones and Dowden provided to Jewish people from their consulate to enable them to escape Nazi Germany after 9 November 1938.

Above all, in the months after Kristallnacht, Dowden, together with his superior Smallbones, enabled several thousand German Jews to leave Germany for Great Britain or the overseas territories of the British Empire by granting them entry visas in an unbureaucratic and generous manner. In doing so, they went far beyond the regulations for issuing visas for the benefit of the persecuted and also issued visas to people who were legally not allowed to be granted entry into British territory. The two are often credited with having removed thousands of people from the Nazi sphere of influence, where they would otherwise most likely have been trapped as part of the measures imposed by the Nazi leadership during the Second World War.

From 16 November 1939 to June 1940 Dowden was posted to the British Embassy in Rome. In 1940, Dowden was placed on 'the Black Book' (Sonderfahndungsliste G.B. "Special Search List Great Britain"), a list of 2,820 persons who were to be arrested by the SS in the event of a German occupation of Britain. In the Second World War, he again served, as an officer in the Intelligence Corps.

In 2013 Dowden and Smallbones were each posthumously awarded the medal of a British Hero of the Holocaust. Dowden's award was received by his grandsons.

== Commemoration ==
A plaque at the Foreign and Commonwealth Office in London was unveiled on 20 November 2008, naming him and seven other British diplomats who had worked to assist Jewish refugees.

In 2013 John Bercow, the Speaker of the House of Commons, unveiled a plaque to Dowden and his consul-general Robert Smallbones on the green fronting Golders Green Jewish Cemetery; A similar plaque was unveiled in the presence of the then British Ambassador to Germany, Simon McDonald, and the Mayor of Frankfurt, Peter Feldmann at the site of the former British consulate general in Frankfurt.
