= Margaret Reid (intelligence officer) =

Margaret Grant Reid MBE (2 August 1912, Nottingham – 20 April 1974, Nottingham) was a British intelligence officer and consular official in Berlin and in Norway. She received the MBE for her work during the 1940 German invasion of Norway. She was a posthumous recipient of the British Hero of the Holocaust award as, in 1938 and 1939, she had saved Jewish lives by issuing documents that permitted people to travel from Nazi Germany.

== Early life ==
Born in Nottingham on 2 August 1912, Margaret Grant Reid was a daughter of surgeon Alexander Christie Reid and Ellen Jane Shaw née Grant, a daughter of John Charles Grant, minister of St Andrew's Presbyterian Church, Nottingham. She was educated at Nottingham Girls' High School and studied modern languages at Girton College, Cambridge, graduating in 1934.

== Berlin, 1938–39 ==
Reid joined the Civil Service and, in 1938, was posted to the British Embassy in Berlin to work in the passport control office under Frank Foley. Reid arrived in Berlin shortly after Kristallnacht in November 1938 and the passport office was overwhelmed with applications for visas from Jewish families seeking to leave Germany. The embassy's passport control office issued visas that allowed thousands of Jews to emigrate. Reid often bent the rules for issuing visas; this was deliberately overlooked by the British Consul-General George Ogilvie-Forbes.

== Norway, 1939–40 ==
After the United Kingdom declaration of war on Germany in September 1939, Reid and Frank Foley were transferred to the Legation in Oslo. After Germany invaded Norway in April 1940, Foley, first secretary, and Reid, his private secretary and cipher clerk, withdrew from Oslo on 9 April 1940 and travelled north to Lillehammer, then to Åndalsnes. Before leaving Oslo, Foley and Reid burned the documents in the UK legation. Foley had a radio transmitter that allowed Norway's commander-in-chief, General Otto Ruge to maintain communication with London, independent of Norwegian landlines. Reid was a cipher expert who coded the messages sent to Britain. As the codebooks had been destroyed, she laboriously used the MI6 emergency code, a book cipher based on an 1865 edition of John Ruskin's Sesame and Lilies. Foley and Reid were evacuated by the Royal Navy from Molde on HMT Ulster Prince on 1 May.

Reid was appointed a Member of the Most Excellent Order of the British Empire (MBE) for "her gallantry and devotion to duty during the evacuation from Norway" in the 1941 Birthday Honours, and she received the Norwegian Krigsmedaljen (War Medal) in 1942.

== Later life and legacy ==
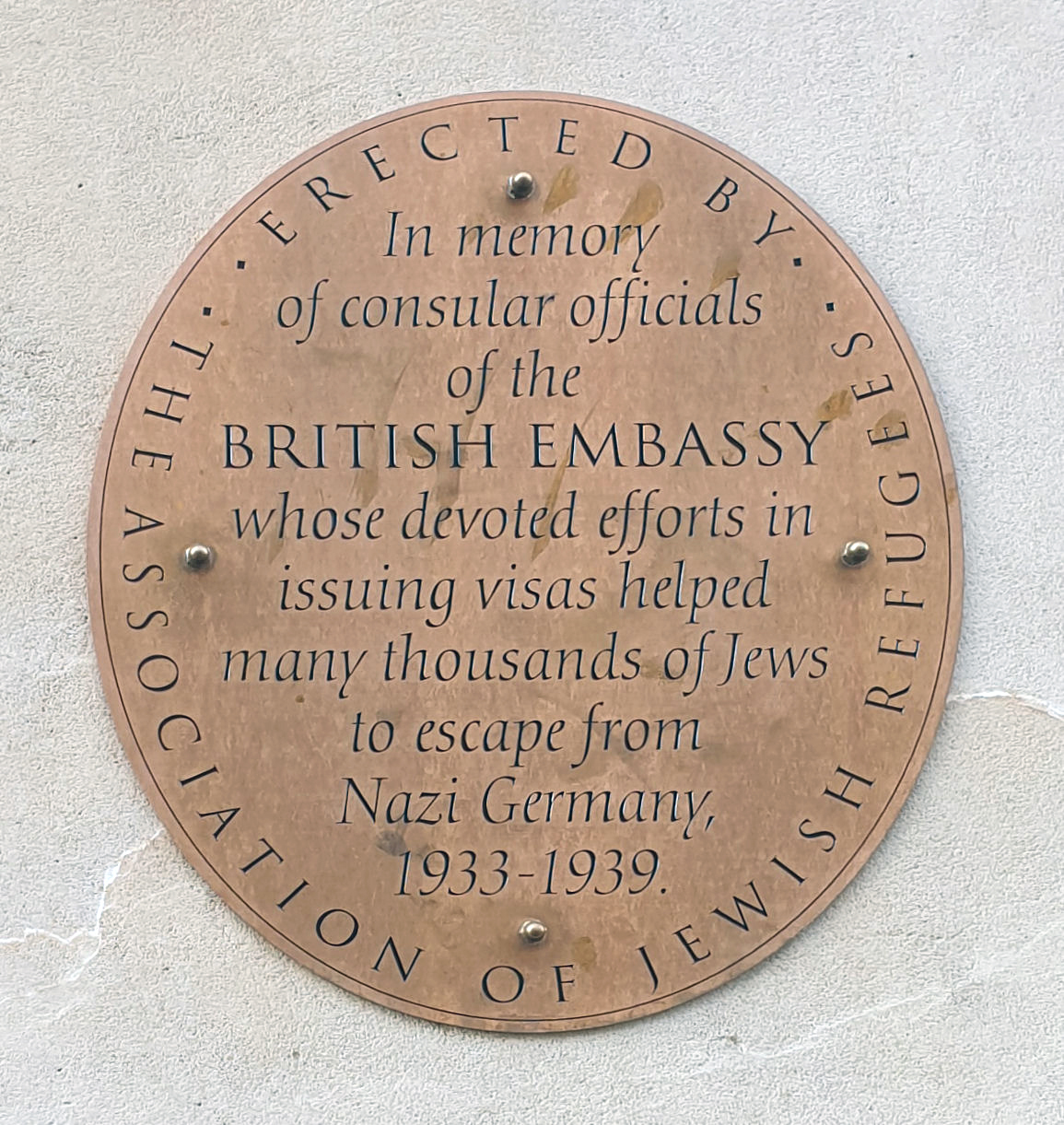
Plaque at the Embassy of the United Kingdom, Berlin, unveiled in 2020 by the Association of Jewish Refugees

In 1942 she married Lt Col. Edward Cuthbert de Renzy Martin, a MI6 section head; both died in 1974.

Her journal from the Norwegian campaign is held by the Imperial War Museum and was published in Norway in 1980. Other papers are in the University of Leeds.

In January 2018 both Reid and George Ogilvie-Forbes were recipients of the British Hero of the Holocaust award for saving Jewish lives. Frank Foley was one of the first recipients in 2010. The Association of Jewish Refugees unveiled a plaque to honour the consular officials at the British Embassy in Berlin on 12 May 2020.
