= Maria Kotarba =

Polish resistance fighter (1907–1956)

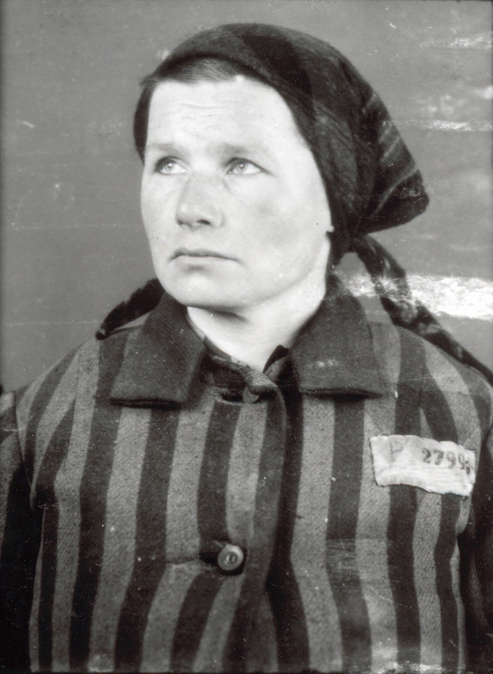
- Kotarba, 1943, Auschwitz concentration camp photo
- Born: 4 September 1907 near Nowy Sącz, Galicia and Lodomeria, Austria-Hungary
- Died: 30 December 1956 (aged 49)
- Burial place: Owczary, Poland
- Known for: being a courier in the Polish resistance and saving Jews during World War II
- Awards: Righteous Among the Nations

Maria Kotarba (4 September 1907 — 30 December 1956) was a courier in the Polish resistance movement, smuggling clandestine messages and supplies among the local partisan groups. She was arrested, tortured and interrogated by the Gestapo as a political prisoner before being imprisoned in Tarnów and then deported to Auschwitz on 6 January 1943. Maria Kotarba was recognised as Righteous Among the Nations by Yad Vashem on 18 September 2005 for risking her life to save the lives of Jewish prisoners in two Nazi concentration camps.

== Auschwitz concentration camp ==
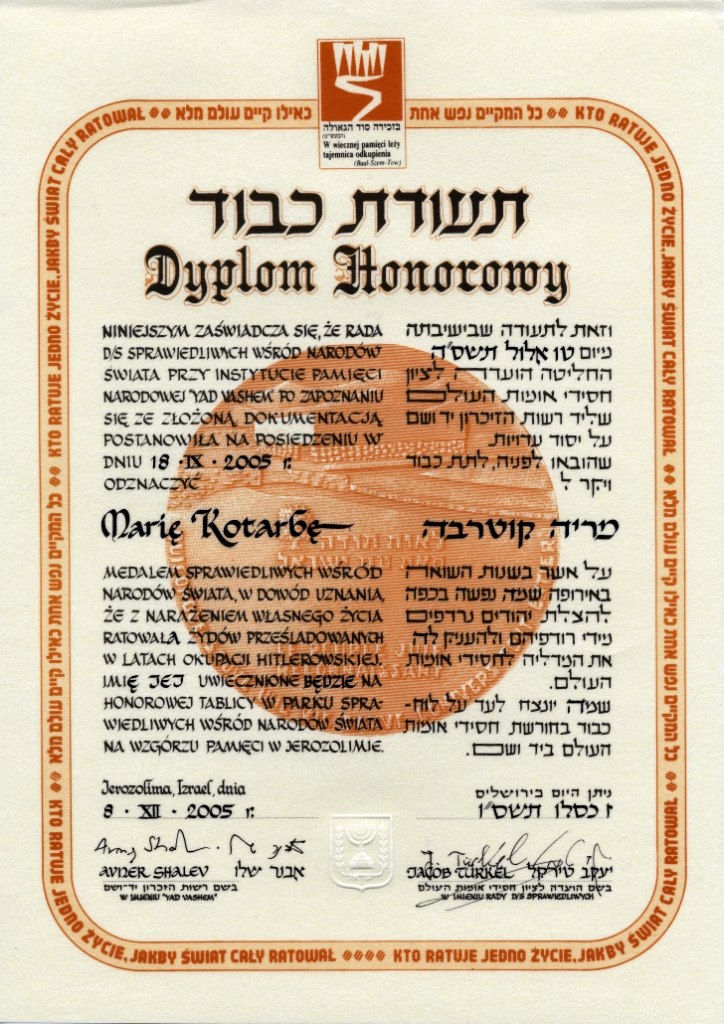
Kotarba's Righteous Among the Nations Diploma

Kotarba was born near Nowy Sącz in southern Poland (then in the Austrian Partition). After the Nazi German invasion of Poland in September 1939, Maria Kotarba, a Catholic, witnessed the extermination of her Jewish neighbours near Gorlice, where she lived, and vowed to aid any Jew she could. Arriving at Auschwitz in the winter of 1943 she was allocated the prisoner number 27995, and after a range of camp duties, in the middle of 1943 was assigned to Kommando Gartnerei, the Gardening Commando labour squad. She worked in the confiscated gardens around the nearby village of Rajsko, involved in the cultivation of vegetables and other ancillary labours. By the summer of 1943, the resistance movement in the camp became organised and brought Kotarba into their ranks. Her reputation as a skilled courier traveled with her from Tarnów. Maria was involved in smuggling food, medicine and messages from the outside resistance groups into the camp.

=== Friendships ===
In the camp, Kotarba met Lena Mankowska (née Bankier), deported to the camp from the Jewish Ghetto in Białystok. At registration, the prisoner-clerks registered Lena as a Polish political prisoner on account of her non-Jewish looks. The two women developed a deep and lasting friendship. Kotarba was aware of the other woman's perilous position and did all she could to help her as well as her sister, Guta, who arrived in Auschwitz from the concentration camp at Lublin-Majdanek with her friend Henia Trysk. Lena Mankowska referred to Kotarba as the "Mommy of Auschwitz" (Polish: Mateczka). As a courier, Kotarba delivered medicine for the prisoner-doctors and brought in other supplies, which they shared. She used her resistance contacts to have Lena Mankowska allocated to lighter duties when she fell sick, and cooked soup for her on a small stove in her block.

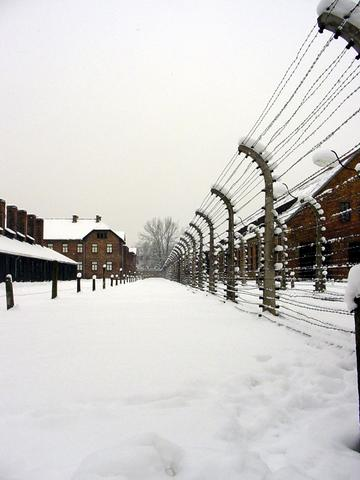
Auschwitz

In January 1945, the SS evacuated the camp through Birkenau deeper into Nazi Germany. The two women arrived separately at Ravensbrück in open coal wagons. Kotarba found her Jewish friend almost dead in the snow and carried her to her own barracks. In February 1945, the SS again moved the prisoners to the Neustadt-Glewe sub-camp, where the Red Army liberated the women in May 1945. After liberation, the two friends parted. Maria Kotarba returned to her home in Poland, remained single and died in 1956, aged 49, never having returned to the health she enjoyed before the war. She was buried in Owczary.

Lena Mankowska married Wladyslaw Łakomy and settled in Great Britain. In 1997, Lena Lakomy made an unsuccessful attempt to get Maria, her "Angel of Auschwitz", recognised as one of the Righteous Among the Nations by Yad Vashem in Jerusalem. Eight years later James Foucar successfully resubmitted her testimony, which was approved by Yad Vashem on 8 December 2005 based on Kotarba's qualifications for inclusion. Lena Lakomy was posthumously recognised as a British Hero of the Holocaust.

== Resources ==
- Yad Vashem Remembrance Authority, Jerusalem, Maria Kotarba, Righteous Among the Nations
- The State Museum Auschwitz-Birkenau, Poland, "Angel of Auschwitz honoured" 2006 (PDF 109.5 KB) at the State Museum homepage
