= The Black Book (list) =

Britons to be arrested in Nazi Germany

A page from the Black Book (Sonderfahndungsliste G.B., page 231 Z): 4. August Zaleski; 10. Lucjan Żeligowski; 14. Frederick Everard Zeuner; 21. Sir Alfred Eckhard Zimmern; 26. Carl Zuckmayer; 28. Leonie Zuntz; 31. Stefan Zweig

The Sonderfahndungsliste G.B. ("Special Search List Great Britain") was a secret list of prominent British residents to be arrested and potentially executed, produced in 1940 by the Schutzstaffel (SS) as part of the preparation for the proposed invasion of Britain. After the war, the list became known as the Black Book.

The information was prepared by the Reich Security Main Office (RSHA) under Reinhard Heydrich. Later, SS-Oberführer Walter Schellenberg stated in his memoirs that he had compiled the list, starting at the end of June 1940. It contained 2,820 names of people, including British nationals and European exiles, who were to be immediately arrested by SS Einsatzgruppen upon the invasion, occupation and annexation of Great Britain to Nazi Germany. Abbreviations after each name indicated whether the individual was to be detained by RSHA Amt IV (the Gestapo) or Amt VI (Ausland-SD, Foreign Intelligence).

The list was printed as a supplement or appendix to the secret Informationsheft G.B. handbook, which Schellenberg also stated he had written. This handbook noted opportunities for looting, and named potentially dangerous anti-Nazi institutions including Masonic lodges, the Church of England and the Boy Scouts. On 17 September 1940, SS-Brigadeführer Franz Six was designated to a position in London where he would implement the post-invasion arrests and actions against institutions, but on the same day, Hitler postponed the invasion indefinitely. In September 1945, at the end of the war, the list was discovered in Berlin. Reporting included the reactions of some of the people listed.

== Background ==
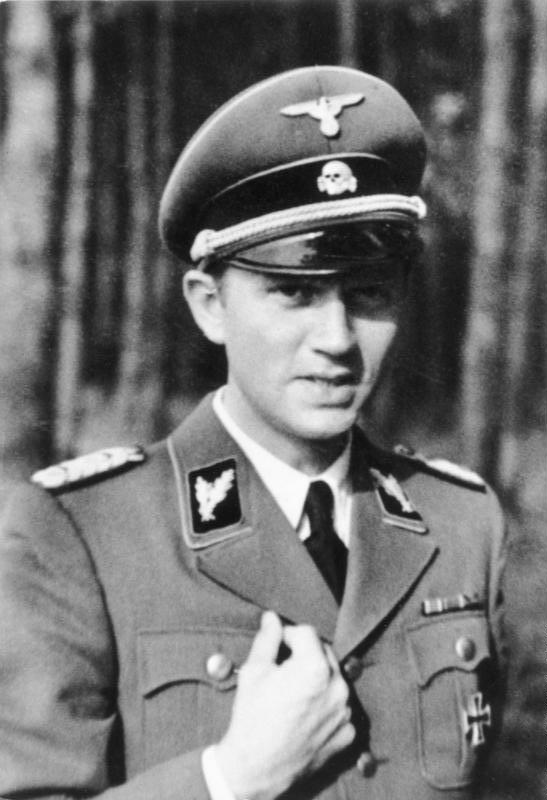
SS functionary Walter Schellenberg said he had compiled the Black Book

The list was similar to earlier lists prepared by the SS, such as the Special Prosecution Book-Poland (German: Sonderfahndungsbuch Polen) prepared before the Second World War by members of the German fifth column in cooperation with German Intelligence, and used to target the 61,000 Polish people on this list during Operation Tannenberg and Intelligenzaktion in occupied Poland between 1939 and 1941.

Rapid German victories led quickly to the fall of France, and British forces had to be withdrawn during the Dunkirk evacuation, with the Nazi spearhead reaching the coast on 21 May 1940. It was only then that the prospect of invading Britain was raised with Hitler, and the German high command did not issue any orders for preparations until 2 July. Eventually, on 16 July, Hitler issued his Directive no. 16 ordering preparation for invasion, codenamed Operation Sea Lion.

German intelligence set out to provide their invading forces with encyclopaedic handbooks giving useful information. Seven maps, each covering the whole of the British Isles, covered different topographical aspects. A book provided 174 photographs, mostly aerial photography, supplemented with views cut out from newspapers and magazines. A mass of information was included in a book on Military-Geographical Data about England. Only one book was marked secret, the Informationsheft GB. Walter Schellenberg wrote in his memoirs that "at the end of June 1940 I was ordered to prepare a small handbook for the invading troops and the political and administrative units that would accompany them, describing briefly the most important political, administrative and economic institutions of Great Britain and the leading public figures."

== Description ==
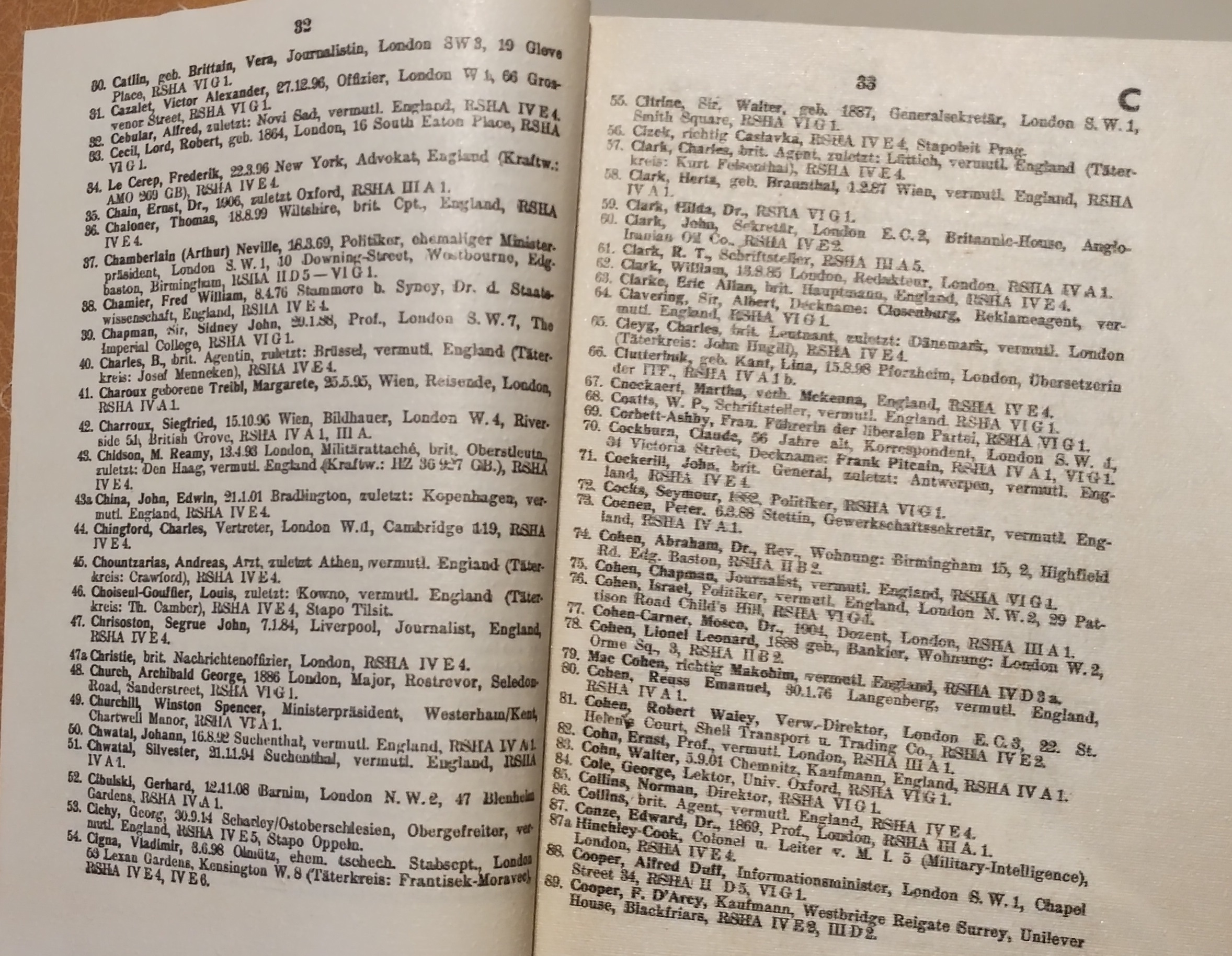
Pages 32 & 33 of the booklet. Names that can be seen include Winston Churchill and Neville Chamberlain.

The Sonderfahndungsliste G.B. was an appendix or supplement to the secret handbook Informationsheft Grossbritannien (Informationsheft GB), which provided information for German security services about institutions thought likely to resist the Nazis, including public schools, the Church of England and the Boy Scouts. A general survey of British museums and art galleries suggested opportunities for looting. The handbook described the organisation of the British police and had a section analysing the British intelligence agencies. Following this, four pages had around 30 passport-sized photographs of individuals who also appeared in the appendix.

The appendix, of 104 pages, was a list in alphabetical order of 2,820 names, some of which were duplicated. The term Fahndungsliste translates into "wanted list", and Sonderfahndungsliste into "specially" or "especially wanted list". The instructions "Sämtliche in der Sonderfahndungsliste G.B. aufgefürten Personen sind festzunehmen" ("all persons listed in the Special Wanted List G.B. are to be arrested") made this clear.

Beside each name was the number of the Reich Security Main Office (RSHA) to which the person was to be handed over. Churchill was to be placed into the custody of Amt VI (Ausland-SD, Foreign Intelligence), but the vast majority of the people listed in the Black Book would be placed into the custody of Amt IV (Gestapo). The book had some significant errors, such as people who had died (Lytton Strachey, died in 1932) or were no longer based in the UK (Paul Robeson, moved back to the United States in 1939), and omissions (such as George Bernard Shaw, one of the few English language writers whose works were published and performed in Nazi Germany).

The dimension of the booklet is given as 19 centimetres (7.5 in); "Geheim!" ("Secret!") is printed on the cover. The facsimile version shows the printing in red, on a pale grey-green cover and has 376 pages.

== Post-war discovery ==
A print run of the list produced around 20,000 booklets, but the warehouse in which they were stored was destroyed in a bombing raid, and only two originals are known to survive. One is in the Imperial War Museum in London, and one is noted in the Hoover Institution Library and Archives.

On 14 September 1945, The Guardian reported that the booklet had been discovered in the Berlin headquarters of the Reich Security Police (Reich Security Main Office). When told the previous day that they were on the Gestapo's list, Lady Astor ("enemy of Germany") said "It is the complete answer to the terrible lie that the so-called 'Cliveden Set' was pro-Fascist", while Lord Vansittart said "The German black-list might indicate to some of those who now find themselves on it that their views, divergent from mine, were somewhat misplaced. Perhaps it will be an eye-opener to them"; the cartoonist David Low said "That is all right. I had them on my list too."

Being included on the list was considered something of a mark of honour. Noël Coward recalled that, on learning of the book, Rebecca West sent him a telegram saying "My dear—the people we should have been seen dead with."

== Notable people listed ==
(All survived the war unless otherwise mentioned.)

- Lascelles Abercrombie, poet, literary critic and English language professor (erroneous listing as died in 1938)
- Richard Acland, "anti-Fascist Liberal M.P."
- David Adams, Labour politician (died 16 August 1943)
- Vyvyan Adams, Conservative Party politician
- Jennie Adamson, Labour politician
- Christopher Addison, 1st Viscount Addison, medical doctor and politician
- Friedrich Adler, Austrian socialist politician and revolutionary
- Henrietta Adler (listed as Nettie Adler), Jewish Liberal politician
- Max Aitken, Lord Beaverbrook, Anglo-Canadian business tycoon, listed as "Beaverbrock"
- Leopold Amery, Conservative politician and journalist
- Fergus Anderson, two-time Grand Prix motorcycle road-racing World Champion
- Sir Norman Angell, Labour MP awarded the Nobel Peace Prize in 1933
- Frederick Antal, born Frigyes Antal, later known as Friedrich Antal, Jewish Hungarian art historian
- John Jacob Astor, 1st Baron Astor of Hever, American-born English newspaper proprietor, politician, sportsman and military officer
- Nancy Astor, Viscountess Astor, American-born English socialite and Conservative MP, listed as "enemy of Germany"
- Katharine Stewart-Murray, Duchess of Atholl (listed as Catherine, Duchess of Athol), Scottish Unionist Party politician, supporter of Republican Spain and outspoken opponent of fascism ("the Red Duchess")
- Clement Attlee, featured twice, as "Attlee, Clement Richard, major", and as "Attlee, Clemens, leader Labour party"
- Robert Baden-Powell, founder and leader of Scouting, which the Nazis regarded as a spy organisation (died 8 January 1941)
- Edvard Beneš, President of the Czechoslovak government in exile
- J. D. Bernal, scientist and communist
- Violet Bonham Carter, anti-fascist Liberal politician. Referred to as "an Encirclement lady politician"
- William Henry Bragg, physicist, chemist, mathematician, sportsman and Nobel prize winner (died 12 March 1942)
- Vera Brittain, feminist writer and pacifist
- Fenner Brockway, socialist and politician.
- "Harry Bullock", thought to be a mistake for Guy Henry Bullock, diplomat and Everest mountaineer
- Neville Chamberlain, "political, former prime minister" (died 9 November 1940)
- Sydney Chapman, economist and civil servant
- Winston Churchill, prime minister
- Sir Walter Citrine, trade unionist
- Marthe Cnockaert, First World War spy
- Pierre Coalfleet (listed as Coralfleet), pseudonym of Frank Davison, writer, associated with prewar modernist and gay circles in Berlin
- Claud Cockburn, journalist
- Seymour Cocks, Labour politician
- Chapman Cohen, secularist writer and editor
- Lionel Leonard Cohen, lawyer
- Robert Waley Cohen, industrialist
- G. D. H. Cole, socialist economic historian
- Norman Collins, broadcasting executive
- Edward Conze, Anglo-German scholar
- Duff Cooper, Minister of Information
- Margery Corbett Ashby, feminist
- Noël Coward, high-profile actor and armed forces entertainer who opposed appeasement; connections with MI5
- Sir Stafford Cripps, Labour politician
- Nancy Cunard, writer, heiress and anti-fascist
- Frederick Francis Charles Curtis, architect, trained in Germany
- Sefton Delmer, Germanophone journalist and propagandist
- Peter Drucker, Viennese-born Jewish economist (resident in US)
- Anthony Eden, Secretary of State for War
- Jacob Epstein, sculptor
- Lion Feuchtwanger, German Jewish novelist and playwright
- Frank Foley, spy who as MI6 Head of Station in pre-war Berlin rescued thousands of German Jews
- E. M. Forster, novelist
- Sigmund Freud, Jewish founder of psychoanalysis (died 23 September 1939)
- Willie Gallacher MP, trade unionist and communist politician
- Charles de Gaulle, Free French leader and general, listed as "former French General"
- Sir Philip Gibbs, journalist (war correspondent) and novelist
- Victor Gollancz, leftist publisher
- J. B. S. Haldane, geneticist, evolutionary biologist and communist
- Ernst Hanfstaengl, German refugee; once a financial backer of Hitler, he had fallen from favour and had fled Germany in 1937
- Aldous Huxley, author (had emigrated to US in 1936)
- C. E. M. Joad, philosopher and educator
- Egon Erwin Kisch, Austrian-Czechoslovak Jewish writer and journalist, listed as "Egon Erwin Kich"
- Alexander Korda, Hungarian-born British film producer and director
- George Lansbury, Labour politician, "rules German emigrant political circles" (died 7 May 1940)
- Harold Laski, Jewish Labour political theorist, economist and author
- Megan Lloyd George, politician, daughter of David Lloyd George (who was not on the list)
- David Low, political cartoonist and caricaturist
- F. L. Lucas, literary critic, writer and anti-fascist campaigner
- Harold Macmillan, Conservative politician and future prime minister
- Geoffrey Mander, Liberal politician, critic of Appeasement and crusader on behalf of the League of Nations), manufacturer and art collector
- Heinrich Mann, German novelist and anti-fascist (in exile on continent, to US in 1940)
- Jan Masaryk, foreign minister of the Czechoslovak government in exile
- Jimmy Maxton, pacifist politician
- Naomi Mitchison, novelist
- Gilbert Murray, classical scholar and activist for the League of Nations
- Harold Nicolson, as "Nicholson", diplomat, author and diarist
- Philip Noel-Baker, Labour politician and pacifist
- Conrad O'Brien-ffrench, SIS/MI6 Agent ST36, Agent Z3 for Dansey's Z Organization
- Vic Oliver, British actor and radio comedian, originally from Austria and married to Winston Churchill's daughter Sarah, listed as "Olivier, Jewish actor".
- Ignacy Jan Paderewski, pianist, former prime minister of Poland (died 29 June 1941)
- R. Palme Dutt, journalist and theoretician of the Communist Party of Great Britain
- Sylvia Pankhurst, suffragist, writer, journalist and anti-fascist
- Nikolaus Pevsner, German (later British) architectural historian
- Michael Polanyi, British polymath, originally from Hungary
- Harry Pollitt, General Secretary of the Communist Party of Great Britain
- Thomas Hildebrand Preston, 6th Baronet, diplomat
- J. B. Priestley, creator of anti-Nazi popular broadcasts and fiction
- Eleanor Rathbone MP, activist for assistance to refugees
- Hermann Rauschning, German refugee and once personal friend of Hitler who had turned against him
- Douglas Reed, journalist and author
- Paul Robeson, African-American singer/actor with strong Communist affiliations (returned to US September 1939)
- Maude Royden, suffragist, author, preacher and philosopher, pacifist
- Sir Thomas Royden, director and former chairman of Cunard Line (brother of Maude Royden)
- Helen Rosenau, academic, feminist, and historian of art and architecture
- Bertrand Russell, philosopher, historian and pacifist
- Duncan Sandys, Conservative politician listed as "Dunkan Sandys", married to Winston Churchill's daughter Diana
- John Segrue, foreign correspondent for the News Chronicle (died in German captivity 11 September 1942)
- Adolf Schallamach, scientist
- Dr. Francis Simon, German (later British) physical chemist and physicist
- Sir Archibald Sinclair, Liberal politician, Secretary of State for Air from 1940
- Robert Smallbones, diplomat who granted visas to 48,000 Jews, recognised in 2010 as a British Hero of the Holocaust
- Aline Atherton-Smith, Quaker
- C. P. Snow, physicist and novelist
- Stephen Spender, leftish poet, novelist and essayist
- Lytton Strachey, writer and critic (had died 1932)
- Sybil Thorndike, actress
- Frank Cyril Tiarks, banker, director of the Bank of England, member British Union of Fascists and Anglo-German Fellowship.
- Gottfried Reinhold Treviranus, politician, former German minister
- Lord Vansittart, "leadership of British Intelligence Service, Chief Diplomatic Adviser to the Foreign Office"
- Beatrice Webb, socialist and economist (died 30 April 1943)
- Chaim Weizmann, Russian-born British lecturer and Zionist leader who had worked in Germany; later President of Israel
- H. G. Wells, author and socialist
- Rebecca West, suffragist and writer
- Ted Willis, dramatist
- Leonard Woolf, political theorist, author, publisher and civil servant, husband of Virginia Woolf
- Virginia Woolf, novelist and essayist, wife of Leonard Woolf (suicide 28 March 1941)
- Alfred Zimmern, classical scholar, historian and political scientist
- Carl Zuckmayer, German writer and playwright
- Leonie Zuntz, German Hittitologist, refugee scholar at Somerville College, Oxford (suicide 14 December 1942)
- Stefan Zweig, Austrian Jewish writer (suicide on 23 February 1942 in Brazil)

== See also ==
- Special Prosecution Book-Poland (German: Sonderfahndungsbuch Polen)
- Dr. Franz Six, SS official appointed by Reinhard Heydrich to direct state police operations in German-occupied Great Britain.
- Bibliography of the Holocaust § Primary Sources

== Bibliography ==
- Schellenberg, Walter (2001). Invasion 1940: The Nazi Invasion Plan for Britain. St Ermin's Press. ISBN 978-0-9536151-3-1. OCLC 45488085.
  Schellenberg, Walter (2000). Invasion 1940: The Nazi Invasion Plan for Britain. Little, Brown Book Group. ISBN 978-0-3168531-5-6. OCLC 43341989.
- Shirer, William L. (1964). "Chapter 22: If the invasion had succeeded". The Rise and Fall of the Third Reich. Pan Books. pp. 936–940. OCLC 462490002. – Discusses the black book and its contents.
  Shirer, William L. (23 October 2011). The Rise and Fall of the Third Reich. RosettaBooks. ISBN 978-0-7953-1700-2. OCLC 995602547.
- Fleming, Peter (1975). Operation Sea Lion : an account of the German preparations and the British counter-measures. London: Pan Books. ISBN 0-330-24211-3.
- Guardian (14 September 1945). "Nazi's black list discovered in Berlin". Guardian Century - 1940-1949.
- Forces War Records (28 February 2017). "Hitler's Black Book – List of Persons Wanted". Archived from the original on 1 March 2017. – complete list of names
- Hoover Institution Library. "Die Sonderfahndungsliste G.B." Hoover Institution Library and Archives. "Vault DA585 .A1 G37 (V), 376 p. 19 cm. On cover: Geheim!, 'Gestapo arrest list for England' in ms. on cover."
- Imperial War Museums. "Die Sonderfahndungsliste G.B. : [the Black Book] (LBY 89 / 1936)".
  - Black Book: Sonderfahndungsliste G.B. Facsimile reprint series (in German). London: Imperial War Museum, Department of Printed Books. 1989. ISBN 978-0-901627-51-3. "Facsimile reprint of the original produced by the Reichssicher-heitshauptamt in May 1940. It features an introduction explaining the origins of the 'Special Search List GB'. Original (41820) in Special Collection"
