= Henk Huffener =

Henk Huffener (born Henricus Josef Anthonius Huffener; 24 February 1923 – 5 November 2006) was a Dutch-born British art dealer, gallery founder, and member of the Dutch Resistance during World War II. He was posthumously recognized as a British Hero of the Holocaust for his efforts to aid Jews during the Nazi occupation. After emigrating to the United Kingdom, he established a prominent antiques business in Surrey and later founded the Herbert Rieser Memorial Gallery in London.

== Personal life ==
He was born in Utrecht, The Netherlands 24 Feb 1923 and died 5 Nov 2006 in Albury, Surrey, England.

He married Margaret Perrott in 1950. They had one son, Guy S Huffener, and one daughters, Clare Louise Huffener. and Josephine E M Huffener

== Dutch Resistance ==
He was posthumously awarded the British Hero of the Holocaust which was initiated by the Holocaust Educational Trust to recognise British citizens who through their actions saved Jews and others. His daughter Jo Huffener was interviewed by Agnes Grunwald-Spier authored the book The Other Schindlers

== Career ==
He established an antiques business The Old Pharmacy in Albury, Surrey in 1959

In 1980 he reopened Herbert F Rieser's shop in 20 New Quebec Street, London, W1 as the Herbert Rieser Memorial Gallery Early exhibitions included Art Attack (10 April - 7 May 1981) featuring Susan Bowen-Morris, Mary Farmer (1940-2021, UK), Peter Hall, John Holden (artist), Terry Moores (1949-2014 UK) and Ian Walters.

== Links for further research ==
- Imperial War Museum Interview with Henricus Josef Anthonius Huffener
- Traces of War profile
- News clippings from Newspapers.com
- Henk Huffener interviews from the Imperial War Museum at Brunton Museum
