= June Ravenhall =

British Hero of the Holocaust

June Ravenhall (1901–1984) is one of the British Heroes of the Holocaust and Righteous Among the Nations. She was given that distinction for her efforts at saving Jewish lives during the Holocaust.

== Early life ==
Ravenhall was born Elsie June Stickley in 1901. She was a native of Kenilworth who moved to The Hague with her husband, Leslie Ravenhall, whom she married in 1925. The couple left Coventry for the Netherlands due to Les Ravenhall's business, and started a business importing Coventry Eagle motorbikes.

== Wartime resistance ==
Their house and business were expropriated when the Nazis invaded the Netherlands. As a British citizen, and since Britain was then in war with Germany, June's husband was sent to a prison camp in Poland, and she relocated to Hilversum.

Despite the danger, she sheltered a young Jewish man, Louis Velleman, in her home, at the request of the Dutch resistance. In 2007, 23 years after her death, three of her children accepted a medal and certificate on her behalf at a ceremony at the Israeli Embassy in London.
