= Harold 'Bill' Scruton =

British soldier; British Hero of the Holocaust

Harold Scruton (born 18 November 1907 in Wakefield, Yorkshire – 1987) was a British soldier who posthumously received the British Hero of the Holocaust award and was declared Righteous Among the Nations by the Yad Vashem.

== Biography ==
Harold 'Bill' Scruton ('Buster') was born in Wakefield on 18 November 1907 and married his wife Ivy in Ripon in 1935. Serving with the Royal Artillery, Scruton was sent to France with the British Expeditionary Force and was captured by German forces in 1940. He then was sent East to work on farms near the Baltic coast and as of 1945 was being held in Stalag XX-B, Gross Golmkau, 30 km south of Gdańsk.

== Saving Sarah Matuson ==
In 1945 in the latter labour camp, a fellow prisoner Stan Wells found 16-year-old Sarah Matuson hiding in a barn.

Sarah, a Lithuanian Jew from Shavli, along with her mother, Gita, and sister, Hannah, were 3 of 300 survivors of a forced march of 1,200 women from Stutthof Concentration Camp. Compelled to escape by her mother, Sarah succeeded in leaving the line in search of food but was spotted by locals and took refuge in the barn. Severely undernourished and exhausted, Sarah was discovered by Wells who informed her that the locals had given up their search. He reassured her and returned with food and, with the help of his fellow prisoners, Scruton included, smuggled Sarah into Stalag XX-B.

For around three weeks, Scruton and the others hid Sarah in the hayloft of a barn that housed the horses of the local police station and despite the risk of discovery, nursed her back to health. They left Sarah in the care of a sympathetic local woman when they were ordered on a forced march themselves, though advancing Russian forces soon liberated all involved.

Sarah discovered later that her family had not survived the war and in memory of her sister she added ‘Hannah’ to her name. She moved to live with an uncle and started a new life, training as a nurse, marrying William Rigler, a New York Supreme Court Judge, and having two children.

== Aftermath and remembrance ==
Though eager to trace the men who had saved her life, Sarah only remembered one full name of the ten British prisoners: Alan Edwards. After a long search and with the assistance of the British War Records Office, Sarah made contact with Edwards, and in 1973, the group reunited.

The efforts of Stan Wells, George Hammond, Tommy Noble, Alan Edwards, Roger Letchford, Bill Scruton, Bill Keeble, Bert Hambling, Jack Buckley, and Willy Fisher were recognized by Yad Vashem, the Jewish organization which safeguards the memory and meaning of the Holocaust for future generations. They were awarded a medal and the title of Righteous Among the Nations.

In 2013, six of the group's families were identified and given the posthumous award of British Hero of the Holocaust. Scruton's nieces, Mavis Shaw and Barbara Topham were traced and awarded his medal which is now on permanent display in the Eden Camp Medal Room.

Sarah published the book Ten British Soldiers Saved My Life under her new name of Hannah Sarah Rigler in 2007.
