= Informationsheft Grossbritannien =

Informationsheft Grossbritannien, also known as Informationsheft G.B. (in English Information Brochure Great Britain), was a book produced by Nazi Germany in preparation for the invasion of Great Britain, Operation Sea Lion, during World War II. It is commonly thought to have been compiled by SS-Brigadeführer Walter Friedrich Schellenberg, but some sources suggest alternately Major Walter zu Christian, or a team.

The manual covers useful information for an occupying force, such as British geography, economics, the political system, form of government, political parties, legal system, civil administration, armed forces, universities, police, important museums, press and radio, religion, ethnic groups, and trade unions. The section "Der Britische Nachrichtendienst" gave details of many members of the staff working for the Secret Intelligence Service (SIS), including passport photographs of some of its officers.

A supplement to the book, "Sonderfahndungsliste G.B.", the "Special Wanted List, GB" (also known as "The Black Book") is a list of prominent British residents to be arrested after a successful invasion by Nazi Germany.

== Bibliography ==
- Schellenberg, Walter (2000). Invasion 1940. London & New York: St.Ermin's Press & Little, Brown. ISBN 978-0953615131.
