= Lena Lakomy =

Survivor of Nazi concentration camps; British Hero of the Holocaust

Helena Lakomy (née Bankier) (20 November 1917 – 21 November 2010) was a survivor of Nazi concentration camps. She was posthumously recognised as a British Hero of the Holocaust in 2013.

== Early life ==
Lena Bankier came from a well-off Jewish family in Warsaw. In the German occupation of Poland during the Second World War, Lena and her family were moved into the Warsaw Ghetto in 1940. She married Symcha Mańkowski there and, shortly afterwards, they were transported to Białystok Ghetto. They were deported to Auschwitz concentration camp in February 1943 and her husband was sent to his death on arrival. At Auschwitz she gave her name as Lena Hankwoska and thanks to risks taken by Polish prisoners during the registration procedure, they convinced the German officers that she had been wrongly registered as a Jewish prisoner. Due to her ‘Aryan looks’ she was re-categorised as a non-Jewish Polish political prisoner and sent to the Polish block. Lena was assigned to work as a nurse at the camp hospital. In this role she saved another prisoner, Hela Frank, from selection to the gas chambers.

Lena herself was saved by a Polish political prisoner, Maria Kotarba. Lena came to call her Mateczka ('Mother'). Kotarba looked after Lena when she was ill, bringing her extra food and medicine. Kotarba also managed to arrange lighter work for Lena through bribing a guard. In January 1945, Lena, along with the other surviving Auschwitz prisoners were sent on a death march to Ravensbrück concentration camp. Kotarba found her almost dead in the snow and carried her to her own barracks. In February 1945, the SS again moved the prisoners to the Neustadt-Glewe sub-camp, where the Red Army liberated the women in May 1945.

== Post-war ==
After the camp was liberated, Lena met a Polish army officer, Wladyslaw Łakomy, whom she married in Paris. They settled in the UK under the Polish Resettlement Act 1947. Wladyslaw, a former lawyer, worked in the docks in Middlesbrough. In the 1960s, the couple and their three children moved to London. She became a British citizen.

In the 1960s she began looking for Maria Kotarba and in 1997 discovered that she had died in Poland in December 1956. Lena pushed for Kotarba to be recognised by Yad Vashem as a Righteous Among the Nations, with the title being granted to Kotarba on 18 September 2005.

Her memories were recorded by the Imperial War Museum in 2002. In 2005, she was one of the survivors of Auschwitz who joined the Queen and prime minister to commemorate the 60th anniversary of the concentration camp's liberation.

Lena Lakomy died in November 2010, aged 93. For her actions in saving Hela Frank, as well as proffering medicines and delivering coded messages, Lena was posthumously awarded the British Hero of the Holocaust in 2010.
