= AJR Refugee Voices Testimony Archive =

Jewish history archive

AJR Refugee Voices Testimony Archive is the oral history collection of The Association of Jewish Refugees (AJR). It contains 300+ oral history video interviews with Jewish survivors of National Socialism living in the United Kingdom.

== Description ==
=== Origin and interviewees ===
The archive contains a total of 450 hours of interviews with more than 300 interviewees. The project was commissioned by The Association of Jewish Refugees in 2003 and was founded by Dr Anthony Grenville and Dr Bea Lewkowicz. Today it is run by its director, Dr Bea Lewkowicz. The interviews mainly involved people who had not yet been interviewed or had only rarely been interviewed as part of other projects. The interviews are conducted in English.

Most of the interviewees are themselves members of the AJR. Most of them were born in Germany and Austria, and immigrated to Great Britain during or after the National Socialist era. In addition to life in Nazi Germany and in the countries occupied by Germany, the interviews particularly describe experiences of migration and exile. The interviewees talk about escape attempts and the Kindertransport, separation from family members, arriving in a foreign country and learning a new language, living with memories of home and family, and coping with everyday life in Great Britain during and after the war. The interviews particularly focus on reports about experiences of emigration and integration into British society.

The Archive contains interviews with many prominent refugees and their descendants, including the parents of Daniel Finkelstein, who cited the Archive as a key resource for his book about his family.

=== Intended use and format ===
The archive is specifically designed for use in education and research. The video interviews are fully transcribed, with the transcriptions being provided with a time code that makes it easy to find the corresponding points in the video recordings and vice versa. In addition, a database contains biographical information on the interviewees, which is structured in 44 different categories, such as place of birth, profession, migration route and concentration camp. There is also a summary for each interview, and still images showing photos of family members, acquaintances and friends as well as other relevant objects and documents.

The archive has been used to study how refugee children experience learning new languages after resettlement. Academic Andrea Hammel noted that due to the self-reported nature of the archive, it cannot be considered a holistic representation of the experiences of Jewish refugees.

=== Access ===
Photos, interview summaries, biographical information and short clips can be accessed via the project's website. Full unedited access to the video interviews and their transcripts is available via the project's institutional partners. These include Wiener Holocaust Library, Mémorial de la Shoah, German Historical Institute London, Freie Universitaet Berlin and Yad Vashem.
