= Robert Smallbones =

British diplomat and humanitarian

Robert Smallbones CMG MBE
- Born: Robert Townsend Smallbones; 19 March 1884; Vienna, Austria
- Died: 29 May 1976 (aged 92); São Paulo, Brazil
- Education: Trinity College, Oxford
- Occupations: Diplomat and humanitarian
- Spouse: Inga Gjertson
- Children: 2
- Military career
- Allegiance: United Kingdom
- Awards: Companion of the Order of St Michael and St George; Member of the Order of the British Empire Civil Division

Robert Townsend Smallbones CMG MBE (19 March 1884 – 29 May 1976) was a British diplomat and humanitarian who arranged the issue of visas to persecuted Jewish people in Germany before the Second World War and visited Nazi concentration camps to demand the release of prisoners. He was posthumously recognised as a British Hero of the Holocaust in 2013.

== Early life ==
Robert Smallbones was the second son of Paul Smallbones of Schloss Velm, Austria.

He was educated at Trinity College, Oxford and received a Master of Arts degree.

== Consular service ==
Smallbones joined the British Foreign Office (Consular Service) on 13 October 1910, and served as Vice-Consul in Portuguese West Africa (present-day Angola), where he was active in work to bring an end to slavery. On 24 December 1914 he was appointed Consul at Stavanger in Norway. Smallbones was appointed a Member of the Order of the British Empire in the 1918 Birthday Honours. On 11 January 1920 he was appointed British Consul for the State of Bavaria, resident in Munich, Germany, then on 16 July 1922 Consul for Slovakia and Ruthenia, resident at Bratislava, during which time he was British Delegate to the Donau Commission.

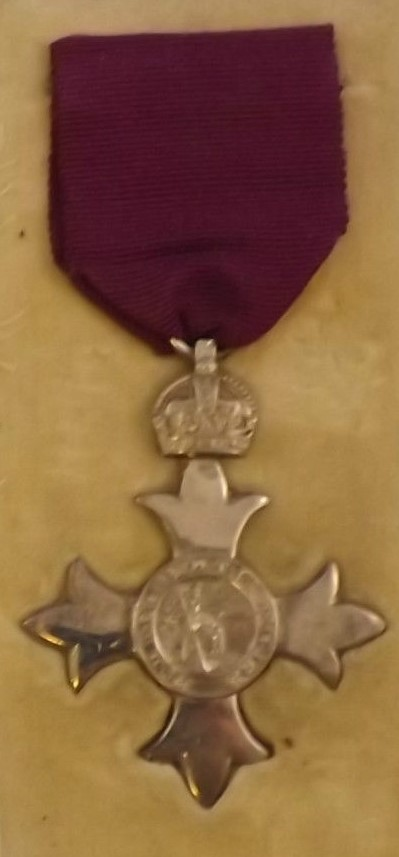
Member of the Order of the British Empire

Known at the Foreign Office in London as "Bones" he ruffled relations with his outspoken criticism of the Slovak government policy against minority groups and in 1923 and 1924 he made extensive tours of Slovakia and Carpathian Ruthenia to report to London on the situation.

Smallbones was appointed Consul for the Republic of Liberia, resident in Monrovia on 5 January 1926, then for Portuguese West Africa, resident in Luanda from 11 August 1927, and for the Banovinas of Dravska, Savaka and Primorska, resident in Zagreb from 21 June 1931.

== Service in Nazi Germany ==
He was promoted after the successful posting to Zagreb and appointed Consul-General at Frankfurt in Germany in 1932, just before the Nazi Party gained power. Smallbones held his position through the difficult pre-war years and in September 1939, at the outbreak of World War II, he was evacuated with all British diplomatic staff. After Kristallnacht in November 1938, he worked to assist persecuted Jewish people, gaining them travel visas, which would enable them to leave Nazi Germany by exploiting any opportunities the system allowed and some which it did not. He was remembered in the Jewish Chronicle as "the diplomat who faced down the Gestapo", for visiting Nazi concentration camps to demand the release of Jewish people. He provided refuge for hundreds of Jewish people in his official residence. On one occasion his daughter Irene horse-whipped Gestapo agents arresting a Jew. Frustrated at the refusal of the United States to issue visas to the Jews, he masterminded and oversaw what became known as the "Smallbones Scheme" to extend British efforts to evacuate Jews from Germany. The visa scheme enabled people to secure refuge in Britain for two years before going on to the US; it was approved by the UK Government without publicity and without the specific sanction of Parliament. In October 1939 the British Government calculated that he had saved 48,000 people and had been in the process of issuing papers to 50,000 more when war broke out.

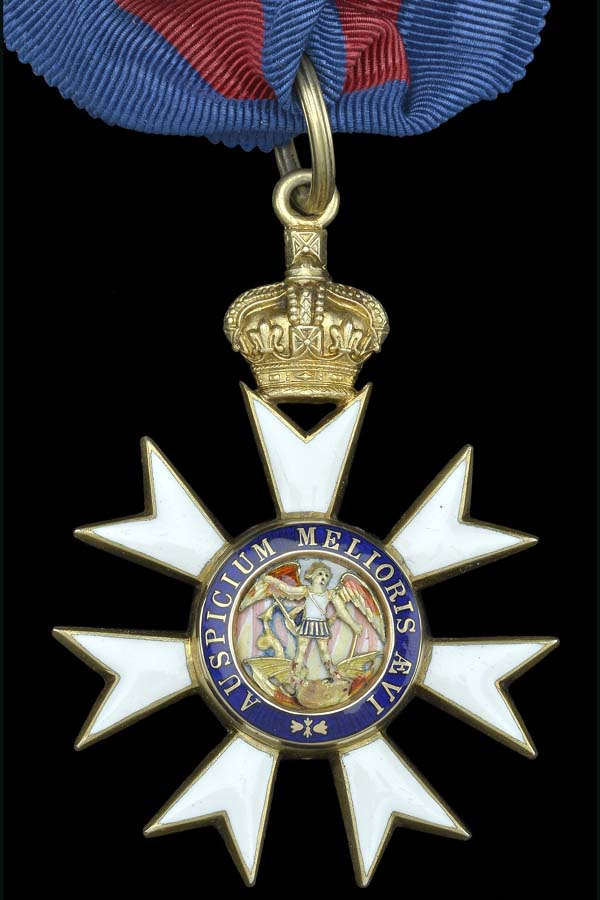
CMG award

In a letter dated 1938, Smallbones claimed that "The explanation for this outbreak of sadistic cruelty may be that sexual perversion, in particular homo-sexuality, are very prevalent in Germany."

His activities assisting Jewish people were documented by the Gestapo and he is named in the Black Book (the Sonderfahndungsliste G.B. or "Special Search List Great Britain"), a list of prominent British residents to be arrested upon the successful invasion of Britain by Nazi Germany in 1940. The Black Book contained the names of 2,820 people—British subjects and European exiles—living in Britain, who were to be immediately arrested upon the success of Operation Sea Lion, the invasion of Great Britain. The book states which German authority each arrested person was to be handed to and Smallbones was required by Department IVE4 of the Gestapo.

In 2013 Smallbones was posthumously awarded the medal of a British Hero of the Holocaust. In 2024, he was posthumously awarded the Congressional Gold Medal, the joint-highest civilian award in the United States.

== Wartime years ==
The Smallbones family sailed from London aboard the passenger liner SS Avila Star on 20 December 1939 bound for Brazil. From 11 January 1940 until he retired in 1945 he was Consul-General at São Paulo in Brazil.

Smallbones was appointed a Companion of the Order of St Michael and St George on 2 June 1943 for his service as Consul-General at São Paulo.

After his retirement in 1945 Smallbones and his wife settled in Brazil and occasionally visited England aboard RMS Andes.

== Family life ==
He married Inga Gjertson (1890–1988) of Kinn, Norway, and they had a son and a daughter. Their son Lieutenant Robert Peter Smallbones died on 17 May 1941, in Egypt; he is buried at the Cairo War Memorial Cemetery.

Smallbones died on 29 May 1976 in São Paulo, Brazil.

== Honours and awards ==
- Companion of the Order of St Michael and St George in June 1943 as Consul-General in São Paulo.
- Member of the Order of the British Empire in January 1918 as Vice-Consul in Stavanger, Norway.
- British Hero of the Holocaust, posthumously in 2013.
- Congressional Gold Medal, posthumously in 2024.

== Commemoration ==
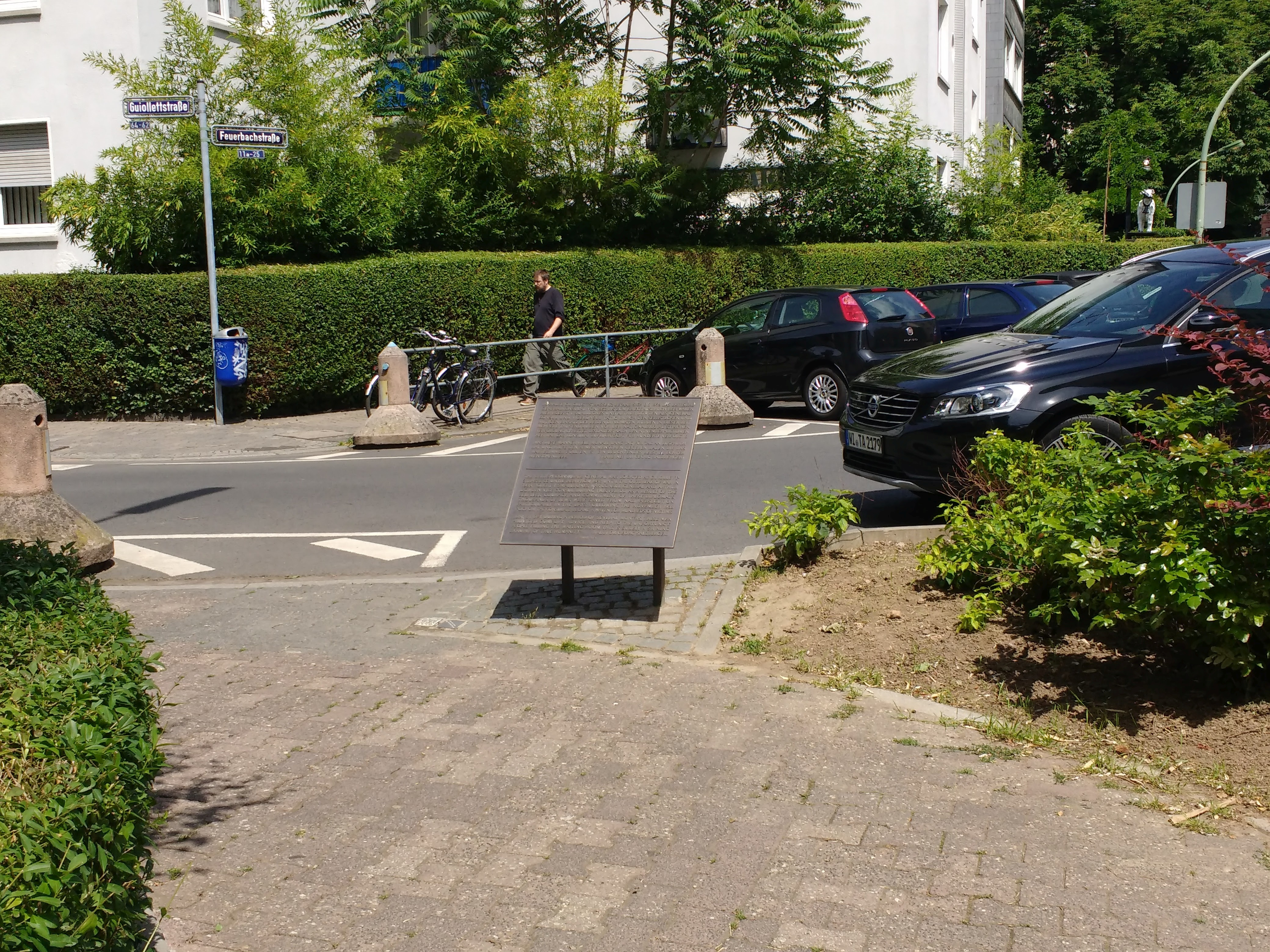
The plaque in Frankfurt commemorates the help that the two British diplomats Smallbones and Dowden provided to Jewish people from their consulate to enable them to escape Nazi Germany.

A plaque at the Foreign and Commonwealth Office in London was unveiled on 20 November 2008, naming him and seven other British diplomats who had worked to assist Jewish refugees.

In 2013 John Bercow, the Speaker of the House of Commons, unveiled a plaque to Smallbones and his vice-consul Arthur Dowden on the green fronting Golders Green Jewish Cemetery, one of London's largest Jewish cemeteries; Dowden was also recognised as a British Hero of the Holocaust in 2013. A similar plaque was unveiled in the presence of the then British Ambassador to Germany, Simon McDonald, and the Mayor of Frankfurt, Peter Feldmann at the site of the former British consulate general in Frankfurt.

== Bibliography ==
- Boehling, Rebecca (2011). Life and Loss in the Shadow of the Holocaust. Cambridge University Press. ISBN 978-0521899918.
- Fraser, Gordon (2012). The Quantum Exodus. Oxford University Press. ISBN 978-0199592159.
- Protheroe, Gerald J (2006). Searching for Security in a New Europe. Frank Cass publishing. ASIN B017QCIF5G.
- Miers, Suzanne (1989). The End of Slavery in Africa. University of Wisconsin Press. ISBN 0299115542.
- Smith, Lyn (2013). Heroes of the Holocaust. Ebury Press. ISBN 978-0091940683.
