= Leonie Zuntz =

German Hittitologist (1908–1942)

Leonie Zuntz (1908–1942) was a German Hittitologist who settled in Britain in 1934 as refugee scholar at Somerville College, Oxford. She was included in the Black Book, the list of British residents to be arrested after a Nazi invasion of Great Britain in 1940.

== Life ==
Leonie Zuntz was from a family of Jewish descent, although her grandfather Nathan Zuntz (1847–1920) had converted to Christianity. In the 1920s she was romantically involved with Elias Joseph Bickerman. In the late 1920s, while studying at the Ludwig-Maximilians-Universität München, she befriended the orientalist Fritz Rudolf Kraus. After gaining her doctorate, she immigrated to England in 1934. Settling in Oxford, she taught German at Somerville College and worked for Oxford University Press. In 1934-1935 she introduced Oliver Gurney to Hittite. She committed suicide in 1942, at 12, Norham Gardens, Oxford, and died at the Radcliffe Infirmary. Her estate was administered by Anna Edith Zuntz, a widow.

== Works ==
- Die hethitischen Ortsadverbien arha, parā, piran als selbständige Adverbien und in ihrer Verbindung mit Nomina und Verba, Speyer a. Rh. : Pilger-Druckerei, 1936
