= Dansey =

Dansey is a surname. Notable people with the surname include:

- Claude Dansey (1876–1947) aka Colonel Z, Haywood, Uncle Claude
- Harry Dansey (1920–1979), New Zealand Māori journalist, cartoonist, writer, and broadcaster
- William Dansey (1792–1856), Church of England clergyman
