= Association of Jewish Refugees =

British social welfare agency

The Association of Jewish Refugees
- Founded: July 1941
- Type: Social welfare agency
- Location: Winston House, 2 Dollis Park, London N3 1HF United Kingdom
- Region served: United Kingdom
- Members: ca. 2000
- Key people: Chairman: Andrew Kaufman; Chief Executive: Michael Newman
- Employees: ca. 40
- Volunteers: ca. 120
- Website: www.ajr.org.uk

The Association of Jewish Refugees (AJR) is the specialist nationwide social and welfare services charity representing and supporting Jewish victims of Nazi oppression, and their dependants and descendants, living in Great Britain.

== Historical overview ==
The AJR was established on 20 July 1941 to support and represent the interests of the estimated 70,000 Jewish Refugees from German-speaking countries who fled to Britain to escape Nazi oppression before the Second World War. This number includes approximately 10,000 children who fled Nazi-controlled Germany, Austria and Czechoslovakia to Britain on the Kindertransport between December 1938 and August 1939.

As well as the refugees who arrived prior to the outbreak of the Second World War, AJR membership today includes several groups of post-war Jewish refugees from Europe including survivors from concentration camps and ghettos, child survivors as well as those who survived in hiding.

The children and grandchildren of refugees and survivors, the Second and Third Generations, are also entitled to be AJR members.

== Social and welfare services ==
The AJR has specialist social and care workers dedicated to the daily needs of AJR members who require support and guidance on a wide range of social, welfare and care requirements.

As part of their nationwide programme of home visits, social care workers assess members' needs and, where appropriate, eligibility for a number of financial support schemes, designed to enable members to continue to live with dignity, comfort and security in their own homes for as long as possible. Meals-on-wheels deliveries are made once a week for members living in certain areas in London.

On behalf of the Conference on Jewish Material Claims Against Germany the AJR administers emergency social, welfare and care funds, which can be used to pay for a number of services and essential items including dental treatment and specialist clothing as well as urgent house repairs, recuperative convalescence and respite breaks. The largest proportion of these funds are used to support the Homecare programme.

== Outreach programme ==
The AJR operates a nationwide network of 44 regional groups that offer members a unique opportunity to socialize with friends of similar backgrounds. Through this outreach programme the AJR has reunited former friends and acquaintances from more than 60 years ago.

In addition to organising local meetings, outings, coffee mornings, garden and tea parties, AJR outreach co-ordinators also arrange national and regional get-togethers.

== Restitution and compensation claims ==
The AJR offers advice and assistance with claims for Holocaust-era compensation and the restitution of appropriated assets. As well as information about pensions, property and insurance policies, help is available for enquiries related to dormant bank accounts and lump sum reparations paid by individual governments or commissions. Although the deadlines for many reparation schemes have expired it is still possible to apply to certain programmes.

In addition to this guidance, the AJR lobbied the British Government to ensure that certain compensation awards are exempt from income, capital gains and inheritance taxes and that lump sum reparations are disregarded when calculating entitlement to social security benefits.

Through the Claims Conference, AJR assisted former forced and slave labourers with their claims to receive compensation from the Foundation "Remembrance, Responsibility and Future".

== Kindertransport ==
The Kindertransport (KT) is a special interest group of AJR. It represents those victims who arrived in Britain as children by Kindertransports fleeing from Nazi-occupied Germany, Austria and Czechoslovakia prior to the start of the Second World War. The group arranges monthly meetings including guest speakers and regular activities. Sir Erich Reich (d. 2022) was chairman of the Kindertransport planning committee.

== Child Survivors Association ==
The Child Survivors Association (CSA) is also a special interest group of the AJR. The CSA committee arranges for guest speakers and the group offers mutual support in a relaxed social atmosphere where members can come together to discuss their experiences. The CSA is an affiliated member of the World Federation of Jewish Child Survivors of the Holocaust.

== Holocaust education, research and AJR-supported projects ==
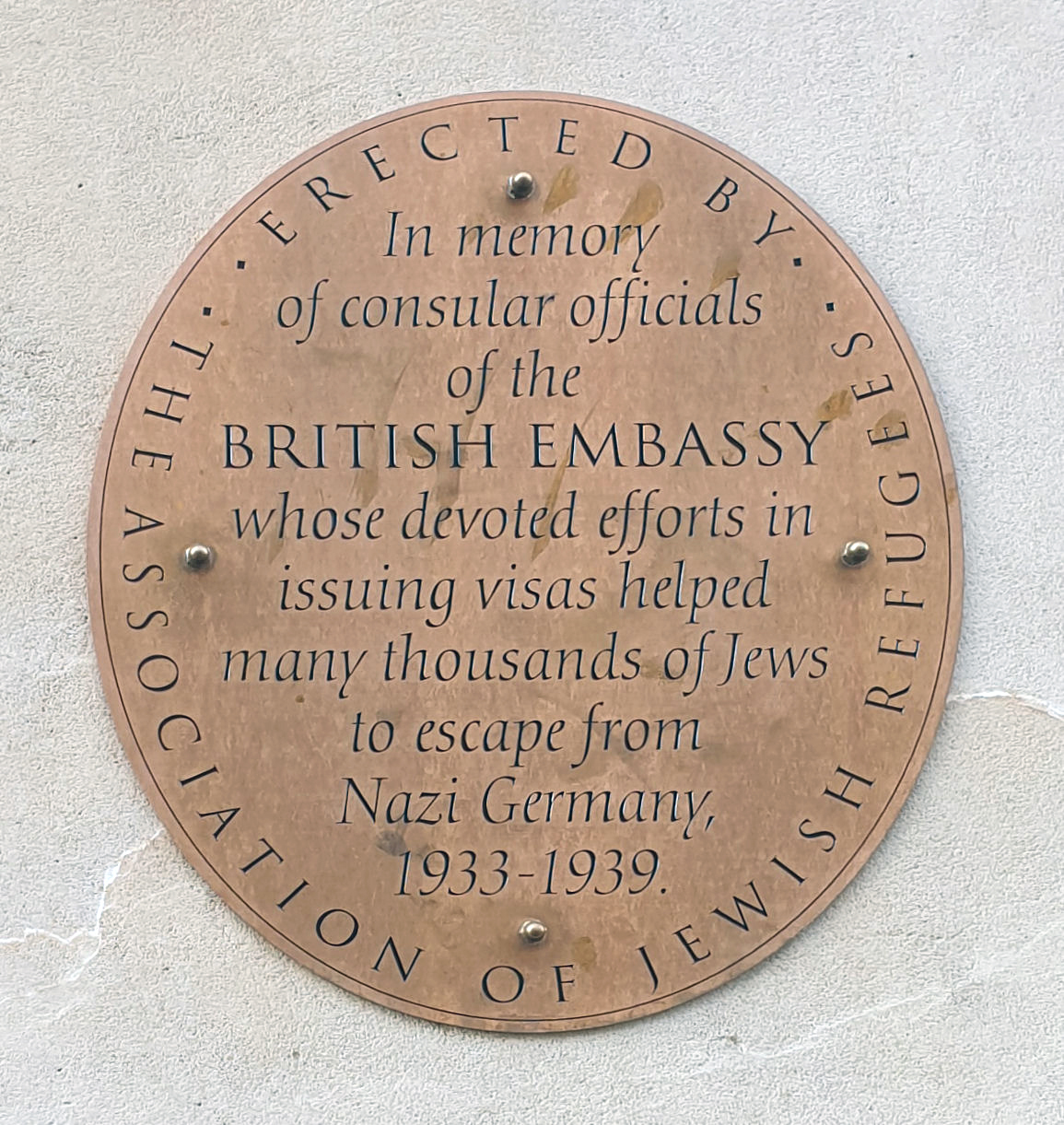
Plaque at the Embassy of the United Kingdom, Berlin, unveiled in 2020 by the Association of Jewish Refugees to honour the consular officials at the embassy

The AJR is committed to the education of future generations about the Holocaust. As well as supporting educational, research and commemorative projects, the AJR has produced several resources that will help create the legacy of the Jewish refugees and survivors shedding light on how they rebuilt their lives and their remarkable contribution to Britain.

The AJR Charitable Trust has given grants to institutions to develop programmes for the formal teaching of the Holocaust in schools, colleges and universities. It has also made grants to organisations that arrange and organise commemorative events, programmes and exhibitions.

=== AJR Refugee Voices Testimony Archive ===
AJR Refugee Voices Testimony Archive is an oral history collection containing 300+ oral history video interviews with Jewish survivors of National Socialism living in the United Kingdom. Funded by The AJR, the project was created by Dr Bea Lewkowicz and Dr Anthony Grenville, both children of Holocausts survivors and refugees from Nazism.

=== Memorial books ===
The AJR has produced a series of Holocaust Memorial Books that honour the families of individual AJR members living in different areas of the country.

=== The UK Holocaust Map ===
The UK Holocaust Map launched in December 2021. As of April 2024 it contains 682 records, 22 collections, and 3 walking trails. The map also contains co-curated collections from the Scottish Jewish Archive Centre, the Frank Falla Archive, the Wiener Holocaust Library, and the Anne Frank Trust UK.

The map was developed to highlight Britain’s relationship with the Holocaust at a national and local scale, as recommended for Holocaust education by the International Holocaust Remembrance Alliance in 2019.

== Publications ==
All members of AJR receive the monthly AJR Journal which combines topical news analysis with feature articles as well as book, theatre and film reviews along with the letters page. It also contains profiles of personalities with a connection to the refugee community and promotes forthcoming AJR events and activities.
