= British Hero of the Holocaust =

Award given by the UK government

The British Hero of the Holocaust award is a special national award given by the government of the United Kingdom in recognition of British citizens who assisted in rescuing victims of the Holocaust. On 9 March 2010, it was awarded to 27 individuals posthumously. The award is a solid silver medallion and bears the inscription "in the service of humanity" in recognition of "selfless actions" which "preserved life in the face of persecution".

== Campaign for official recognition ==
In 2008, a campaign to gain official posthumous recognition of British Holocaust rescuers was initiated by the Holocaust Educational Trust, a British charity founded in 1988. The campaign cited the examples of British citizens such as Frank Foley, Jane Haining and June Ravenhall who had previously been honoured by Israel as some of the British nominees to the status of Righteous Among the Nations, but had received no British honour during their lifetime.

Under the official British honours system honours cannot be awarded posthumously, so the Trust's campaign sought to have the honours system changed, to allow the awarding of either an MBE or an OBE posthumously to British rescuers such as Frank Foley. On 7 May 2008, the 50th anniversary of the death of Foley, the Trust filed an internet petition titled 'UK-Rescuers' on the 10 Downing Street website, to call on the Prime Minister to reconsider the laws governing the posthumous honours system. With a deadline for signatories of 7 May 2009, the petition ultimately gathered 1,087 signatories. It had stated:

...[Foley] was never formally honoured by the British nation during his lifetime for his actions. We therefore call on the Government to review the current statutes governing the honours system, so that the Honours Committee can consider awarding a posthumous knighthood to Frank Foley. We hope that this will open the way for the Honours Committee to consider recognition for other British heroes of the Holocaust, including Randolph Churchill, Sergeant Charles Coward, Jane Haining, Tommy Noble and Robert Smallbones, who risked and in some cases gave their own lives to save others...

Through 2008 and 2009 the campaign attracted support from the media as well as members of both the UK Parliament and the Scottish Parliament, citing the particular examples of Foley, Ravenhall and Haining. In March 2009, the MP Russell Brown tabled the early day motion Recognition for British Heroes of the Holocaust in Westminster citing the examples of Foley, Haining and Ravenhall, securing 135 signatories.

== Announcement of a new award ==
On 29 April 2009, as the early day motion reached Parliament, the government announced that a new award would be specially created to recognise these British rescuers. Announced just after Gordon Brown's first visit to the former German Auschwitz-Birkenau concentration camp in modern-day Poland, the Prime Minister said "We will create national awards in Britain for those British citizens who helped so many people, Jewish and other citizens, during the Holocaust period".

The recognition was to take the form of some type of a new national award, outside of the Honours System, after the government ruled out reforming the posthumous honours rules, with the Secretary of State for Communities and Local Government and the Minister for the Cabinet Office going on to discuss the exact form it would take with the Trust, Russell Brown MP and the families of potential recipients.

== British Hero of the Holocaust award ==
The new award was announced as the British Hero of the Holocaust award, a state recognition similar to a state honour. It was presented to 27 people on 9 March 2010 – in addition to being awarded posthumously to the families of 25 recipients, the medal was also awarded to two living people, Sir Nicholas Winton, aged 100, and Denis Avey, aged 91. Both Winton and Avey, along with relatives of posthumous recipients, received the award at a reception in 10 Downing Street. The award itself is a solid silver medallion, and bears the inscription "in the service of humanity" on the front, and on the reverse, a recognition of the recipient's "selfless actions [which] preserved life in the face of persecution".

To qualify for a British Hero of the Holocaust award the individual had to be a British citizen who helped or rescued Jews or others in the Holocaust; either through extraordinary acts of courage – this essentially captured those people who put their own lives at risk and are Righteous Among the Nations – or by going above and beyond the call of duty in the most difficult circumstances – this included individuals who were not Righteous Among the Nations.

== List of recipients ==
The original 27 recipients were:

- Princess Alice of Greece
- Sir Nicholas Winton
- Major Frank Foley
- Battery Sergeant Major Charles Coward
- Sister Agnes Walsh
- Denis Avey
- Albert Bedane, born in France and raised in Jersey
- Jane Haining
- June Ravenhall
- Sofka Skipwith Russian national who died in the UK
- Bertha Bracey
- Henk Huffener, Dutch born who died in the UK
- Two sisters from London
  - Ida Cook (who wrote under the pen name Mary Burchell)
  - Louise Cook
- Three siblings from Jersey
  - Louisa Gould
  - Ivy Forster
  - Harold Le Druillenec
- A group of ten British prisoners of war who risked execution to save the life of Hannah Sara Rigler.
  - Alan Edwards
  - Roger Letchford
  - George Hammond
  - Thomas "Tommy" Noble
  - Harold 'Bill' Scruton
  - Stanley Wells
  - Bert Hambling
  - Bill Keeble
  - Willy Fisher
  - John Buckley

The recipients in 2013 and 2015 were:

- Solomon Schonfeld, a rabbi who saved hundreds of Jews from extermination camps by acquiring visas which allowed them to escape the Nazis.
- Lena Lakomy who risked her life in Auschwitz to save the life of Hela Frank.
- Robert Smallbones Consul General in Frankfurt who went far beyond the call of duty to ensure that Jewish families were given visas to save their lives, gave refuge to hundreds in his home and visited Concentration Camps to demand the release of interned Jews.
- Arthur Dowden vice-Consul General in Frankfurt who went far beyond the call of duty to save lives by issuing visas and by going through the streets distributing food in the days when Jews were not allowed to receive it.

In January 2018, eight awards were presented.

- John Carvell
- Sir Thomas Preston
- Margaret Reid
- Sir George Ogilvie-Forbes
- Dorothea Weber
- Doreen Warriner
- Trevor Chadwick
- Otto Schiff

Two further awards were made in May and June 2019:

- Rose Henriques
- Joan Stiebel
