= 2006 in art =

The year 2006 in art involved various significant events.

== Events ==
- Rembrandt 400 – Series of activities to commemorate the 400th anniversary of the birth of Rembrandt.
- 1 January – Resale Rights Directive in the European Union, providing a Droit de suite for artists, is implemented (in the United Kingdom by the Artist's Resale Right Regulations (February 13)).
- 1 July – Mudam museum of modern art in Luxembourg (city), designed by I. M. Pei, is opened by Grand Duke Jean.
- 31 August – Stolen Edvard Munch paintings The Scream and Madonna are recovered in a police raid in Oslo, Norway.
- 17 November – The Metropolitan Borough of Bury in the north of England sells its L. S. Lowry painting A River Bank (1947; bought in 1951 for £150) for £1.25 million at a Christie's auction to a private buyer to help fund a £10 million budget deficit.

== Awards ==
- Archibald Prize – Marcus Wills, The Paul Juraszek Monolith
- Artes Mundi Prize – Eija-Liisa Ahtila
- Beck's Futures – Matt Stokes, Long After Tonight
- Hugo Boss Prize – Tacita Dean
- Caldecott Medal – Chris Raschka, The Hello, Goodbye Window
- John Moores Painting Prize – Martin Greenland for "Before Vermeer's Clouds"
- Turner Prize – Tomma Abts
- Wynne prize – John Beard, The Gap

== Films ==
- Art School Confidential
- Factory Girl
- Goya's Ghosts
- Klimt

== Exhibitions ==
- The Masterpieces Rijksmuseum, Amsterdam, 2 Jan – 31 December 2006
- All the Rembrandts, Rijksmuseum, Amsterdam 26 Jan – 31 December 2006
- Frank Stella 1958, 4 February - 7 May at the Arthur M. Sackler Museum at Harvard University in Cambridge, Massachusetts then traveled to the Wexner Center at Ohio State University in Columbus, Ohio from September 1 – December 31.
- Rembrandt – Caravaggio Van Gogh Museum in cooperation with the Rijksmuseum, 24 Feb – 18 June 2006
- A summer with Rembrandt Mauritshuis, The Hague, 26 Jun – 18 September 2006
- Rembrandt, the Etcher The Rembrandt House Museum, Amsterdam, 8 Jul – 3 September 2006
- Rodin (Royal Academy of Arts, London, 23 September 2006 – 1 Jan 2007)
- Everyone Sang: a view of Siegfried Sassoon and his world by 25 contemporary painters (Francis Kyle Gallery, London, November–December)
- Peter Prendergast retrospective, Oriel Ynys Môn, 14 Jan – 26 February 2006 (toured throughout UK)
- "Barely Legal" (Banksy)

== Works ==
- Magdalena Abakanowicz – Agora, Grant Park, Chicago, Illinois, United States
- Gary Breeze – Bali Bombings Memorial, London
- Ed Carpenter – Tecotosh (sculpture, Portland, Oregon)
- Brian Goldbloom – Festival Lanterns (sculpture, Portland, Oregon)
- Dan Graham – For Gordon Bunshaft (sculpture, Washington, D.C.)
- David Hockney
  - Woldgate Woods, March 30 - April 21 2006
  - Woldgate Woods, 6 & 9 November 2006
- Anish Kapoor – Cloud Gate aka "The Bean" (construction begun 2004 work finished 2006) at AT&T Plaza in Millennium Park in Chicago, Illinois
- Mel Katz – Daddy Long Legs (sculpture, Portland, Oregon)
- Gopal Swami Khetanchi
  - Bani-Thani
  - Devashree
- Frank Meisler – Kindertransport – The Arrival (sculpture, London, England)
- Jack Whitten – 9.11.01 (completed)'
- Asylum NYC
- Wiesław Winkler – Aleksander Kamiński Memorial (sculpture, Warsaw, Poland)
- Lovejoy Columns (sculpture, Portland, Oregon)
- Statue of James Meredith

== Deaths ==
=== January to March ===
- 1 January – John Latham, Zambian conceptual artist (b.1921)
- 8 January – Mimmo Rotella, Italian artist and poet (b.1918)
- 14 January – Jim Gary, American sculptor (b.1939)
- 29 January – Nam June Paik, South Korean-born American video artist (b.1932)
- 15 February – Joash Woodrow, English artist (b.1927)
- 23 February – Mauri Favén, Finnish painter (b.1920)
- 4 March
  - David Rose, American animator (b.1910)
  - Edgar Valter, Estonian writer and illustrator of children's books (b.1929)
- 7 March - Mary Spencer Watson, English sculptor (b.1913)
- 9 March – Jean Leymarie, French art historian (b.1919)
- 25 March – Bob Carlos Clarke, Irish photographer (b.1950)
- 27 March – Ian Hamilton Finlay, Scottish poet, writer, artist and gardener (b.1925)
- 28 March – Pro Hart, Australian painter (b.1928)

=== April to June ===
- 5 April – Allan Kaprow, American painter, assemblagist and art theorist (b.1927)
- 15 April – Davidee Itulu, Inuk artist (b. 1929)
- 23 April – Isaac Witkin, South African sculptor (b.1936)
- 3 May – Karel Appel, Dutch painter, sculptor and poet (b.1921)
- 8 May – Iain Macmillan, Scottish photographer (b.1938)
- 9 May – Edouard Jaguer, French poet and art critic (b.1924)
- 27 May – Alex Toth, American comic book artist and cartoonist (b.1928)

=== July to December ===
- 8 July – Catherine Leroy, French photographer (b.1944)
- 15 July – Andrée Ruellan, American painter (b.1905)
- 28 July – Richard Mock, American painter, sculptor and cartoonist (b.1944)
- 1 August
  - Jason Rhoades, American installation artist (b.1965)
  - Bob Thaves, American illustrator (b.1924)
- 4 August – Julio Galán, Mexican artist (b.1958)
- 17 August – Werner G. Scharff, German-born American arts patron and fashion designer (b. 1916)
- 20 August – Joe Rosenthal, American Pulitzer Prize-winning photographer (b.1911)
- 26 August – Vladimir Tretchikoff, Russian artist (b.1913)
- 1 September – Sir Kyffin Williams, Welsh landscape painter (b.1918)
- 17 October – Marcia Tucker, American museum curator (b.1940)
- 25;October -- Emilio Vedova, Italian painter (b. 1919)
- 26 November – Dave Cockrum, American comic book artist (b.1943)
- 6 December – Robert Rosenblum, American art historian (b.1927)
- 16 December – Larry Zox, American painter and printmaker (b.1937)
- 18 December – Ruth Bernhard, American photographer (b.1905)
