= For Gordon Bunshaft =

2006 sculpture by Dan Graham

- Artist: Dan Graham
- Year: 2006
- Location: Hirshhorn Museum and Sculpture Garden, Washington, D.C.
- 38°53′20″N 77°01′22″W

For Gordon Bunshaft is a 2006 sculpture by Dan Graham, installed at the Hirshhorn Museum and Sculpture Garden in Washington, D.C., United States. The work, which refers to American architect Gordon Bunshaft, was installed by the reflection pool of the Bunshaft-designed sculpture garden at the Hirshhorn on May 30, 2008.

== See also ==
- 2006 in art
- List of public art in Washington, D.C., Ward 2
