= Gopal Swami Khetanchi =

Indian painter based in Jaipur (born 1958)

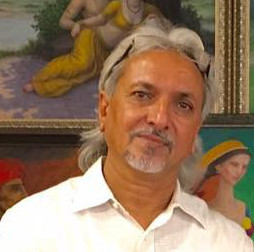
- Born: 15 February 1958 (age 68); Sardarshahar, Rajasthan, India
- Website: www.khetanchi.com

Gopal Swami Khetanchi (born 15 February 1958) is an Indian painter based in Jaipur. Hailing from an artistic family in north Rajasthan, Khetanchi studied fine art in Jaipur and worked for some time as an assistant art director in Bollywood and an illustrator for magazines, before returning to Rajasthan to focus on painting.

Khetanchi is known for painting petite female figures, Rajput women, Rajasthani village women and forts, as well as adapting classical European paintings to Indian versions. Another form associated with him is calendar kitsch. Distinguishing features of his style are uniqueness, delicacy and swiftness of drawing. Though he is recognized as a realist painter and self-identifies as such, his works span from Romanticism to deep Realism and are held in various private and corporate collections in India and abroad. His paintings have been displayed at solo and group exhibitions at Jaipur, New Delhi, Mumbai, Singapore, Dubai and London.

== Life ==
Khetanchi was born in north Rajasthan on 2 February 1958. He hails from Sardarshahar town in Churu district. His father Khetaram was a painter who worked as an art teacher in a government school in Sardarshahar. Khetanchi grew up in Rajasthan in an environment conducive to art and ventured into painting at the age of 15, starting with portraits and then moving to paintings. He was inspired by the paintings of Leonardo da Vinci, Michelangelo, Rembrandt and Ingres.

Khetanchi received a Bachelor of Arts degree in Drawing and Painting from University of Rajasthan in Jaipur. He developed his painting skills in Mumbai, working on film sets and sketching passers-by at the Juhu beach. While in Mumbai, he worked as an assistant art director with Manzoor ul Haq on several Bollywood films like Muqaddar Ka Sikandar (1978), Abdullah (1980), Jwalamukhi (1980) and Kaalia (1981). Khetanchi says he did not like the environment of Bollywood and decided to channelise his creativity into painting only. He returned to Rajasthan and started with painting forts and culture of the state. Over the years, he captured the culture, traditions, rural beauty, crafts and textiles of Rajasthan. As per Khetanchi, he received limelight and recognition starting from 2003, when his work was exhibited in both New Delhi and Jaipur.

Khetanchi lives in Jaipur, where he works from his studio.

== Work ==
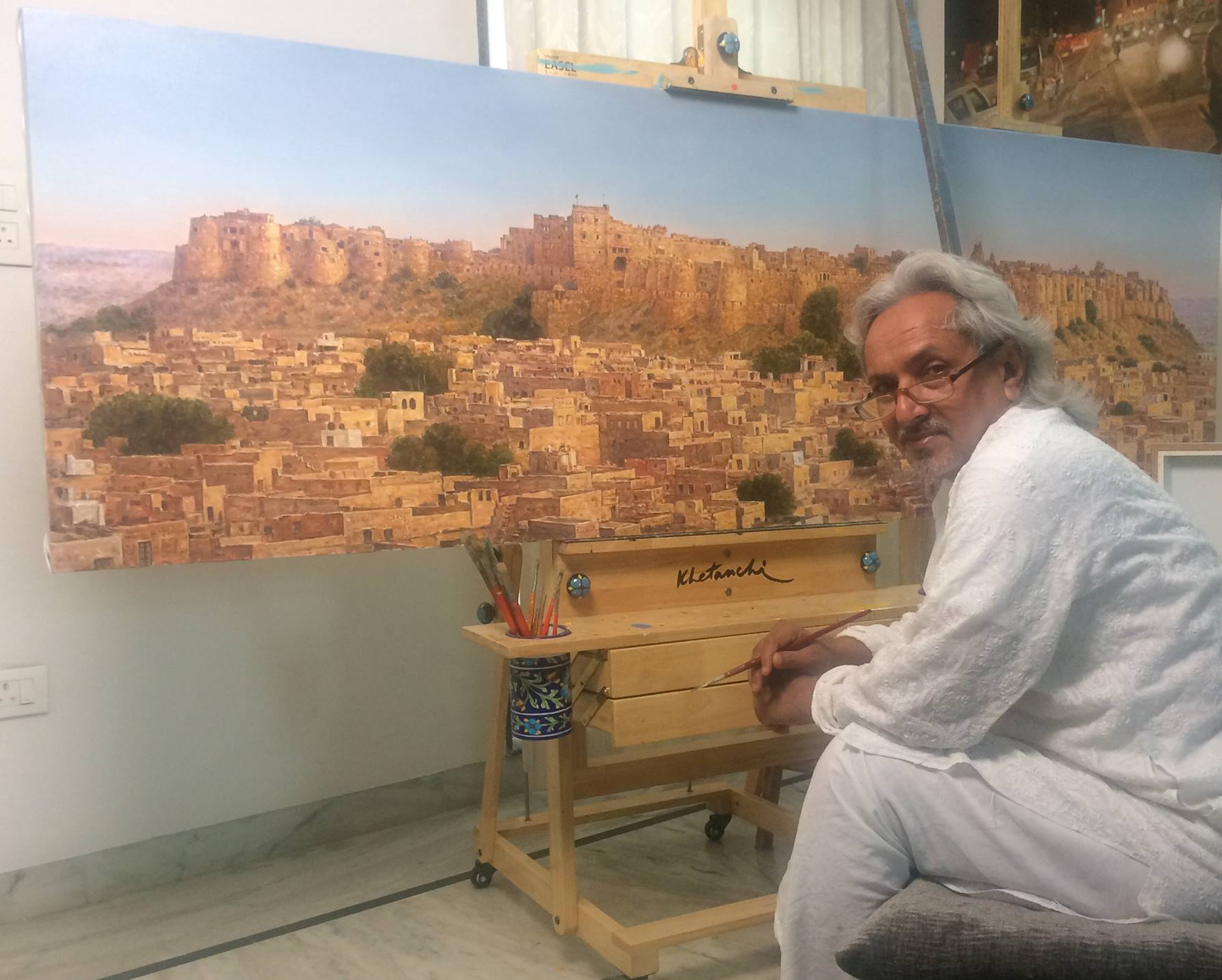
Gopal Swami Khetanchi with a painting of the Jaisalmer Fort

Khetanchi works with oil on canvas, and has been doing so since 1971. He has not experimented with acrylics as he feels that he has better control on colour values with oil colours. He usually takes a month's time to complete a work and works in four layers.

Khetanchi's work saw several phases and styles like Realism, Surrealism and Abstraction, before ending in a combination of traditional and modern art. In 2006, the style in his exhibition Shringar combined fine linework of Rajasthani miniature paintings with the prettiness of Victorian kitsch. By 2011, he had moved from pure figuration to conceptual renderings and started experimenting with different palettes and imaging styles.

Erik Maell writes of Khentanchi:

His appreciation of India's rich and colorful history remains evident throughout his paintings, particularly his admiration of brave warriors and his fondness for the unparalleled beauty of Rajput women, as referenced in his Mona Lisa reinterpretations.

As per critic P B Chandra, Khetanchi is perhaps the only artist after Ram Gopal Vijayvargiya to specialize in painting women in various moods and beauty. Chandra believes that Khetanchi's depiction of women is inspired by the style of Raja Ravi Varma, although Khetanchi says that he has not tried to imitate any past painters or copy any contemporaries and that his style of work is different. Chandra wrote in 2003 that Khetanchi's works were regional in emphasis with a heavy dose of romanticism.

Khetanchi is known for giving a unique Indian or Rajasthani touch to his works, especially to the robes and background. His recreation of Sandro Botticelli's Birth of Venus has a pearl-clad Rajasthani woman coming out of a lotus in place of a shell. When Indianising European paintings, Khetanchi adapts the figures to Indian concepts of beauty and does not paint figures completely nude to avoid any controversies. As per art critic Prayag Shukla, Khetanchi's recreations of sorts of European paintings have both a Western and an Eastern context.

=== Reinterpretations of Mona Lisa ===
Khetanchi has reinterpreted the Mona Lisa in two oil-on-canvasses painted in 2006: Devashree (24 by 36 inches) and Bani-Thani (20 by 30 inches), of which the latter is a combination of the Mona Lisa and the eponymous painting Bani Thani by Nihal Chand. Bani-Thani was used in the promotion for Le Festival des Écrivains du monde: Écrivains de l’Inde held in Paris in 2014 and on the cover of the November–December 2014 edition of Nouvelles De L'Inde, the bimonthly publication of the Indian embassy in Paris.

=== Gandhigiri ===
Through his Gandhigiri canvasses (2010), Khetanchi depicted Mahatma Gandhi's dream of an independent India free from poverty and hardships by juxtaposing Gandhi's face with that of common people. Art curator Archana Bahl Sapra said that the exhibition showed the "contrasting picture of shining India and whining Bharat". Some paintings showed Gandhi almost lost, as he sees an India which is modern, fast-moving, tech-savvy, busy and Bollywood-obsessed with consumerism at its peak, while others showed him seeing people struggling in poverty due to corruption and government policies.

=== Monuments ===
Monuments is one of the favourite themes of Khetanchi. He has painted the Jal Mahal and Hawa Mahal in his own distinct style. In addition, he has painted many forts including three forts of Jaipur (Nahargarh Fort, Jaigarh Fort and Amber Fort), Jaisalmer's Sonar Killa, Chittorgarh's Vijay Stambha, Udaipur's City Palace, Jodhpur's Mehrangarh Fort, Bundi's Taragarh Fort, Bikaner's Junagarh Fort, Kuchaman Fort and Kumbhalgarh Fort. His exhibition titled Rajputana (2012) displayed eleven paintings of various forts in Rajasthan.

== Views ==
Khetanchi, known for his love for Rajasthan, says of the state:

To me, Rajasthani beauty has an essence that appeals like nothing else. The way the women dress borders on covering their body and showing it off. There’s a mystery, an essence. For a simple example, a ghoonghat covering half her face is any day more enticing than the face itself. Her beautiful clothes sensuously running over her bare feet at times will arouse stronger emotions than complete nudity.

From 2008 to 2010, Khetanchi researched the message and teachings of Mahatma Gandhi and their contemporary relevance. Khetanchi sees Mahatma Gandhi as a motivational force in his life. He is passionate about Gandhi's vision and says:

An independent India, free not only from the Imperial rule or domination but also from poverty and hardships for the people, has remained a dream for Gandhiji! The present day atmosphere of consumerism still needs to be rectified. Like Gandhi we need to counter pose ancient Indian civilisation and emphasise on self governing village communities.

Khetanchi believes that while art may not offer solutions to social problems, it helps bring them into focus. He feels that foreign tourists looking for Rajasthani art should be given correct direction with in-house guidance, and they should not be cheated by being sold cheap art at huge prices. He sees himself as a realist, or a sincere friend of actual truth, and says he chose realistic art because it is nearer to human interest and at the same time it is very much challenging.

Khetanchi believes that many heritage places in Rajasthan have been neglected and even guides, who do not know the true significance of the sites, are ignorant about local art forms like the Bundi school of art.

== Exhibitions ==
Khetanchi does few exhibitions, about one a year. The reason, as per Khetanchi, is that his exhibitions are theme-based.

=== Solo exhibitions ===
- 1998: Hotel Park Royal, New Delhi.
- 1998: Jawahar Kala Kendra, Jaipur.
- 2002: Jawahar Kala Kendra, Jaipur.
- 2003: Rabindra Bhawan, Lalit Kala Akademi, New Delhi.
- 2003: Mahakaal at Surekh Gallery, Jawahar Kala Kendra, Jaipur. The paintings in surrealist mode and subtle palette depicted drought and famine in Rajasthan.
- 2004: Jawahar Kala Kendra, Jaipur.
- 2005: Rajputana Sheraton, Jaipur.
- 2005: Nehru Centre, Mumbai.
- 2006: Shringar at Jawahar Kala Kendra, Jaipur. This series of paintings depicted princesses, courtesans and attendants engaged in toilette rituals and beautification.
- 2006: Museum Gallery, Mumbai.
- 2007: Nehru Centre, Mumbai. Indianised versions of famous European paintings, including Mona Lisa, Birth of Venus and Great Odalisque.
- 2008: Jawahar Kala Kendra, Jaipur.
- 2008: A Tribute to The Masters at Bharatiya Vidya Bhawan, London. The collection was a recreation of works of European painters with Khetanchi's style and imagination.
- 2008: A Tribute to The Masters at La Galleria, Pall Mall, London.
- 2010: Dharohar at Surekh Gallery, Jawahar Kala Kendra, Jaipur. The exhibition had 29 paintings celebrating Jaipur's architecture and covered major landmarks of Jaipur including Nahargarh Fort, Jaigarh Fort, Jantar Mantar, Amber Fort and Hawa Mahal. The exhibition was inaugurated by Arjun Prajapati and also featured a self-portrait.
- 2010: Gandhi-giri at Art Positive, Delhi. The exhibition displayed twenty-one artworks: one installation (Gandhi-giri fiberglass sculpture) and twenty paintings (including fifteen large oil-on-canvasses up to 15x6 feet in size). The paintings included Gender Bender, In Search of Truth, Three Monkeys, Empower the women to empower the nation and Communal harmony, please. All paintings depicted an elderly Gandhi with other elements and figures complementing or countering the discourse. Gender Bender depicted womanhood and women as part of Gandhi's preoccupations, while In Search of Truth and Gandhi-giri showcased the archetypal image of Gandhi as a wise leader.
- 2011: Gallery Parijat II, Jawahar Kala Kendra, Jaipur.
- 2012: Rajputana at Jawahar Kala Kendra, Jaipur. This exhibition displayed eleven paintings of forts in Rajasthan.

=== Group exhibitions ===
- 1999: Art Today, New Delhi.
- 2000: Art Today, New Delhi.
- 2003: Dhoomimal Art Gallery, New Delhi.
- 2007: Art Fair, Singapore.
- 2008: Arts cape, Epicentre, Gurgaon.
- 2009: Art Mat, Epicentre, Gurgaon.
- 2011: Blessing (40 by 60 inches, oil on canvas) at Art Positive, New Delhi.
- 2015: Gandhigiri: Power of the loom and the handmade at Lalit Kala Akademi, New Delhi.
