= Tecotosh =

Sculpture in Portland, Oregon

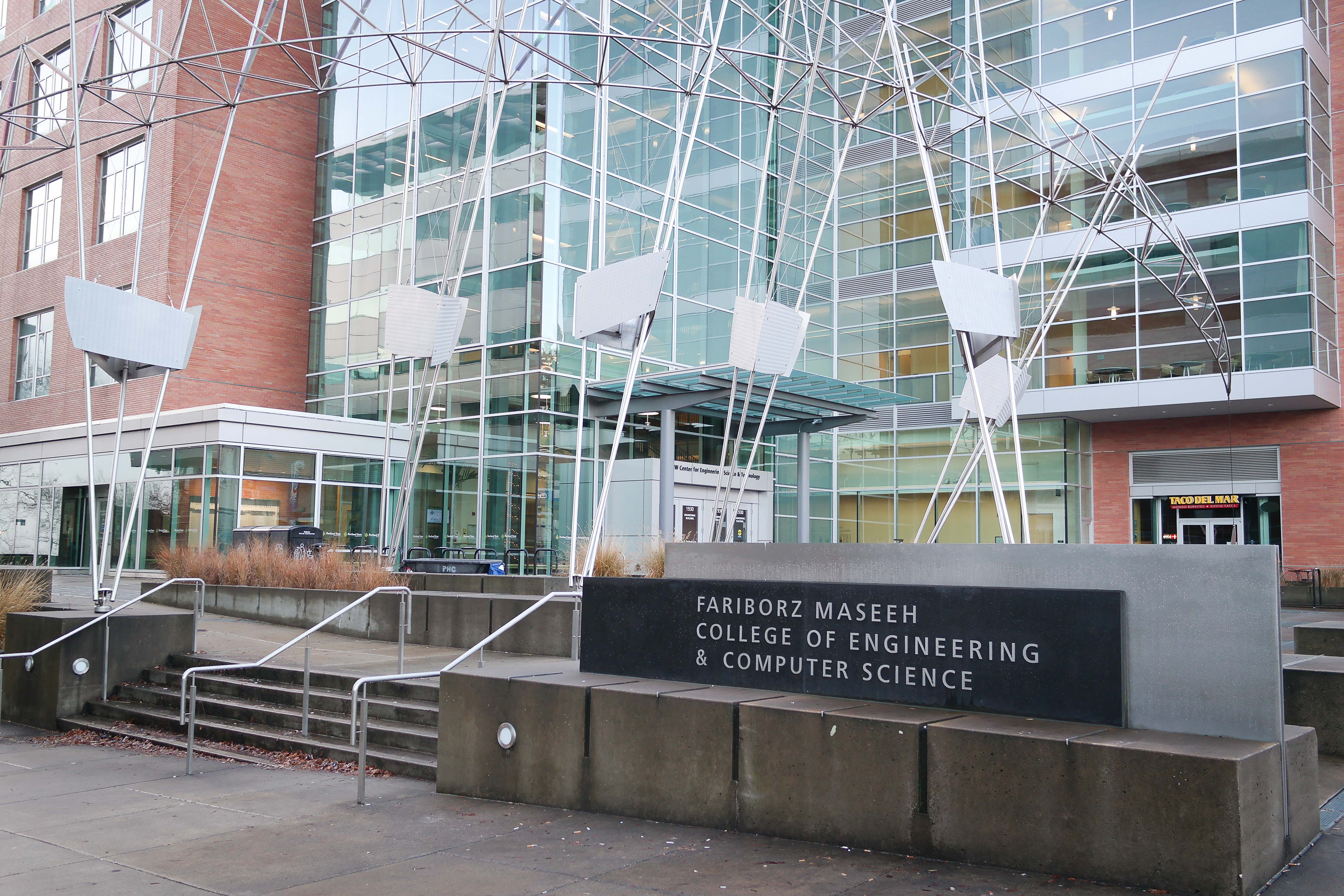
- The sculpture outside the Maseeh College of Engineering and Computer Science in 2014
- Type: Sculpture
- Medium: Stainless steel; cables; hardware; laminated dichroic glass; lights
- Location: Portland, Oregon, United States; 45.50933°N 122.68123°W
- Owner: Northwest Center for Engineering, Science and Technology

Tecotosh is an outdoor 2005–2006 stainless steel and glass sculpture by Ed Carpenter, installed at the Portland State University campus in Portland, Oregon, United States.

== Description ==
Tecotosh, designed by Ed Carpenter, is located outside the Maseeh College of Engineering and Computer Science at the intersection of Southwest 4th and College on the Portland State University campus. The abstract sculpture is made of a stainless steel truss, cables, hardware, laminated dichroic glass, and lights. The Smithsonian Institution lists the Northwest Center for Engineering, Science and Technology as the work's owner.

== See also ==
- 2006 in art
