= Daddy Long Legs (sculpture) =

Sculpture in Portland, Oregon, U.S.

- The sculpture in 2015
- Artist: Mel Katz
- Year: 2006
- Type: Sculpture
- Medium: Painted aluminum
- Location: Portland, Oregon, United States; 45.52096°N 122.67770°W

Daddy Long Legs is an outdoor 2006 painted aluminum sculpture by Mel Katz, located in Portland, Oregon, United States. It is maintained by the Regional Arts & Culture Council.

== Description and history ==
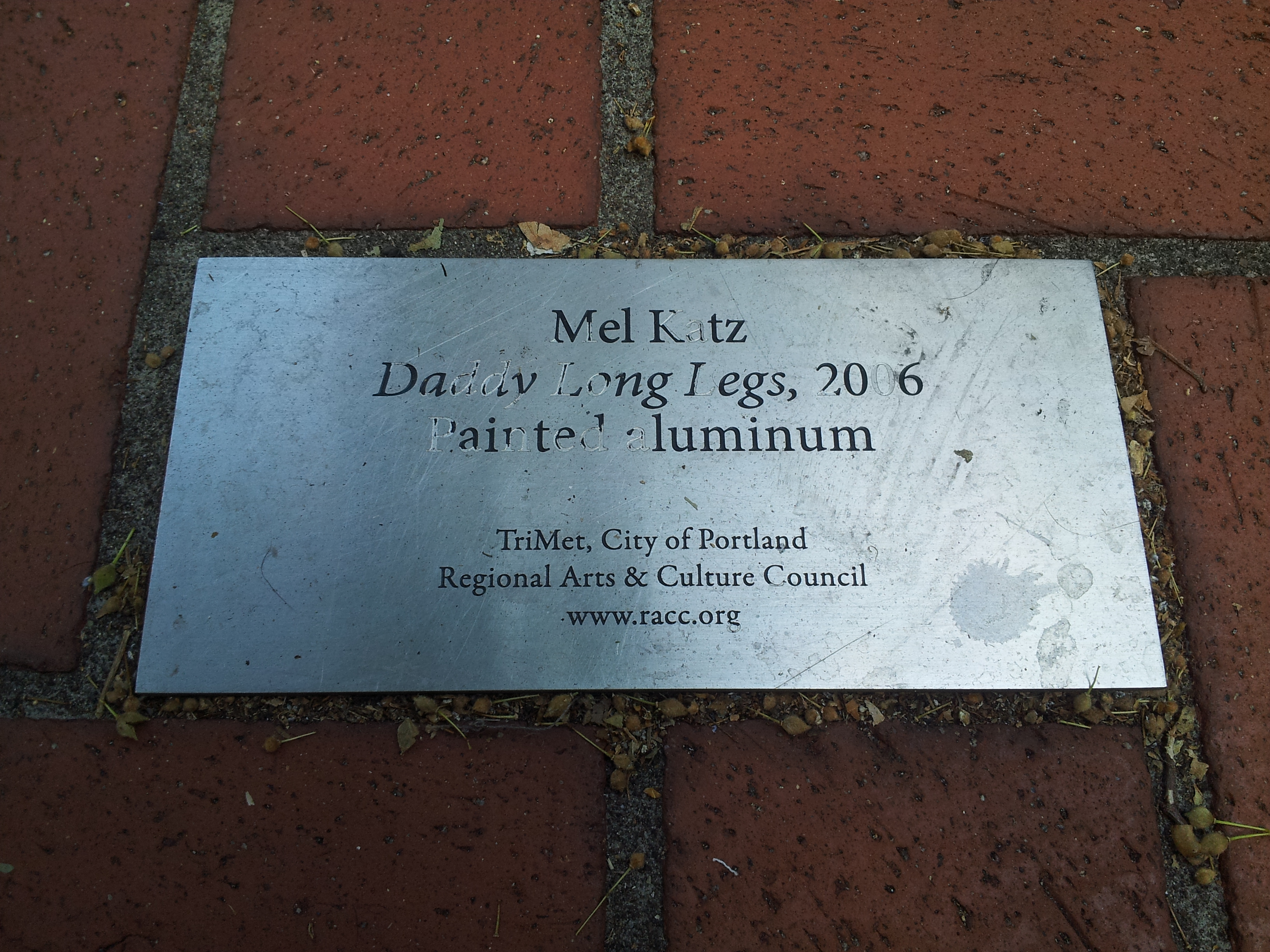
Plaque for the sculpture

Daddy Long Legs (2006) was designed by Mel Katz and installed along the Portland Transit Mall at the intersection of Southwest 6th Avenue and Stark in downtown Portland. Laser cutting was completed by BBC Steel in Canby, masking was executed by Aztec Sign and Graphics, and painting was done by Dura Industries, both based in Portland, respectively. The aluminum sculpture is flat but appears dimensional due to its painted interior shapes. The artist named the work Daddy Long Legs because of its "elongated black shapes and welded base plates", which are reminiscent of pant legs.

== Reception ==
The sculpture has been called "colorful and modern" and has been included in at least one published walking tour of Portland.

== See also ==
- 2006 in art
