= Yantarny, Kaliningrad Oblast =

Yantarny Янтарный
- Urban-type settlement
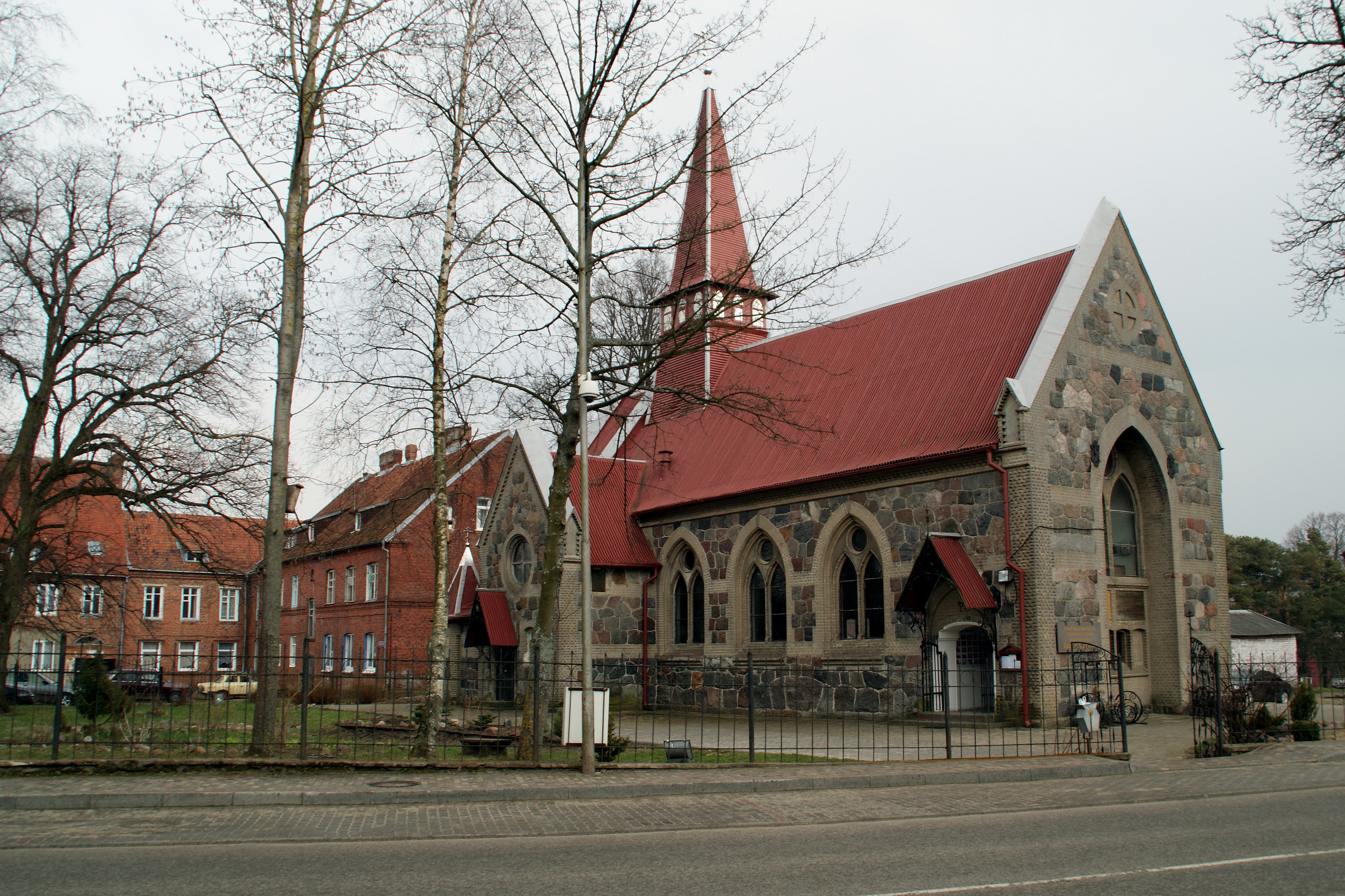
- Church in Yantarny

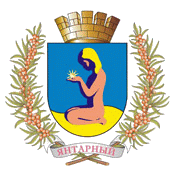
- Coat of arms
- Interactive map of Yantarny
- Location of Yantarny Yantarny (Kaliningrad Oblast)
- Coordinates: 54°52′N 19°57′E
- Country: Russia
- Federal subject: Kaliningrad Oblast
- Founded: 1234
- Elevation: 30 m (98 ft)

Population (2010 Census)
  - Total: 5,524
  - Estimate (2025): 6,513 (+17.9%)

Administrative status
  - Subordinated to: urban-type settlement of oblast significance of Yantarny
  - Capital of: urban-type settlement of oblast significance of Yantarny

Municipal status
  - Urban okrug: Yantarny Urban Okrug
  - Capital of: Yantarny Urban Okrug
- Time zone: UTC+2 (MSK–1)
- Postal codes: 238580, 238581
- OKTMO ID: 27740000051
- Website: yantarny.net

Yantarny (Russian: Янта́рный; German: Palmnicken; Polish: Palmniki; Lithuanian: Palvininkai) is an urban locality (an urban-type settlement) in Kaliningrad Oblast, Russia, located on the Sambian Peninsula, about 40 kilometers (25 mi) from Kaliningrad, the administrative center of the oblast. Population: 5,524 (2010 census); 5,455 (2002 census); 4,948 (1989 Soviet census).

== History ==
=== Pre-1945 ===
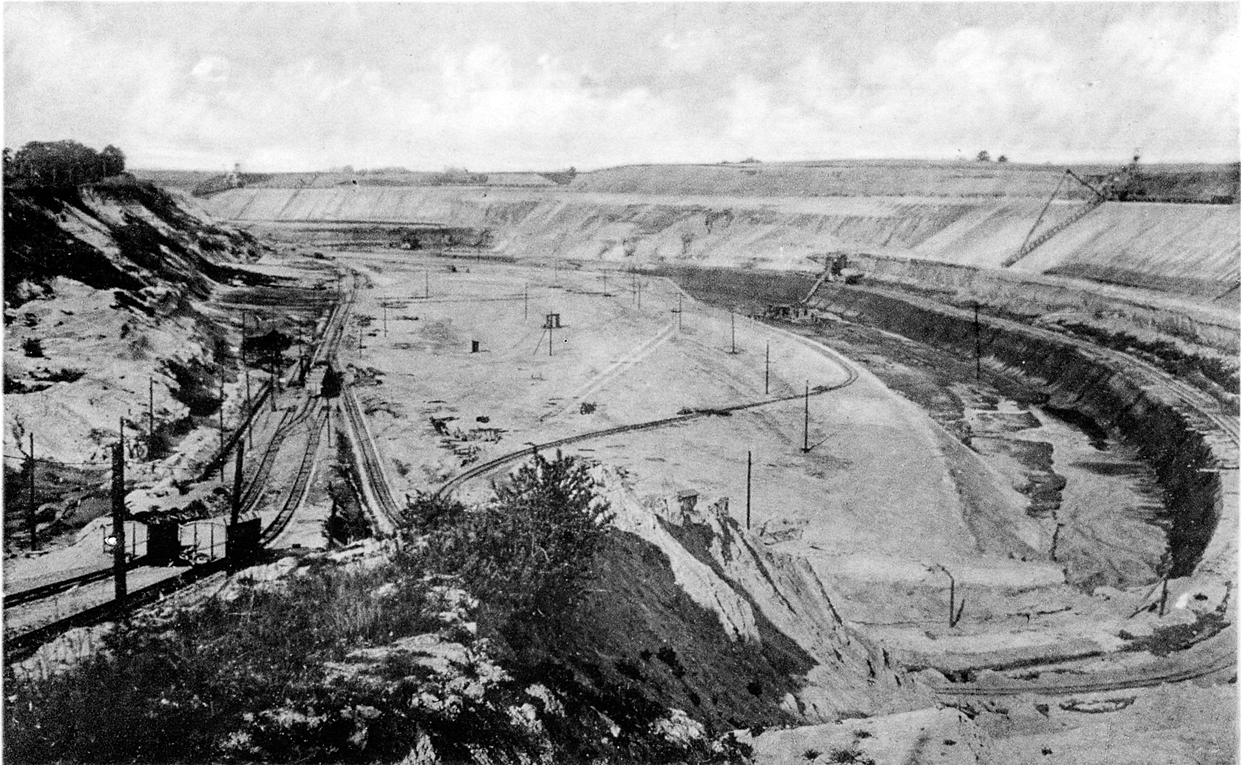
Local amber quarry in the early 20th century

Palmnicken was founded in 1234 by the Teutonic Knights during the Northern Crusades, on the site of a previous Old Prussian settlement. After the secularization of the Teutonic Knights' Prussian lands in 1525, it became part of the Duchy of Prussia, a vassal duchy of the Kingdom of Poland. During the Polish–Swedish wars, Palmnicken was one of several towns in the region occupied by Sweden, who remained in the town for six years.

The town became part of the Kingdom of Prussia in 1701, and was occupied by Imperial Russian troops between 1758 and 1762 during the Seven Years' War. Palmnicken was included in the newly formed province of East Prussia in 1773, and resulting from the further Prussian administrative reform in 1818 it became part of Landkreis Fischhausen district, which was seated in Fischhausen (now Primorsk). The local amber trade along the coast of the Sambian Peninsula entered industrial development in 1827, with Palmnicken eventually becoming the industry's main hub in the region. The town became part of the German Empire in 1871 during the Prussian-led unification of Germany, and at the beginning of the 20th century developed into a spa resort. In 1939, the town had 3,079 inhabitants as part of Nazi Germany at the beginning of World War II.

==== Massacre of Palmnicken ====
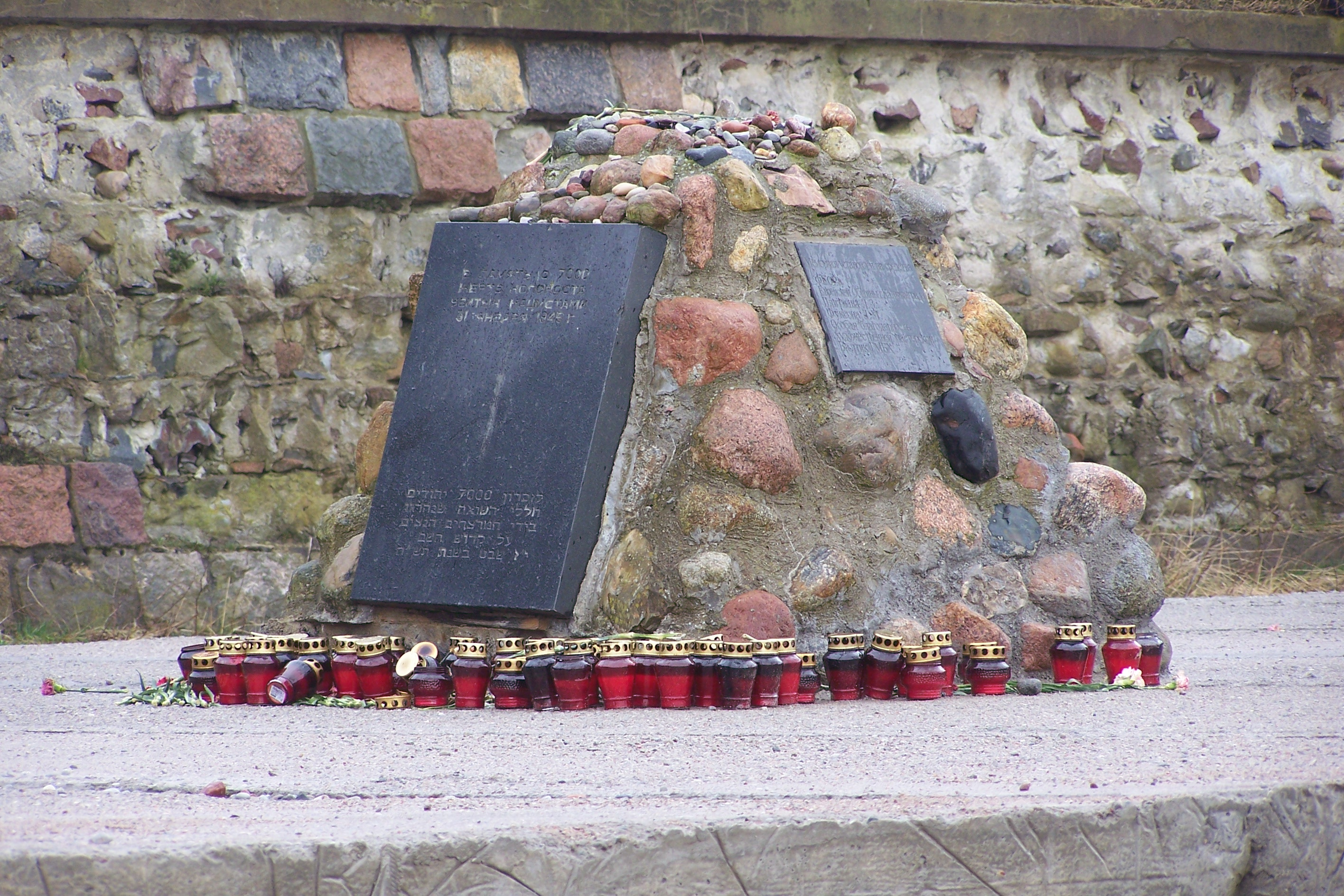
Memorial to the victims of the massacre

Due to the advance of Soviet troops in January 1945, the Stutthof concentration camp, an SS subcamp near Stutthof (now Sztutowo, Poland), was disbanded and its inmates were sent on a forced march through Königsberg to Palmnicken, which only 3,000 of the original 13,000 inmates survived. Originally, the surviving detainees were to be walled up within a tunnel of an amber mine in Palmnicken, but this plan collapsed upon the objections of the mine's estate manager, the well respected Hans Feyerabend, who stated that whilst ever he was alive nobody would be killed, and he then arranged for the prisoners to be given food. The mine's director, Landsmann, then refused to open the mine citing concerns that it was used for the town's water supply. Unfortunately, after receiving threats from the SS, and possibly the ardent Nazi mayor Fredrichs, Feyerabend committed suicide though murder has not been ruled out. The SS guards pushed them out onto the Baltic sea ice, shooting them, and around 33 survived, only to be captured, then, the SS, with the assistance of Mayor Fredrichs summoning a group of armed Hitler Youth (whom had been plied with drink) to shoot the captured survivors on Jan 31, 1945. 17 survived the war. A monument to the victims was unveiled in Yantarny on January 30, 2011. The monument, by Frank Meisler, features hands lifted up to the sky as a symbol of the perishing people. On August 24, 2011, the monument was vandalized with paint and antisemitic slogans.

=== Post-1945 ===
Palmnicken was eventually captured by the Red Army on 7 April 1945, during the closing days of the war. The northern third of the former province of East Prussia, including Palmnicken, became part of the Soviet Union in 1945 under terms of border changes promulgated at the Potsdam Conference. The German population evacuated or was subsequently expelled to West Germany, also in accordance with the Potsdam Agreement. Palmnicken was renamed Yantarny, derived from yantar, the Russian word for amber, and was repopulated by Soviet settlers, predominantly Russians, as well as Belarusians, Ukrainians, and Tatars.

== Administrative and municipal status ==
Within the framework of administrative divisions, it is, together with two rural localities, incorporated as the urban-type settlement of oblast significance of Yantarny—an administrative unit with the status equal to that of the districts. As a municipal division, the urban-type settlement of oblast significance of Yantarny is incorporated as Yantarny Urban Okrug.

== Amber industry ==
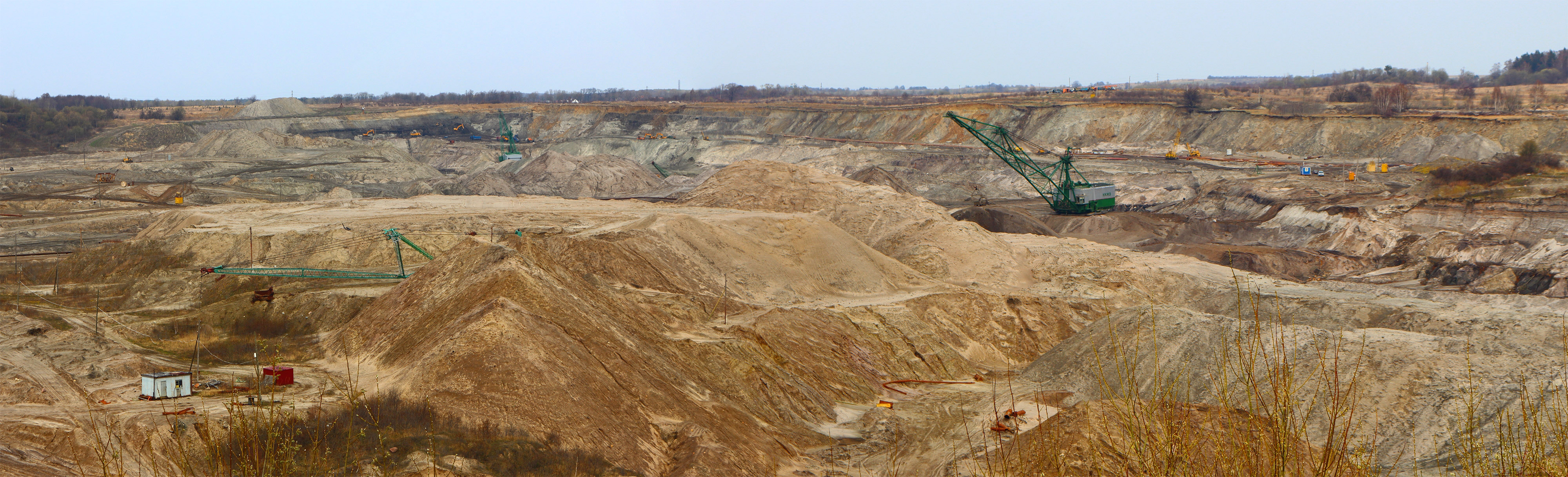
Primorskoye amber mine in Yantarny

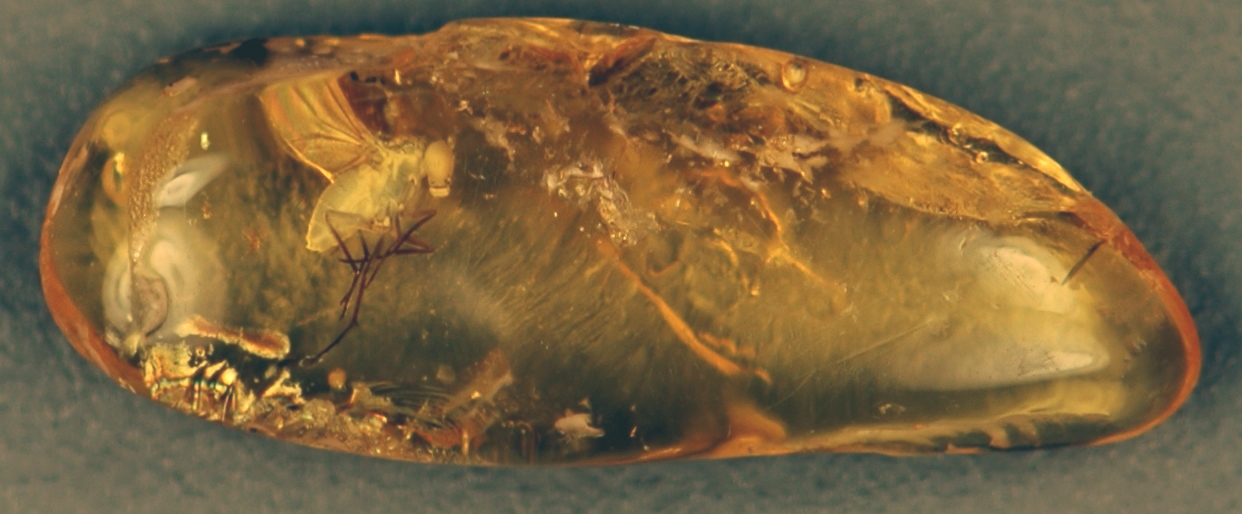
Fly in polished Baltic amber (16 mm across), from a Yantarny mine

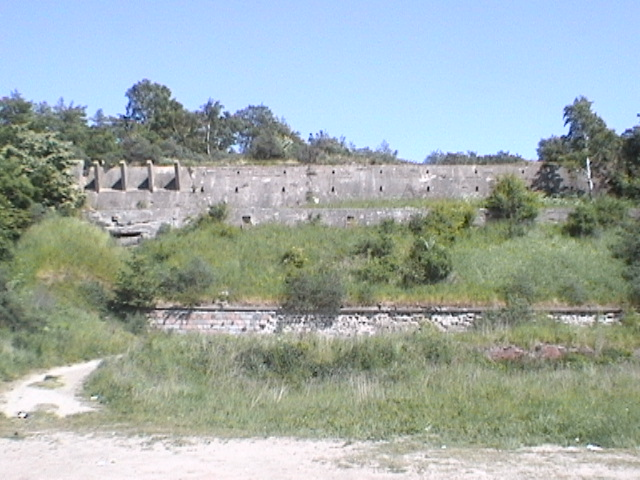
Amber mine pit "Anna" (now closed)

Amber was collected along the shores of the Sambian coast during the age of the Teutonic Knights. They succeeded in establishing a monopoly over the amber trade, which carried over to the Prussian state of the House of Hohenzollern. In the 16th century amber collected along the coastline was brought to Palmnicken where it was sorted and then sent to Königsberg for further processing. After 1811 the amber production was leased. In 1858 the firm Stantien & Becker was founded. Stantien & Becker created the first open pit amber mine in the world, but mined amber mainly with the method of underground mining (pits "Anna" and "Henriette"). Initially the mine produced 50 tons of amber annually, but by 1937 - now a state-owned company (Preußische Bergwerks- und Hütten AG) - it produced 650 tons annually and employed 700 workers. As part of the Soviet Union, Yantarny produced approximately 600 tons of amber annually through the company Russky Yantar ("Russian Amber"). The refinement of amber was discontinued in 2002 by a directive of the Russian Regulatory Authority for Technology and Environmental Protection. Some years later, a new open pit mine ("Primorskoje") was established in immediate vicinity of the old open pit mine. In 2008 about 500 tons amber was mined at this location.

== Amber Beach Festival ==
In 2010, Yantarny hosted the annual Amber Beach international music festival.
