= Kindertransport – The Arrival =

Sculptural group outside Liverpool Street station, London

- The sculpture in 2011
- Artist: Frank Meisler
- Medium: Bronze sculpture
- Location: London, United Kingdom; 51.517586°N 0.082563°W

Kindertransport – The Arrival is an outdoor bronze memorial sculpture by Frank Meisler, located in the forecourt of Liverpool Street station in London, United Kingdom. It commemorates the 10,000 Jewish children who escaped Nazi persecution and arrived at the station during 1938–1939. The memorial was installed in September 2006, replacing Flor Kent's bronze Für Das Kind (For the Child), which was installed in 2003. It was commissioned by World Jewish Relief and the Association of Jewish Refugees (AJR). There is a similar memorial at Harwich, installed in 2022.

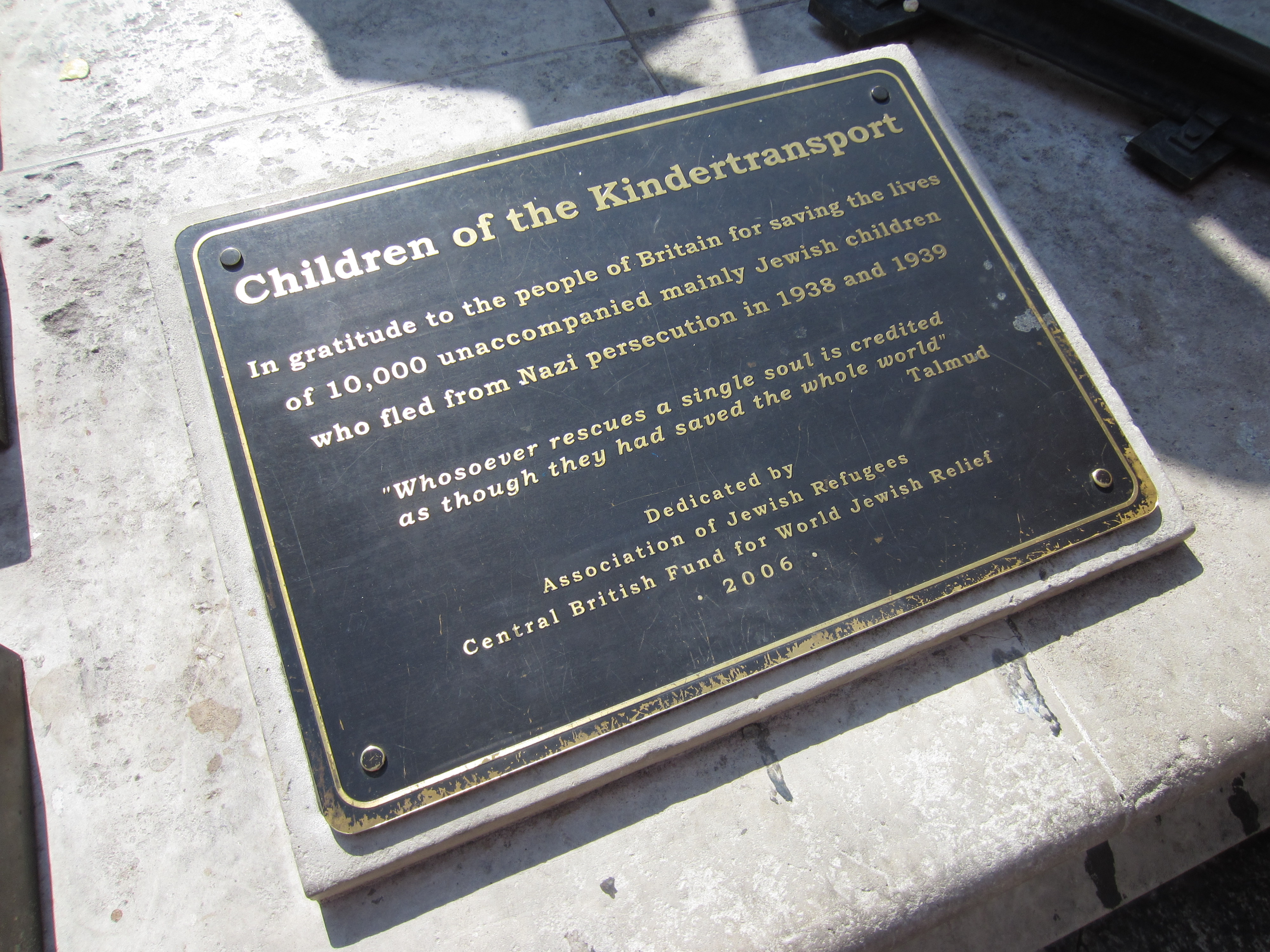
Plaque for the memorial in 2014

== Literature ==
- Marie-Catherine Allard (27 April 2020). Modelling bridges between past and current issues of forced migration: Frank Meisler’s memorial sculpture Kindertransport – The Arrival. In: Jewish historical studies, vol. 51 issue 1, p. 86-104.

== See also ==
- 2006 in art
- List of public art in the City of London
- Trains to Life – Trains to Death, Berlin
- Kindertransport – Channel Crossing to Life
