= Trains to Life – Trains to Death =

Sculpture in Berlin, Germany

- Züge in das Leben – Züge in den Tod (German)
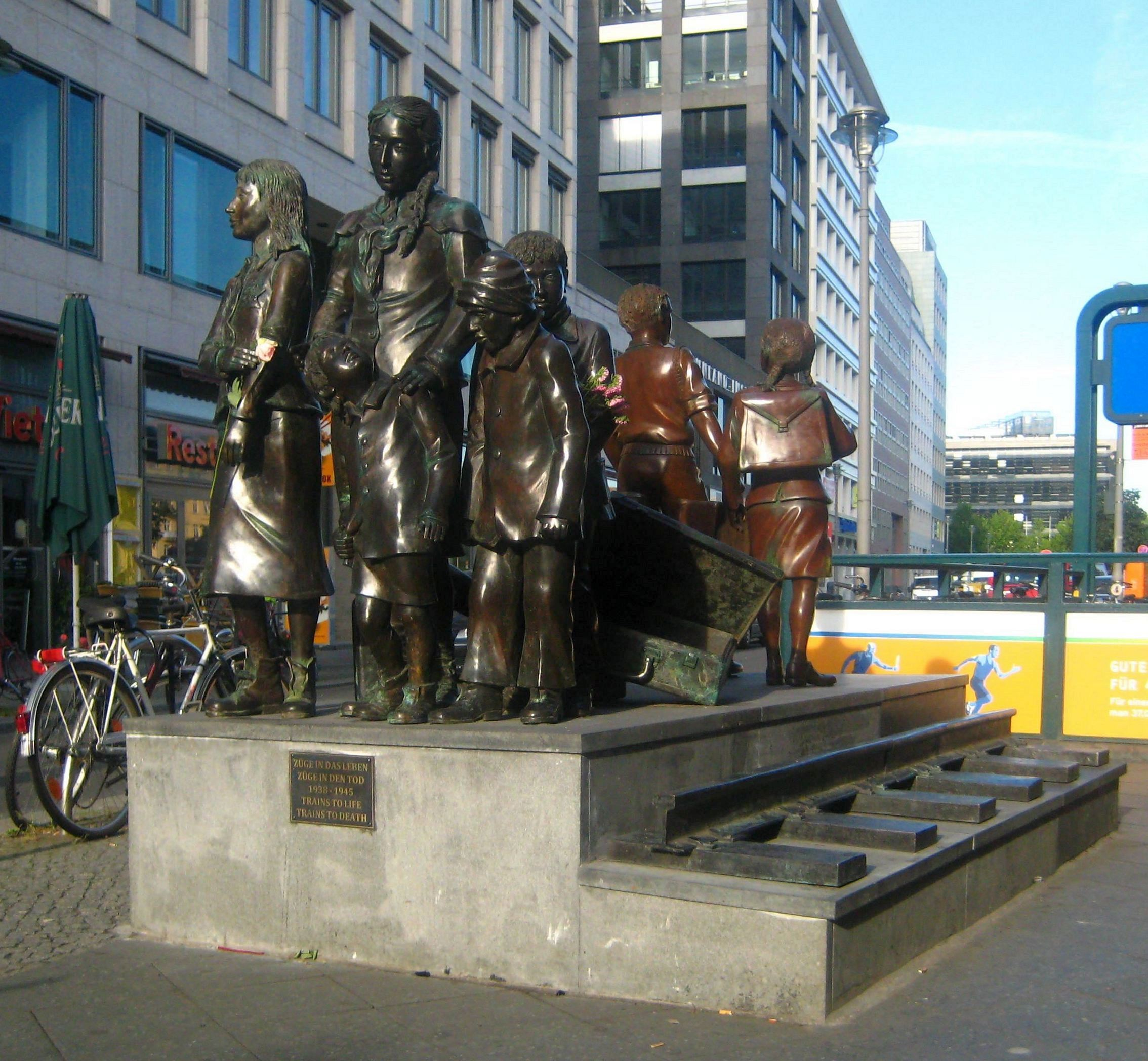
- The sculpture in 2009. In the foreground are the five children, and in the background are the two children (see article text).
- Artist: Frank Meisler
- Type: Sculpture
- Medium: Bronze
- Dimensions: 225 cm (89 in)
- Location: Berlin, Germany; 52°31′11″N 13°23′16″E

Trains to Life – Trains to Death (German: Züge in das Leben – Züge in den Tod) is a 2.25 meter outdoor bronze sculpture by architect and sculptor Frank Meisler, installed outside the Friedrichstraße station at the intersection of Georgenstraße and Friedrichstraße, in Berlin, Germany. It is the second in a series of so far five installations also on display near railway stations in London, Hamburg, Gdańsk and Hook of Holland.

== Description ==
The sculpture depicts two groups of children. One group is a pair of children symbolizing those saved by the Kindertransport, which brought 10,000 Jewish children from soon-to-be Nazi-occupied countries in Eastern Europe to safety in the United Kingdom and other countries. The other group consists of five children, who represent the 1,600,000 Jewish and non-Jewish children brought by Holocaust trains to the concentration camps and later killed there. Meisler himself was among those saved by the Kindertransport.

== History ==
In January 2024 the monument was vandalized, graffiti on the statues of children appearing to show mosques on the body of one child and the suitcase of another.

== See also ==
- Children in the Holocaust
- Holocaust trains
- Kindertransport – The Arrival (2003), London
