= Jack Whitten =

American painter and sculptor

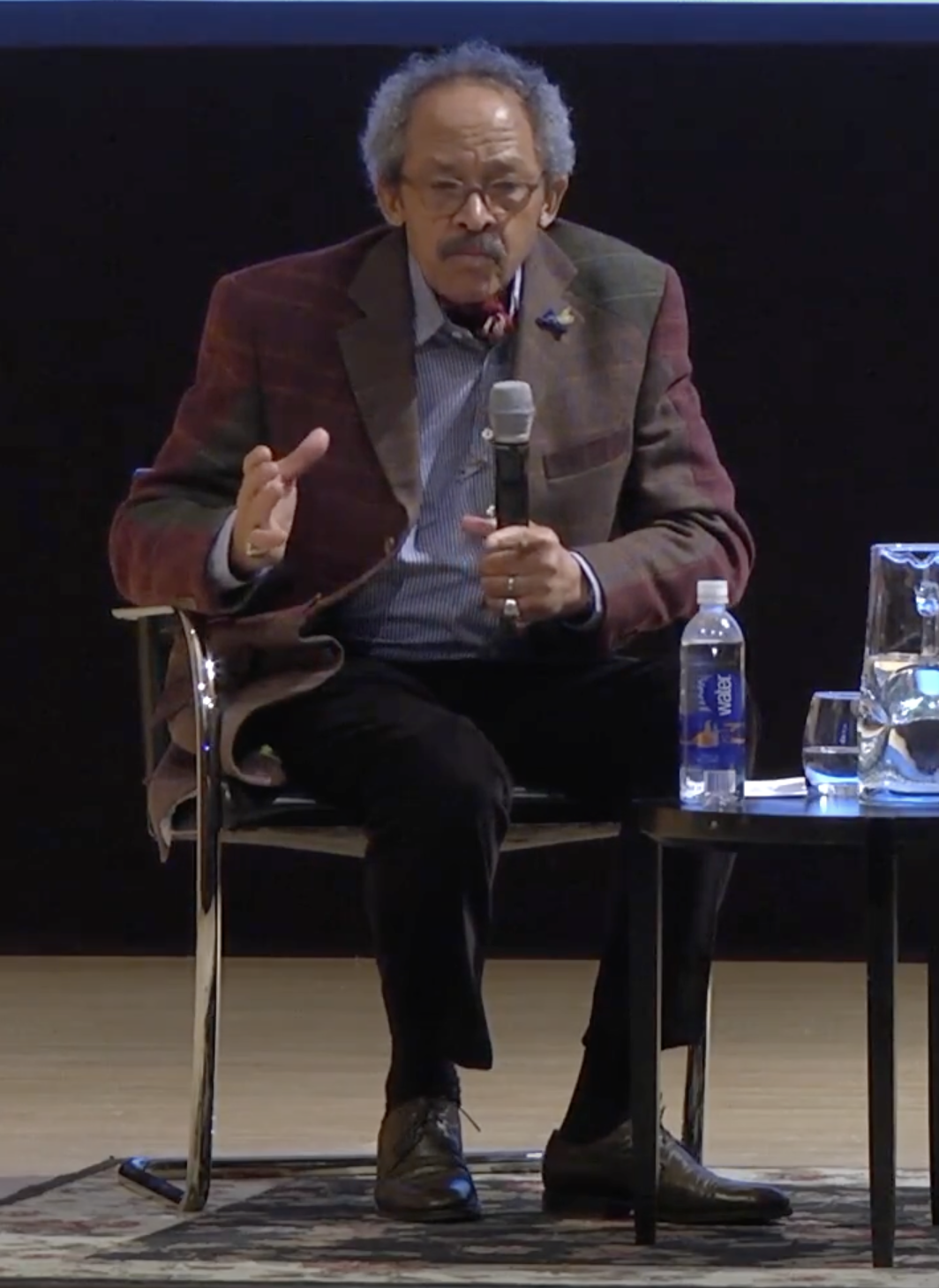
- Whitten in 2017 at the Brooklyn Museum
- Born: December 5, 1939
- Died: January 20, 2018 (aged 78)
- Education: Cooper Union (BFA)
- Occupation: Artist
- Known for: Painting, sculpture
- Spouse: Florence Squires (divorced) Mary Staikos (m. 1968)
- Children: 2
- Awards: National Medal of Arts

Jack Whitten (December 5, 1939 – January 20, 2018) was an American abstract painter and sculptor. According to the Museum of Modern Art, he "invented art-making techniques that were the first of their kind." In 2016, he was awarded a National Medal of Arts.

== Early life and education ==
Jack Whitten was born December 5, 1939 in Bessemer, Alabama, to Mose Whitten and Annie B. Cunningham. His father was a coal miner who died when he was eight years old. His mother was a seamstress who eventually founded a private kindergarten. His first exposure to art was through his mother's first husband, Monroe Cross, a sign painter. He inherited Cross' tools, and as a teenager, he worked painting price tags for local stores. Whitten attended Carver Junior High School and the former Dunbar High School. In addition to art, he played tenor saxophone in a high school band, the Dunbar Jazzettes.

Planning a career as an army doctor, Whitten entered pre-medical studies at Tuskegee Institute from 1957 to 1959. He joined the ROTC, like his older brother, and used the money that he earned from painting store tags to support himself through college. An architecture professor suggested that he should attend Cooper Union to study art. While at Tuskegee, he traveled to Montgomery, Alabama to hear Martin Luther King Jr. speak and to meet him during the Montgomery bus boycott and was deeply moved by his vision for a changed America.

In 1960, Whitten went to Southern University in Baton Rouge, Louisiana to begin studying art and became involved in Civil Rights demonstrations there. He participated in a march from downtown Baton Rouge to the Louisiana State Capitol. His artistic ability led him to be in charge of producing the signs and slogans to be used at that demonstration.

Whitten believed strongly in Martin Luther King Jr.'s nonviolent approach. However, witnessing the violent reactions from the segregationists made him realize that if he remained in the South, he would turn violent himself. In 1960, he followed his Tuskegee professor's advice, and moved to New York City. He enrolled at Cooper Union in the fall of 1960, and was the only Black student in his class. As an undergraduate, Whitten began to carve wood and started creating sculptures. He met his future second wife Mary Staikos, a fellow art student, during his time at Cooper Union. He graduated with a bachelor's degree in fine art in 1964. After graduating, he remained in New York as a working artist, heavily influenced by the abstract expressionists and Black abstractionists then dominating the art community, especially Willem de Kooning and Robert Blackburn, who introduced him to Romare Bearden, who in turn introduced him to Jacob Lawrence and Norman Lewis.

== Life and career ==
Shortly after leaving Cooper Union, Whitten had the opportunity to meet other Black artists, including Jacob Lawrence and Norman Lewis, while he remained in New York to start his art career. In 1964, Whitten completed his first formal series of paintings after university, his Heads series, an exploration of the possibilities of overlap between painting and photography. Created by suspending a painted canvas between two additional pieces of stretched fabric, these paintings primarily comprised a central area of translucent white pigment against black, resembling an abstracted face or head floating in space.

Whitten's art style was abstract, and he referred to his work as having "truth" and "soul". Much of Whitten's artwork was inspired by his experiences during the Civil Rights Movement. Whitten concluded that slavery obstructed the culture of people of color, and believed that it was his destiny to restore the culture through his pieces.

Whitten's earliest paintings date back to the 1960s. A large portion of Whitten's artwork had a feathery, soft effect, which Whitten achieved by placing a nylon mesh fabric over his wet acrylic paintings. Whitten also used a T-shaped tool, which he called the "developer". Whitten would move the tool across the surface of his art in one single motion. This technique was used to represent one point being related to another.

After his brother's death in an apartment fire in New York in 1966, Whitten made a painting in his brother's honor, the first of a series of memorial paintings dedicated to friends, family, and notable public figures. Whitten and Staikos married in 1968. In 1969, Whitten began traveling annually to the Greek island of Crete with Staikos, a Greek-American. He eventually acquired a studio on the island which he used for his sculpture practice.

Black Monolith I, A Tribute to James Baldwin (1988) at Glenstone in 2023

One of Whitten's most famous bodies of work is his Black Monolith Series. Most of the work in this series was a homage or tribute to black activists, politicians, and artists. The two best-known works from this series includes Whitten's Black Monolith III For Barbara Jordan, 1998, and Black Monolith II, Homage to Ralph Ellison The Invisible Man, 1994.

Whitten's work was featured in the Annual Exhibition of Contemporary American Painting at the Whitney Museum of American Art in 1972. The Whitney mounted a solo exhibition of his paintings in 1974. Solo exhibitions of his work have also been held at numerous museums, galleries, and universities, including a 10-year retrospective in 1983 at the Studio Museum in Harlem and an exhibition of memorial paintings in 2008 at the Atlanta Contemporary Arts Center in Atlanta, Georgia.

From 1974 to 1995, Whitten was a professor of painting at Cooper Union, his alma mater.

In 1974, Whitten participated in a residency at the Xerox corporation, giving him access to the then-new technology required for xerography printing. After the residency, Whitten experimented with a range of drawings made with toner.

Throughout his career, Whitten concerned himself with the techniques and materials of painting and the relationship of artworks to their inspirations. At times he pursued quickly-applied gestural techniques akin to photography or printmaking, while at others his deliberate and constructive hand is evident. The New York Times labeled him the father of a "new abstraction."

9.11.01 (2006) at the Baltimore Museum of Art in 2022

When the terrorist attacks on the World Trade Center occurred, Whitten was at his studio on Lispenard Street in Tribeca. In the following years, he constructed a monumental painting titled 9.11.01 with ashes embedded in it as a memorial of the day.

President Barack Obama awarded Whitten the National Medal of Arts in 2015.

== Exhibitions ==
In 2013, curator Katy Siegel organized the exhibition Light Years: Jack Whitten, 1971-73 at the Rose Art Museum at Brandeis University. The exhibition featured many works created by Whitten between 1971 and 1973 which had never been exhibited before. In 2014, the Museum of Contemporary Art San Diego hosted a 50–year retrospective exhibition of Whitten's work; the show later traveled to the Wexner Center for the Arts in Columbus, Ohio and the Walker Art Center in Minneapolis. As part of his Walker engagement, Whitten wrote an Artist Op-Ed on racism and "the role of art in times of unspeakable violence."

In 2018, the Baltimore Museum of Art hosted the retrospective exhibition Odyssey: Jack Whitten Sculpture 1963–2016, primarily focused on Whitten's sculptural practice. Organized at the end of Whitten's life and opened shortly after his passing, the exhibition also traveled to the Met Breuer in New York and the Museum of Fine Arts, Houston. In 2019, the Hamburger Bahnhof–Museum für Gegenwart – part of the Berlin National Gallery – hosted the retrospective Jack Whitten: Jack's Jacks, Whitten's first solo exhibition in a European museum.

In March 2025, the Museum of Modern Art, led by curator Michelle Kuo, presented Jack Whitten: The Messenger, the first monographic exhibit to showcase the entire range of Whitten's artistic media, including sculpture, painting, and printmaking.

== Art market ==
Whitten was represented by Hauser & Wirth (2016–2018), Alexander Gray Associates (2007–2016), and Zeno X Gallery.

== Personal life ==
Whitten married Florence Squires in the early 1960s and divorced soon after. He remarried to Mary Staikos in 1968, whom he had met as a student at Cooper Union. He had two children from his two marriages, both girls.

Whitten died in Manhattan at NewYork-Presbyterian Hospital on January 20, 2018, at the age of 78 of complications from leukemia. Whitten and his second wife Mary resided in Queens, New York, at the time of his death.

== Notable works in public collections ==
- Homage to Malcolm (1965); Metropolitan Museum of Art, New York
- NY Battle Ground (1967); Museum of Modern Art, New York
- John Lennon Altarpiece (1968); San Francisco Museum of Modern Art
- Slip Zone (1971); Dallas Museum of Art
- Pink Psyche Queen (1973); Museum of Contemporary Art Chicago
- Chinese Sincerity (1974); Museum of Contemporary Art San Diego
- Siberian Salt Grinder (1974); Museum of Modern Art, New York
- Sorcerer's Apprentice (1974); Whitney Museum, New York
- Sphinx Alley II (1975); National Gallery of Art, Washington, D.C.
- Epsilon Group I (1976); Dallas Museum of Art
- Epsilon Group II (1977); Tate, London
- Khee I (1978); Studio Museum in Harlem, New York
- Khee II (1978); Art Institute of Chicago
- Black Monolith I, A Tribute to James Baldwin (1988); Glenstone, Potomac, Maryland
- Natural Selection (1994); Museum of Fine Arts, Houston
- 9.11.01 (2006); Baltimore Museum of Art
- Atopolis: For Édouard Glissant (2014); Museum of Modern Art, New York
- Black Monolith XI, Six Kinky Strings: For Chuck Berry (2017); Glenstone, Potomac, Maryland

== Publications ==
- Whitten, Jack (Fall 2016). "The Refactoring of Painting: A Talk by Jack Whitten". Black Renaissance/Renaissance Noire. Vol. 16, no. 2. pp. 62–69, 142. OCLC 34971120. ProQuest 1855776880.
- Whitten, Jack (2018). Siegel, Katy (ed.). Jack Whitten: Notes from the Woodshed. Zurich: Hauser & Wirth. ISBN 9783906915173. OCLC 1041227878.
- Whitten, Jack (2018). "Why Do I Carve Wood?". In Siegel, Katy (ed.). Odyssey: Jack Whitten, Sculpture 1963–2017. Baltimore / New York: Baltimore Museum of Art / Gregory R. Miller & Co. pp. 36–39. ISBN 9781941366172. OCLC 1022977718.

== Citations and references ==
=== Cited references ===
- Baum, Kelly (2018). "Continental Drift: The Sculptures of Jack Whitten". In Siegel, Katy (ed.). Odyssey: Jack Whitten, Sculpture 1963–2017. Baltimore / New York: Baltimore Museum of Art / Gregory R. Miller & Co. pp. 138–145. ISBN 9781941366172. OCLC 1022977718.
- Beckstette, Sven (2019). "Extending the Meaning of Abstraction: Jack Whitten's Work in the Gap between Form and Content". In Kittelmann, Udo; Beckstette, Sven (eds.). Jack Whitten: Jack's Jacks (in English and German). Berlin / Munich: Nationalgalerie im Hamburger Bahnhof Museum für Gegenwart / Prestel Publishing. pp. 45–63. ISBN 9783791358628. OCLC 1112503550.
- De Salvo, Donna (2023). "'Gray is Power': Jack Whitten's Xerox Project". In De Salvo, Donna; Guidelli-Guidi, Matilde; O'Dwyer, Deirdre (eds.). Jack Whitten: The Greek Alphabet Paintings. New York: Dia Art Foundation. pp. 41–51. ISBN 9780944521991. OCLC 1374494397.
- Kanjo, Kathryn (2015). "Facing Abstraction". Jack Whitten: Five Decades of Painting. Museum of Contemporary Art San Diego. pp. 18–39. ISBN 9780934418744. OCLC 910702740.
- Siegel, Katy, ed. (2018). "Polytropos". Odyssey: Jack Whitten, Sculpture 1963–2017. Baltimore / New York: Baltimore Museum of Art / Gregory R. Miller & Co. pp. 12–27. ISBN 9781941366172. OCLC 1022977718.
