= Frank Meisler =

Israeli architect and sculptor

Frank Meisler פרנק מייסלר
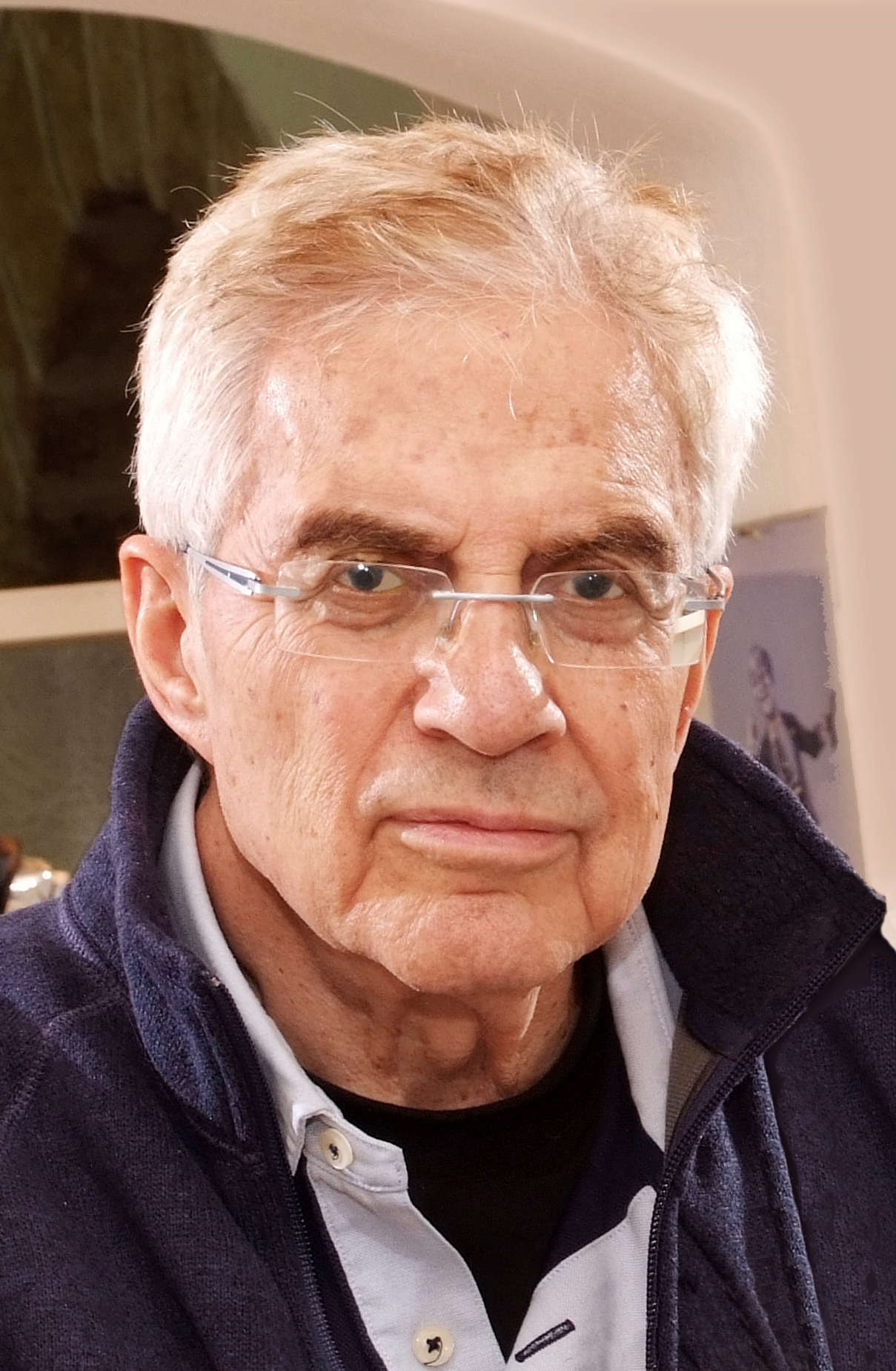
- Portrait of Frank Meisler on his 87th birthday (30 Dec. 2012), Old City Jaffa-Tel Aviv
- Born: 30 December 1925; Free City of Danzig
- Died: 24 March 2018 (aged 92); Jaffa, Israel
- Resting place: Givat Brenner cemetery, Israel
- Known for: Sculpture
- Website: http://frank-meisler.com/

Frank Meisler (Hebrew: פרנק מייסלר; 30 December 1925 – 24 March 2018) was an Israeli architect and sculptor. Meisler was born in the Free City of Danzig and grew up in England, before moving to Israel in 1956. In 1953 he married Batya (Phyllis) Hochman with whom he had two daughters: Michal Meisler Yehuda and Marit Meisler. He died in Jaffa in 2018.

== Biography ==
Frank Meisler was born into a Jewish family in Danzig (now Gdańsk, Poland), he was evacuated by the Kindertransport in August 1939, travelling with other Jewish children via Berlin to the Netherlands and then to Liverpool Street station in London. His parents were later murdered at Auschwitz concentration camp. He was raised by an aunt, who lived in London. He attended school in Harrow, and then did national service in the Royal Air Force. He studied architecture at the University of Manchester, and was involved in the construction of the Heathrow Airport.

He moved to Israel in the late 1950s, where he later opened a workshop and gallery in the Old City of Jaffa. he also erected public sculptures including a memorial to Ben Gurion in Israel, Eternal Kiev in Kiev, and a series of Kindertransport memorials: Kindertransport – The Arrival erected at Liverpool Street station in London in 2006, Trains to Life – Trains to Death erected at Friedrichstraße station in Berlin in 2008, The Departure erected at Gdańsk Główny station in 2009, Crossing to Life erected at the Hook of Holland in 2011 and The final parting erected at Hamburg Dammtor station. He also designed the interior of the Holocaust Memorial Synagogue in Moscow, and sculptures for Russia's National War Memorial. A memorial of the death march of Jewish prisoners (and subsequent murders at Palmnicken) was erected in Kaliningrad (formerly Königsberg) in 2011. He published an autobiography. On the Vistula Facing East, in 1996.

== Architecture and art in general ==
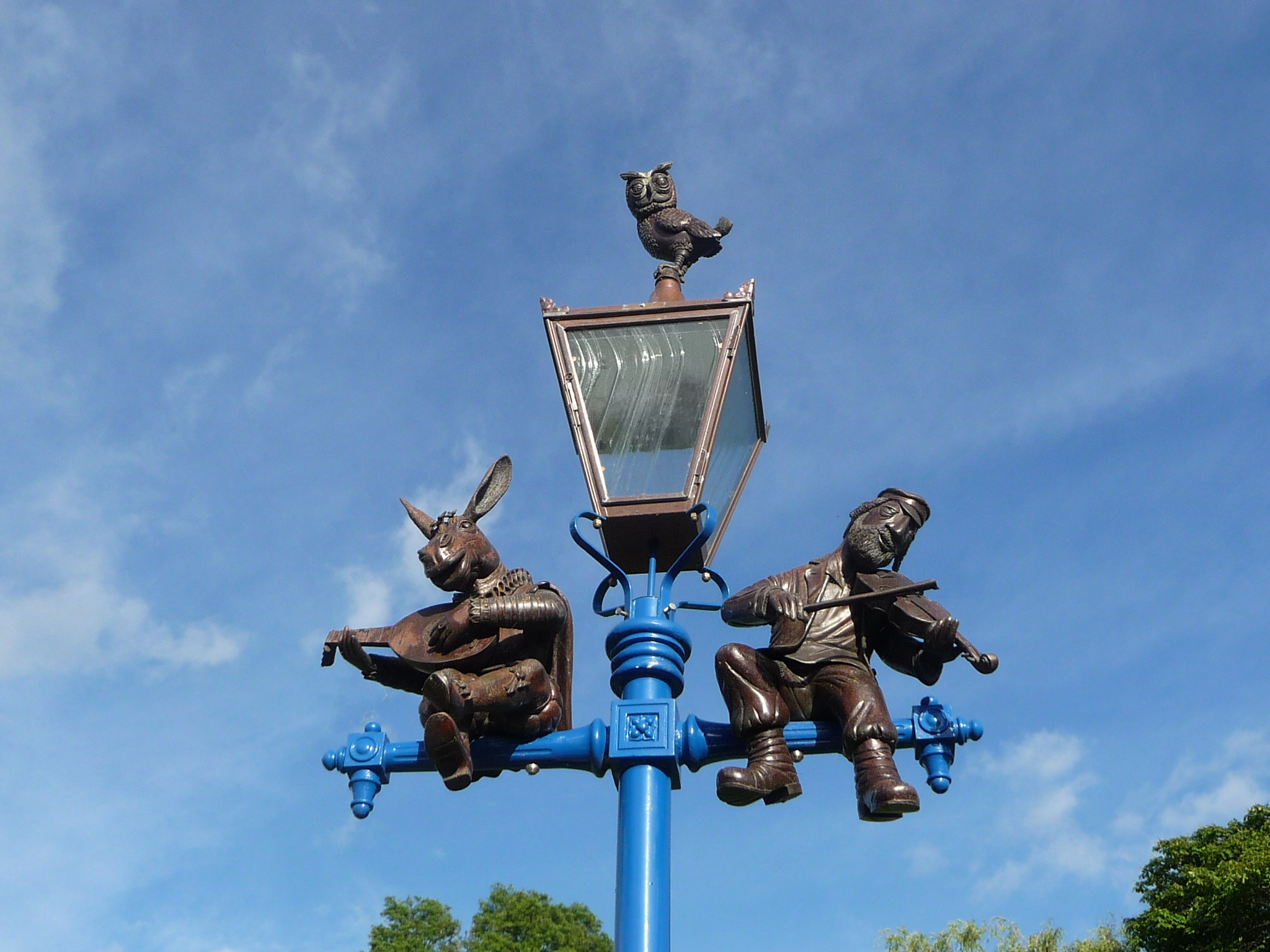
Sculpture in Stratford-upon-Avon

- Sculpture in Stratford-upon-Avon
- Israel: Monument to David Ben-Gurion
- after 1987: Memorial in front of the Mannheim synagogue, a monument made of stones from the main synagogue blown up in 1938 commemorates the victims of the persecution of the Jewish people
- 1998: Interior design of the Holocaust Memorial Synagogue (Moscow)
- 1999: Foyer, prayer room and Torah ark in the Golden Rose Synagogue (Dnipro)
- 2008: Statue of Churchill, Stalin and Roosevelt at the Yalta Conference in Sochi
- 2009: The Eternal Kyiv, Kyiv
- 2011, Memorial in Yantarny, Kaliningrad Oblast: hands raised to the sky to commemorate the Palmnicken massacre of around 3,000 Jewish female prisoners in the Stutthof satellite camps in January 1945
- Monument to Christopher Columbus in Madrid
- Fountain in Jerusalem

== Awards and recognition ==
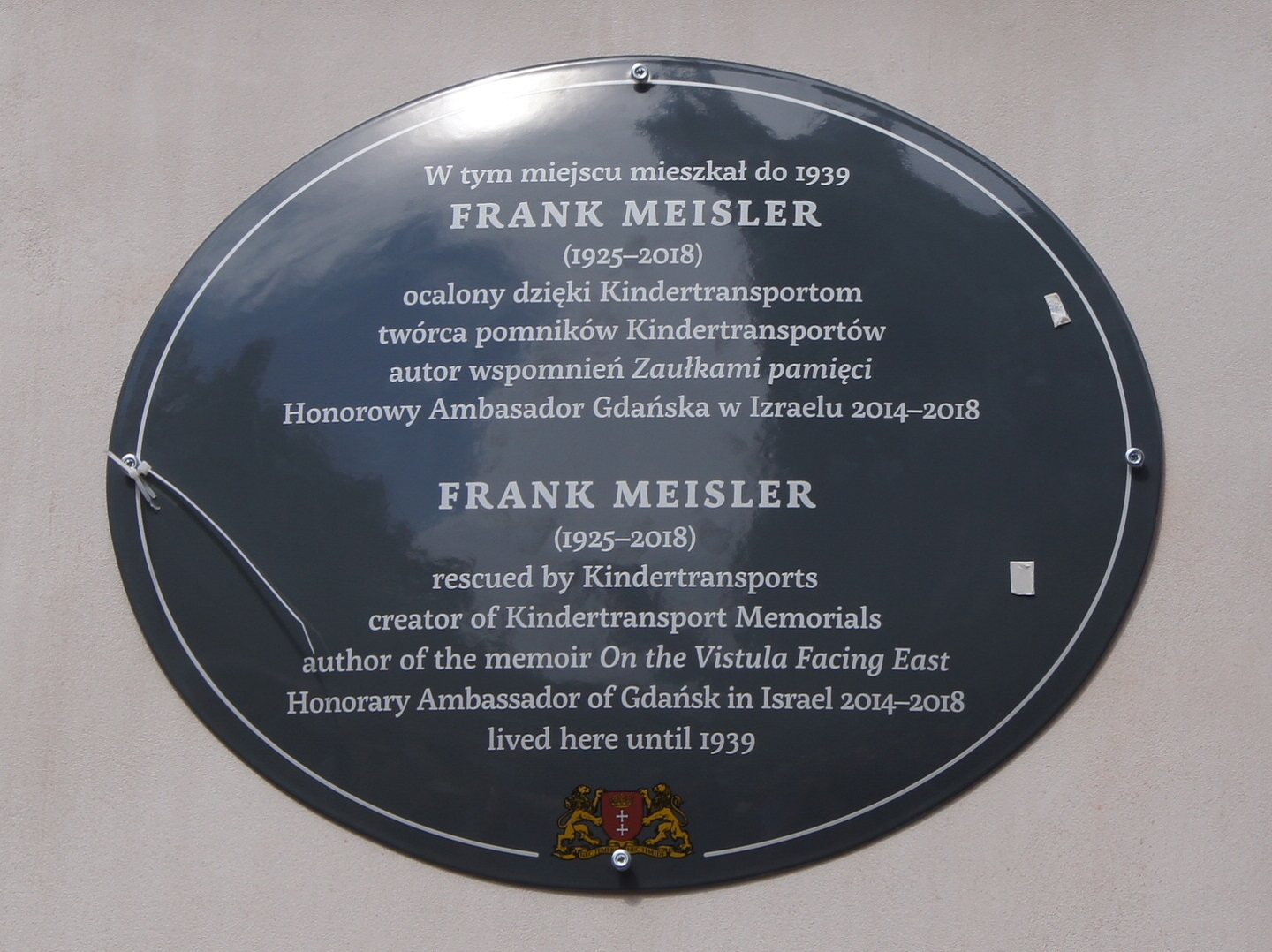
Frank Meisler memorial plaque in Gdańsk unveiled in 2018

The Czech Academy of Art awarded Meisler the 'Franz Kafka gold medal' in 1999. He was made an honorary academician by both the Russian Academy of Arts and the Ukrainian Academy of Arts in 2002. He was awarded the Federal Republic of Germany's Officer's Cross of the Order of Merit (Verdienstkreuz 1. Klasse) in 2012, in recognition of his services to German-Jewish and German-Israeli relations. He was honored with ‘The Freedom of the City of London’ honorary award and dined at Prince Charles's table. In 2018, after his death, a street sign was placed by the late mayor Adamowicz in Frank’s home town of Gdańsk on the house wall where he grew up.

== Gallery ==
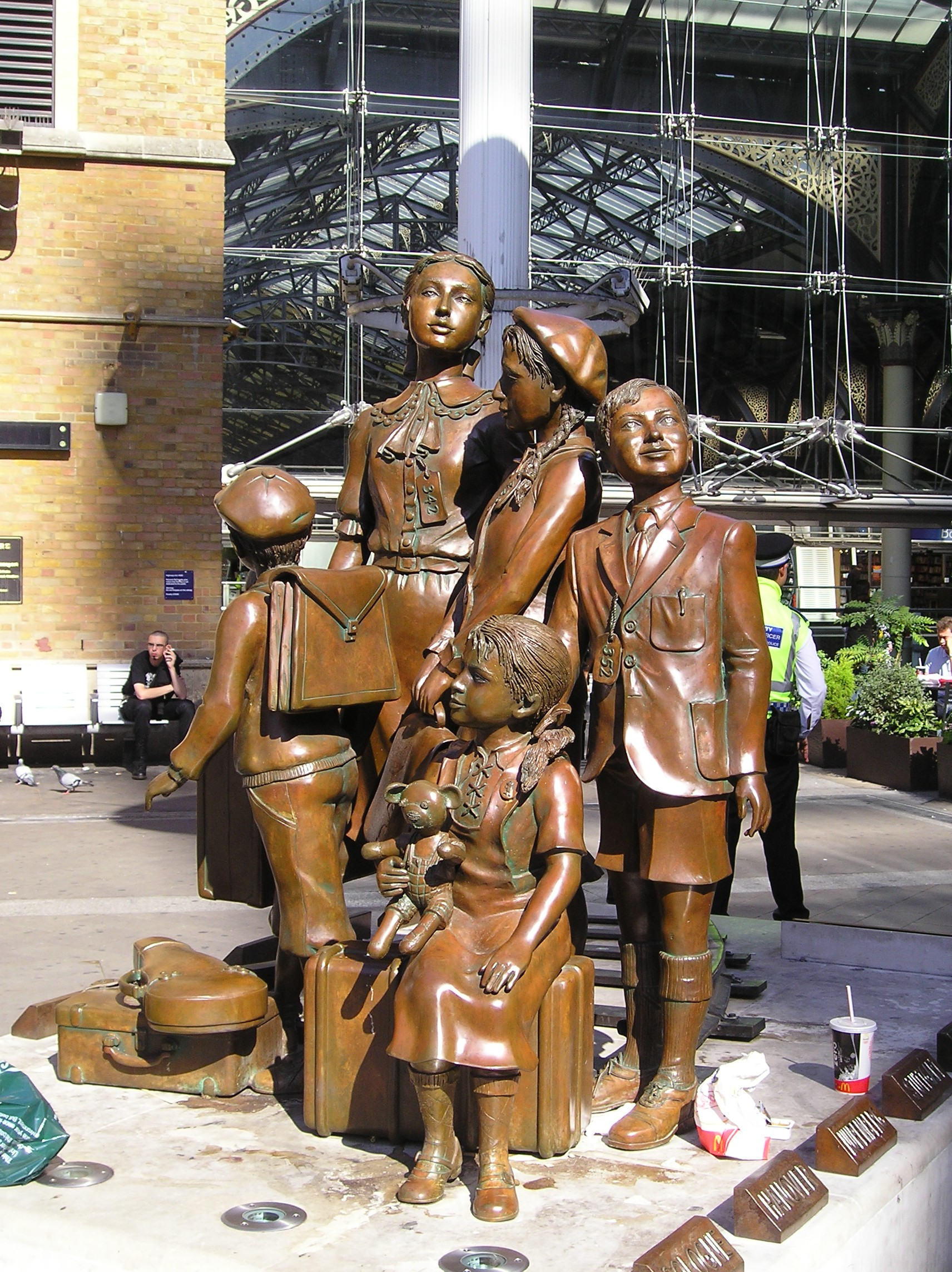
Kindertransport – The Arrival, Liverpool Street station, London

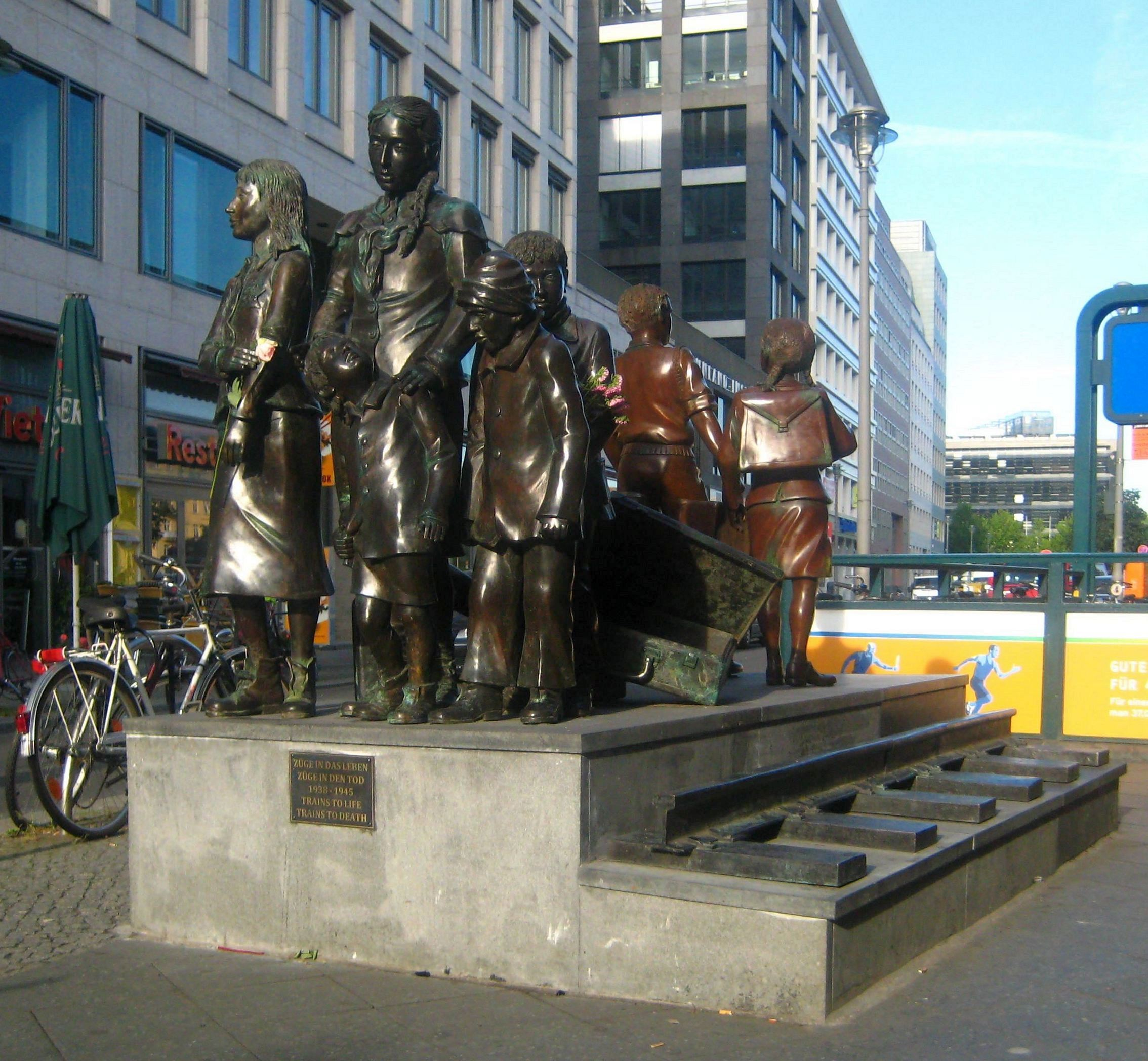
Trains to Life – Trains to Death, Friedrichstraße station, Berlin

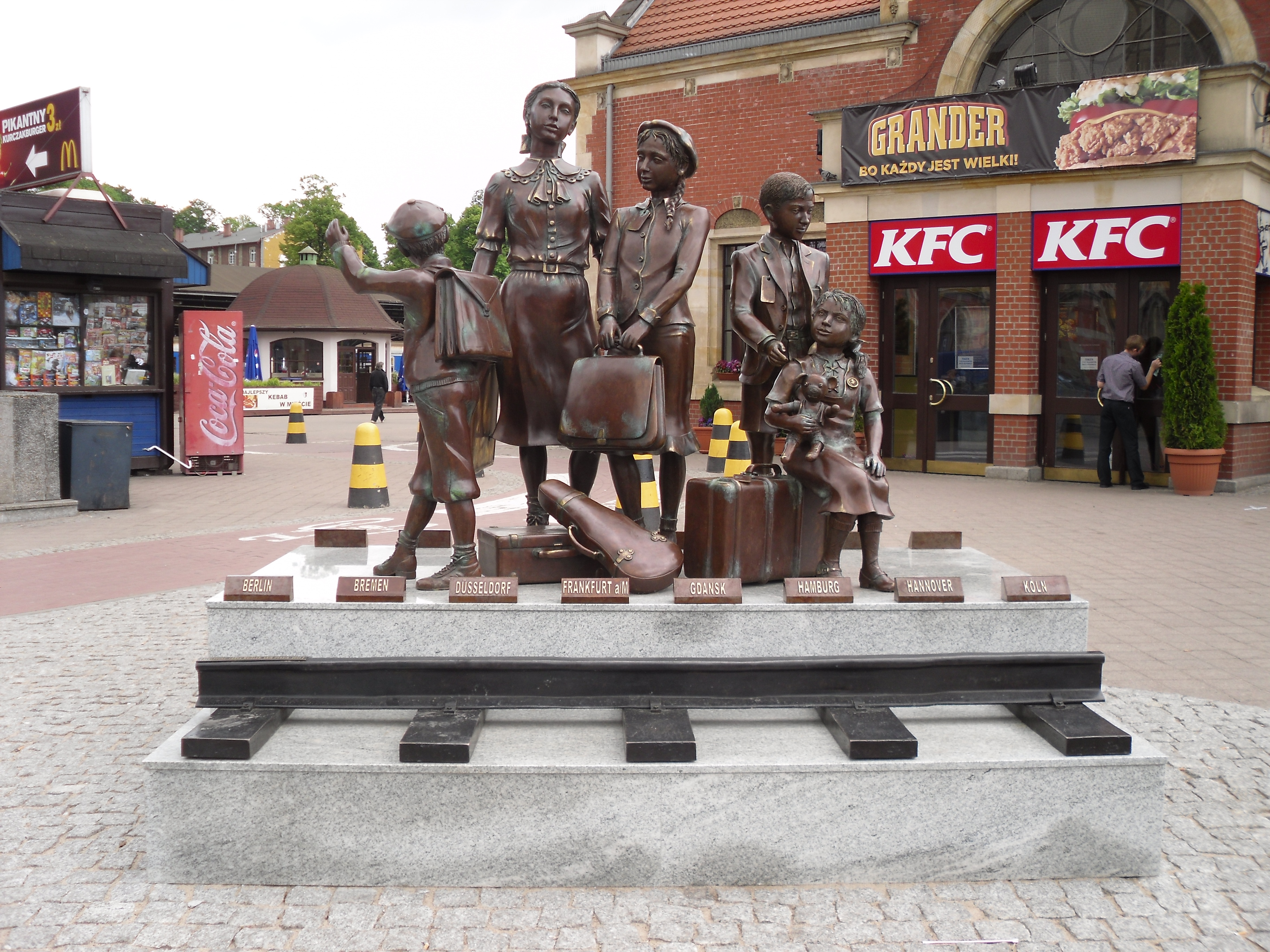
Die Abreise in front of Gdańsk Główny station

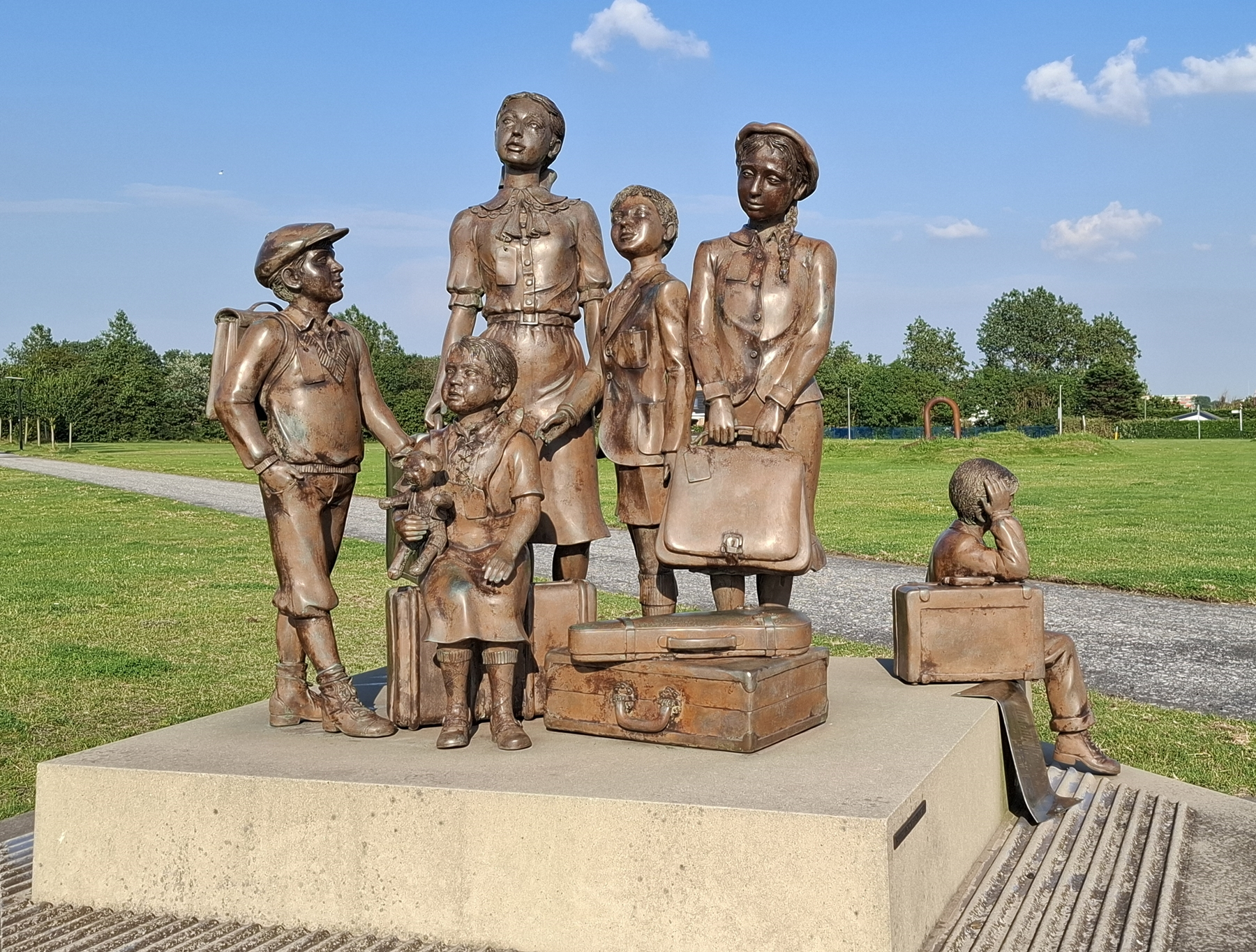
Kindertransport Monument Hoek van Holland Channel Crossing to Life, Hook of Holland

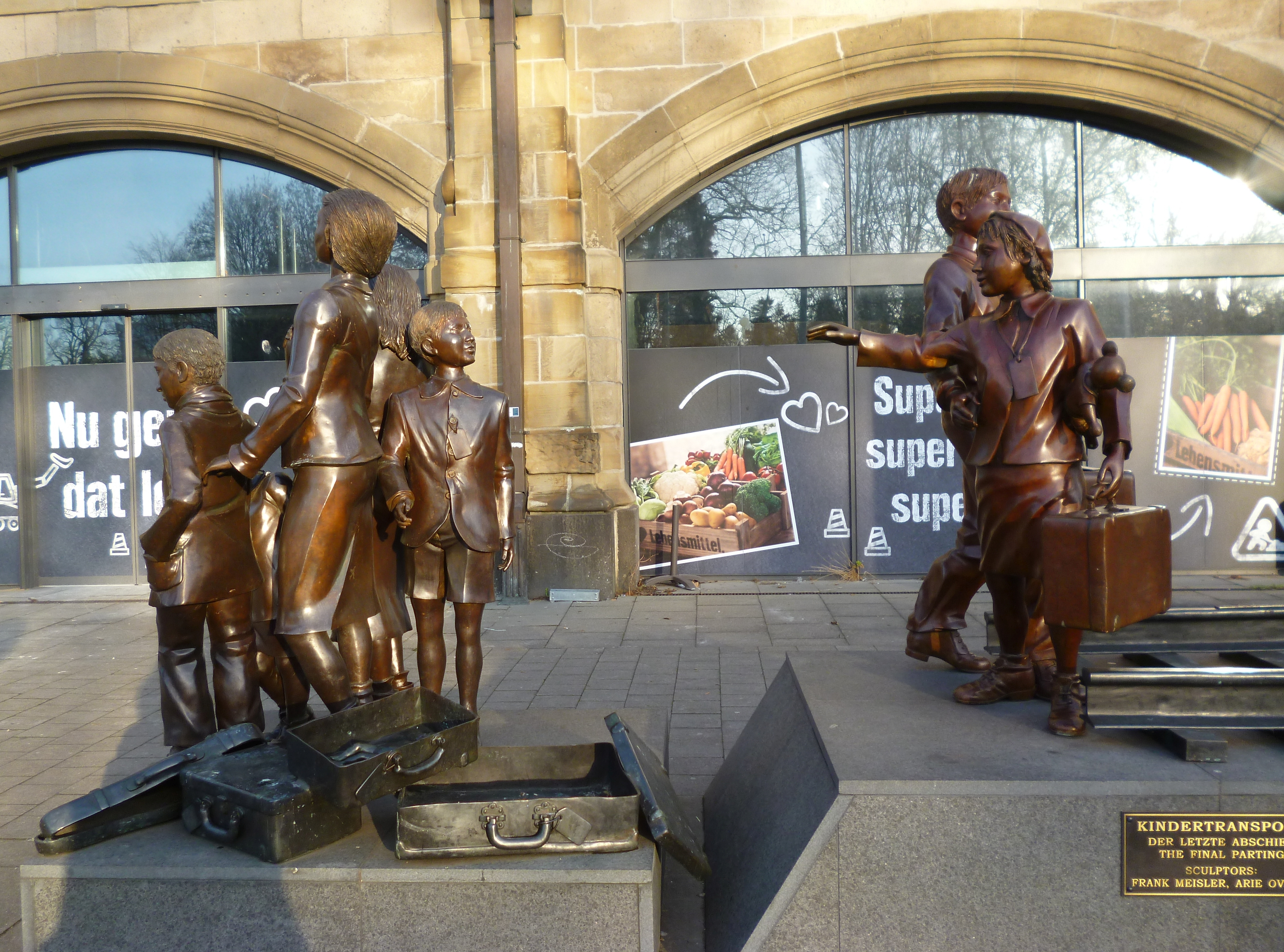
Kindertransport – Der letzte Abschied - The final parting, Hamburg Dammtor station

== Literature ==
- Frank Meisler, 1996. On the Vistula facing East. London. ISBN 0-233-99022-4. Autobiography.
- Miłosława Borzyszkowska-Szewczyk, Uwe Neumärker (ed.), 2016. An der Weichsel gegen Osten. Mein Leben zwischen Danzig, London und Jaffa. Stiftung Denkmal für die ermordeten Juden Europas mit dem Instytut Kaszubski w Gdańsku. Berlin, ISBN 978-3-942240-24-6.
- Marie-Catherine Allard (27 April 2020). Modelling bridges between past and current issues of forced migration: Frank Meisler’s memorial sculpture Kindertransport – The Arrival. In: Jewish historical studies, vol. 51 issue 1, p. 86-104.

== See also ==
- Israeli sculpture
- Visual arts in Israel
