= 9.11.01 =

2006 mosaic work by Jack Whitten

- Artist: Jack Whitten
- Year: 2006 (completed)
- Medium: Mosaic with blood, ash, dust, and other materials
- Location: Baltimore Museum of Art, Baltimore, Maryland

9.11.01 is a 2006 mosaic work by the American visual artist Jack Whitten (1930–2018).

Whitten whose studio was on Lipsenard Street in the Tribeca neighborhood of Manhattan, which is in close vicinity to the World Trade Center site, was an eyewitness to the September 11 attacks in New York City and did not make any art for five years except for this work.

Therein this work took as many years to create and consists of thousands of acrylic tiles as well as other materials which were part of that horrible day such as ash, dust, and blood. The undertaking of the work came at a time where the artist had already begun experimenting with the medium of mosaic.

The work is held in the permanent collection of the Baltimore Museum of Art. The piece was included and highlighted in the 2025 posthumous career survey of Whitten's work at MoMA in New York City. The central form of the painting, the black pyramid is taken from the one on the back of the U.S. one-dollar bill.

Ben Davis writing on Artnet compared the 9.11.01 to another work of epic scale, that being Pablo Picasso's Guernica.
