= Aleksander Kamiński Memorial =

Monument in Warsaw, Poland

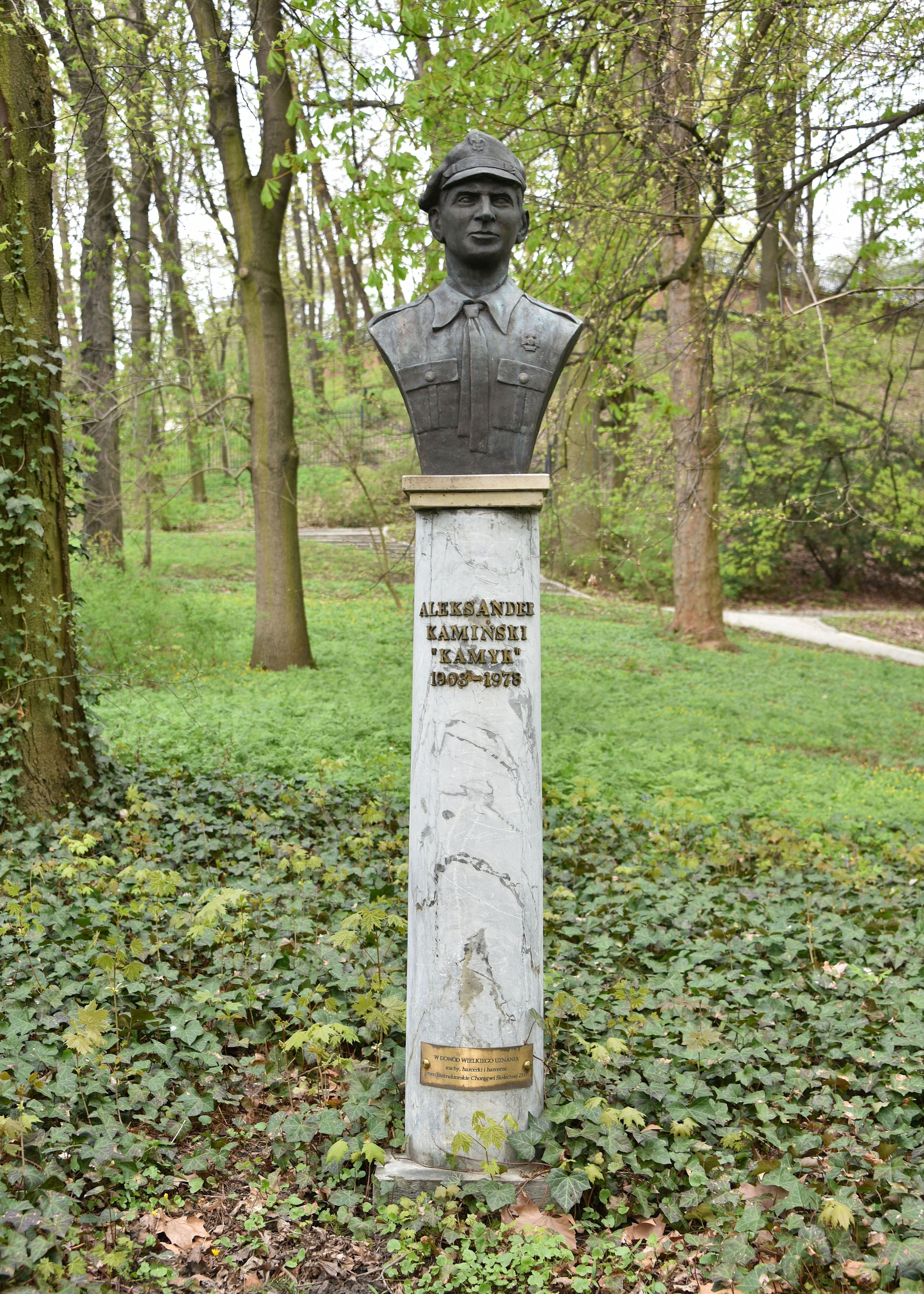
- The monument in 2017.
- Interactive map of Aleksander Kamiński Memorial
- Location: Royal Baths Park, Downtown, Warsaw, Poland
- Coordinates: 52.211454°N 21.028580°E
- Designer: Wiesław Winkler
- Type: Bust
- Material: Bronze
- Opening date: 2006
- Dedicated to: Aleksander Kamiński

Aleksander Kamiński Memorial (Polish pronunciation: [a.lɛkˈsan.dɛr kaˈmiɲ.ski]; Polish: Pomnik Aleksandra Kamińskiego) is a sculpture in Warsaw, Poland, within the neighbourhood of Ujazdów in the Downtown district. It has a form of a bronze bust of Aleksander Kamiński, a 20th-century school teacher and soldier, who during the Second World War was one of the leaders of the Grey Ranks resistance organisation in German-occupied Poland. The sculpture was designed by Wiesław Winkler and unveiled in 2006. It is located in the southeastern part of the Royal Baths Park, near the Egyptian Temple.

== History ==
The monument was dedicated to Aleksander Kamiński, a 20th-century school teacher and soldier, who during the Second World War was one of the leaders of the Grey Ranks resistance organisation operating in the German-occupied Poland. The sculpture was designed by Wiesław Winkler and unveiled in 2006.

== Characteristics ==
The monument has a form of a bronze bust of Aleksander Kamiński, wearing a uniform of a Polish Scouting and Guiding Association member, as well as a rogatywka scout hat. The sculpture is placed on a pedestal, which features inscription that reads "Aleksander Kamiński 'Kamyk' 1903–1978". It is located in the southeastern part of the Royal Baths Park, near the Egyptian Temple.
