= Arjun Prajapati =

Indian artist (1957–2020)

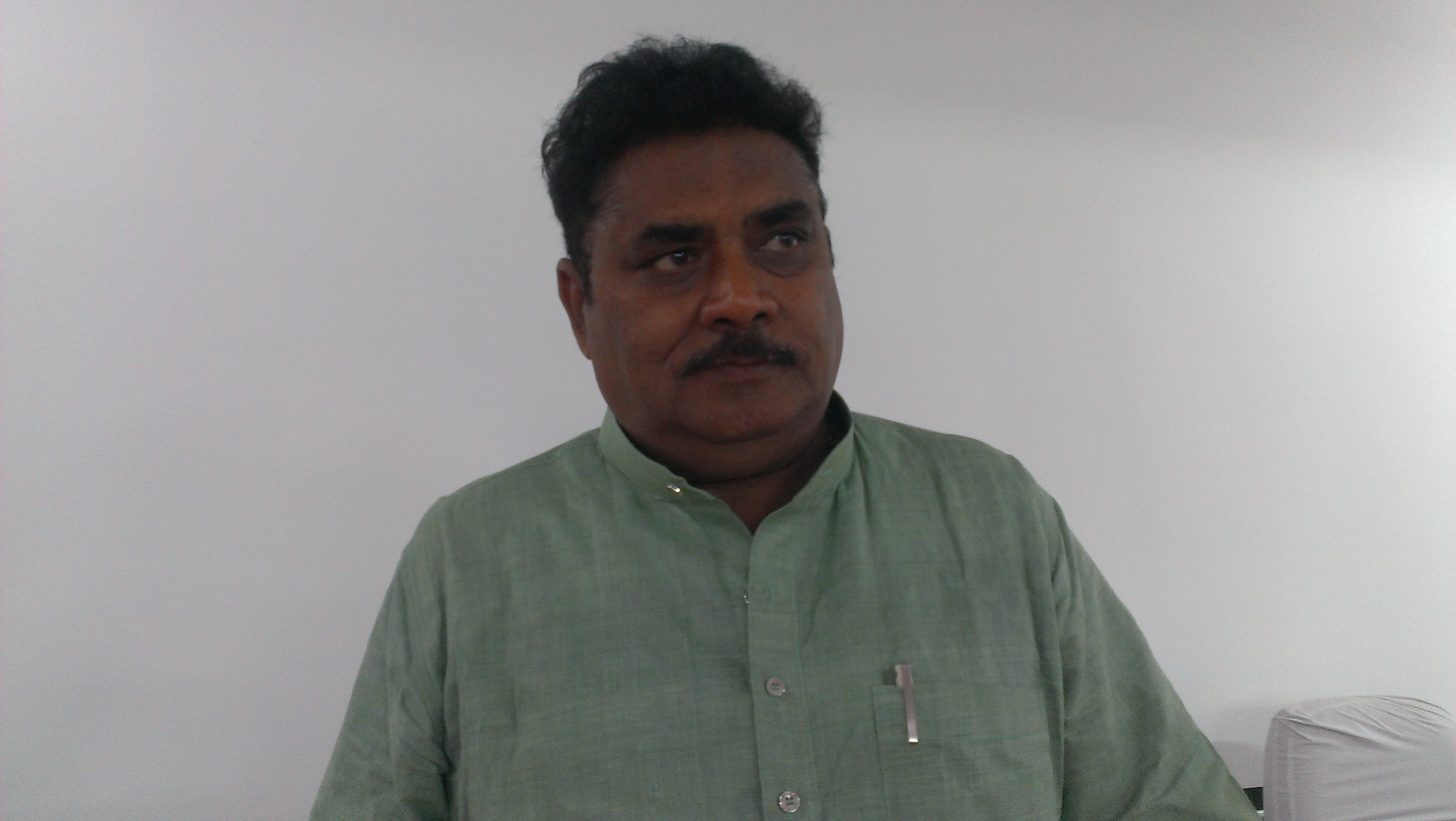
- Arjun Prajapati in University of Rajasthan
- Born: 1957; India
- Died: 12 November 2020 (aged 62–63); Jaipur, Rajasthan, India
- Occupation: Artist
- Known for: Pottery, Sculptures
- Awards: Padma Shri (2010) Shilp Guru (2016)

Arjun Prajapati (1957 – 12 November 2020) was an Indian artist from Jaipur, Rajasthan, known for his pottery and sculptures.

He had played a vital role in modern Rajasthani sculpture. He is master in cloning and known as the master of cloning.

He had made many sculptures in which his famous work is "Bani Tani" in clay.

== Biography ==
He was born in 1957 in India. He received the Padma Shri Award in 2010. He died on 12 November 2020, in Jaipur, Rajasthan due to Coronavirus.

== Awards ==
- National Award from Ministry of textiles
- Shilp Guru 2016
- Padma Shree

== See also ==
- Indian pottery
