= Carmelina (disambiguation) =

Carmelina is a feminine given name. People with the name include:

- Carmelina Cruz Silva, Mexican politician
- Carmelina Delfin (died after 1948), Cuban composer and pianist
- Carmelina Moscato (born 1984), Canadian soccer coach and former professional player
- Carmelina Rotundo (born 1953), Italian journalist, blogger and teacher
- Carmelina Sánchez-Cutillas i Martínez del Romero (1921–2009), Spanish historian, novelist and poet
- Carmelina Soto (1916–1994), Colombian poet

== Other uses ==
- Carmelina, musical with a book by Joseph Stein and Alan Jay Lerner, lyrics by Lerner, and music by Burton Lane
