= Brunelli =

Brunelli is an Italian surname. Notable people with the surname include:

- Antonio Brunelli (1577–1630), Italian composer
- Austin R. Brunelli (1907–1989), highly decorated combat veteran of World War II and the Korea War
- Camilla Brunelli (born 1957), Italian historian
- Carlotta Brunelli (born 1993), Italian weightlifter
- Flaminio Giulio Brunelli (1936–2004), Italian physician and biologist
- Giacomo Brunelli (born 1977), Italian artist working with photography
- Giuseppe Brunelli (1922–2016), Italian poet
- Marcello Brunelli (1939–2020), Italian neurophysiologist and academic
- Massimo Brunelli (born 1961), Italian former cyclist
- Matteo Brunelli (born 1994), Italian footballer
- Michela Brunelli (born 1974), Italian athlete
- Nick Brunelli (born 1981), American swimmer
- Sam Brunelli (born 1943), American football player
- Santiago Brunelli (born 1998), Uruguayan footballer

== See also ==
- Luciano Brunelli, Italian textile company
- Brunello (surname)
- Brunello (disambiguation)
