= Brunello (given name) =

Brunello is an Italian masculine given name

- Brunello Bertolin (born 1943), long-distance runner
- Brunello Rondi (1924–1989), screenwriter and film director
- Brunello Spinelli (1939–2018), Italian water polo player
- Brunello Cucinelli (born 1953), billionaire fashion designer

== See also ==
- Brunello (surname)
- Brunello (disambiguation)
- Bruno (given name)
