= Amicale de Mauthausen =

The Amicale de Mauthausen is a French association in memory of the history of the Mauthausen-Gusen concentration camp.

Shortly after the end of World War II, on 1 October 1945, the organization named l'Amicale des déportés politiques de la Résistance de Mauthausen et de ses kommandos dépendants was founded. The original members were survivors of CC Mauthausen-Gusen and its subcamps.

Amicale de Mauthausen discovered that 198,000 people of 25 different nationalities (10,000 of them French) were deported to CC Mauthausen. 118,000 people died from forced labor or in one of the gas chambers, which were installed inside of the camp. Particularly in the postwar years, but also today, the Amicale helps families of the missing and their children.

Since its founding, Amicale has been teaching about the crimes of national socialism. Amicale appears at various international events, e.g., commemorations of the liberation of Mauthausen. They also arrange excursions to Mauthausen.

In the year 2000, there was an official generation change. Because of their age, the survivors of the camp handed over their functions to their children. There are still about 500 deportees and their families working for the association to commemorate their suffering.

The French Amical is a member of the Comité International de Mauthausen with around 1700 members in total. The head office is in Paris, but there are many members elsewhere too.

At the head office, there is the possibility for Austrians to serve for a short time instead of the military service as an Austrian Holocaust Memorial Servant. The first Austrian Holocaust Memorial Servant started to work in Paris on 1 September 2008.

== See also ==
- La Fondation pour la Mémoire de la Déportation
- International concentration camp committees
