= Marcello Fabbri =

Italian writer and poet

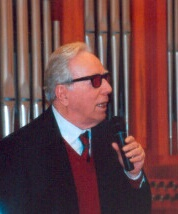
- Born: March 17, 1923; Florence, Italy
- Died: June 18, 2015 (aged 92); Florence, Italy
- Occupation: Poet

Marcello Fabbri (1923-2015) was an Italian writer and poet born in Florence, Italy, where he lived and wrote.

Fabbri graduated with a degree in jurisprudence. He fought in World War II and recorded much of his war experiences, which affected him deeply, in his work.

In 1970, Fabbri lost his sight in an auto accident. Much of his verse is dedicated to the transcendence of the experience.

In 1998, Fabbri was appointed President of the Florentine Chamber of Poets (Camerata dei Poeti) in the tradition of the Florentine Camerata. He was the successor of Otello Pagliai. He was an Academic of the MUSE. Giorgio Bàrberi Squarotti is among Fabbri's colleagues to reference his works.

With Florentine council members Anna Balsamo, Duccia Camiciotti and others, Fabbri organized literary salons and presentations to honour his contemporaries, and poets such as Mario Luzi.

His published works range from poetry to prose of various genres and topics, including epic, lyric, and metaphysical philosophy.

== Published works ==
- Fabbri, Marcello (1980). Il Sole Sulle Scale (The Sun on the Stairs) (in Italian). Il Fauno.
- Fabbri, Marcello (1979). Il Pane di Sasso (Bread of Stone) (in Italian). Il Fauno - Editore.
- Fabbri, Marcello. Al Nemico Sconosciuto (To the Unknown Enemy) (in Italian). Nardini, Firenze.
- Fabbri, Marcello (1997). Dal Quadrante Dell'Ombra (in Italian). Medicea-Firenze, II edizione.
- Fabbri, Marcello. Un Millepiedi Nella Mente (in Italian). Bastogi-Foggia.
- Fabbri, Marcello (1984). Tedesco (Incredibili storie quasi vere di guerra) (in Italian). Editrice Nuova Fortezza.

=== Translations ===
- Fabbri, Marcello (1994). The Light of Memory. Translated by Jeanne R. Bonaca. OlivePress. ISBN 978-0-9631200-4-5.
