= Fausto Sbaffoni =

Italian poet and writer (born 1952)

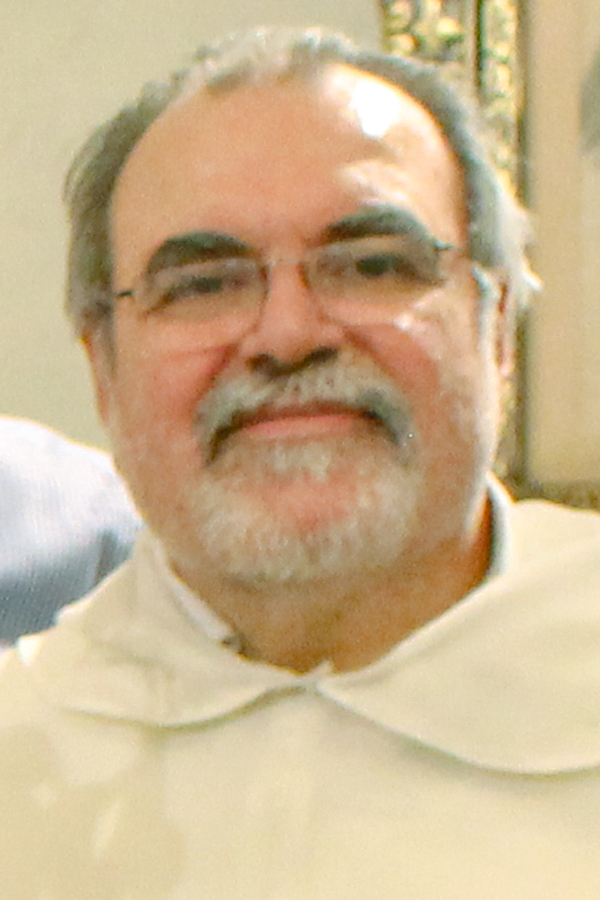
- Born: 28 May 1952 (age 74); Rome
- Occupations: Writer, poet

Fausto Sbaffoni is an Italian poet and writer born, living and working in Rome, Italy. He lived in Florence, in the convent of San Marco.

== Biography ==
Fausto Sbaffoni is an Italian writer and poet who lives in Rome. He took philosophy at the University La Sapienza of Rome and received a doctorate in theology at the University of Friborg. Previously, in Florence, padre Fausto Sbaffoni directed the magazine “Rivista di Ascetica e Mistica” and the biblioteca “Arrigo Levasti”. In 2010, he promoted with La Pergola Arte e Peter Michael Musone the poetic encounter with the poets Duccia Camiciotti and Fausto Sbaffoni "From Florence to the Stars" at the "Consiglio regionale della Toscana", Palazzo Panciatichi, Via Cavour, Florence. In 2011, he promoted the anthology One Hundred Voices to the Sky and presented at the "Consiglio regionale della Toscana".

== Published works ==
- Sbaffoni, Fausto (2011). Briciole di vita (in Italian). Nerbini Editore. ISBN 9788864340555.
- Sbaffoni, Fausto (2009). Trappole e gabbie. (Racconti stellari) (in Italian). Nerbini Editore. ISBN 9788888625942.
- Sbaffoni, Fausto (2008). Canto l'amore (in Italian). Nerbini Editore. ISBN 9788888625751.
- Sbaffoni, Fausto (2005). Pellegrini dell'oltre (in Italian). Nerbini Editore. ISBN 9788888625249.
- Sbaffoni, Fausto (1993). San Tommaso d'Aquino e l'influsso degli angeli. La Sacra Scrittura, la tradizione, la teologia tomista (in Italian). ESD. ISBN 9788870941296.
- Sbaffoni, Fausto (2003). Ammokònia. Alchimia di un'esistenza (in Italian). Nerbini Editore. ISBN 9788888625027.
- Sbaffoni, Fausto (2001). Ammokònia (in Italian). Prov. Romana Frati Predicatori.
- Sbaffoni, Fausto (1992). Testi sull'anticristo Secolo III (in Italian). B12 Biblioteca patristica. ISBN 9788810420232.
- Sbaffoni, Fausto (1992). Testi sull'anticristo Secolo I e II (in Italian). B12 Biblioteca patristica. ISBN 9788810420225.
