= Rotundo =

Rotundo is an Italian surname. Notable people with the surname include:

- Carmelina Rotundo (born 1953), Italian journalist
- David Rotundo (fl. 1991-2017), Canadian blues musician
- Massimo Rotundo (born 1955), Italian comics artist
- Peggy Rotundo (born 1949), American politician
