= Anna Balsamo =

Italian poet

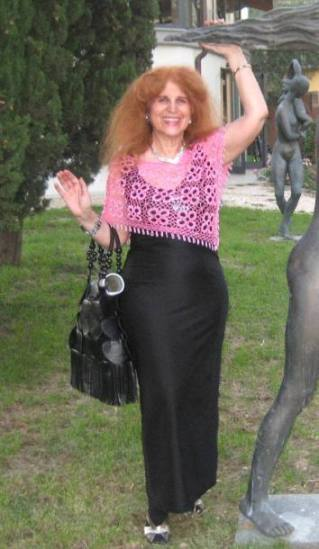
- Italian poet Anna Balsamo
- Born: Pisa, Italy
- Occupation: Poet
- Writing career
- Notable awards: Isbiskos Books Fairs 2008

Anna Balsamo is an Italian poet born in Pisa, Italy, living and working in Florence, Italy.

She began writing for the theater as a teenager, and was next drawn to narrative writing and her stories were recognized in several competitions. A member of Florentine literary salons, she became the editor, then editor-in-chief, of the Italian magazine Firme Nostre (Our Signatures). Her novellas as well as literary and art reviews were published in the magazine, founded and at the time headed by Antonio De Lorenzo.

In 1998, Balsamo became a council member of the new Consiglio della Camerata dei Poeti, the Chamber of Poets in tradition of the Florentine Camerata. Under the presidency of Florentine poet Marcello Fabbri, Balsamo coordinated events in honor of Florentine poet Mario Luzi. The late poet attended full turnout salons that introduced some of his poetry from boyhood years from The Boat (La Barca), as well as key passages from the tragedy Ipazia.

Balsamo created costume design and music for the theatrical poetry presentation of Luzi's Ipazia.

The Chamber coordinates literary events with noted Italian poets such as Giuseppe Brunelli and Duccia Camiciotti.

In 2003, Anna Balsamo was appointed Vice-President to the Florentine association Poets Chamber founded in 1930 by Domenico François on suggestion of Giovanni Papini.

Her books have been featured at Turin, Rome, Frankfurt and Paris book fairs, as well as New York and Mexico. The title Taj Mahal Passion won four Ibiskos literary awards in 2008 and volumes of her poetry have won multiple Italian literary prizes. In the 2011 she is one of the speakers in the poetic event "Da Firenze alle stelle" organized by La Pergola Arte 2° edition with Vanna Bonta, Giancarlo Bianchi and Enrico Nistri in the Basilica of San Marco in the Salone Annigoni.

== Published works ==
- Balsamo, Anna (1988). Imbrigliare lka Chimera (Harnessing lka Chimera) (in Italian).
- Balsamo, Anna (1991). Cielo e Terra E' Ancora Primavere (Heaven and Earth and Still Springtime) (in Italian). Ediz. Agemina.
- Balsamo, Anna (2003). 11 Avventure D'Anima (11 Adventures of the Soul) (in Italian). Ibiskos Ulivieri. ISBN 9788878415768.
- Balsamo, Anna (2004). Quindici Poetesse Fiorentine (Fifteen Florentine Women Poets) (in Italian). Bastogi Editrice Italiana(anthology). ISBN 9788881856046.
- Balsamo, Anna (2004). I Poeti dell'Arca (The Poets of the Arch) (in Italian). Bastogi Editrice Italiana. ISBN 88-8185-656-5.
- Balsamo, Anna (2006). Taj Mahal Passion (A Love Story in Verse) (in Italian). Ibiskos Ulivieri. ISBN 9788878412101.
- Balsamo, Anna (2011). Qui è Scalo di Spiriti della Memoria (in Italian). Ibiskos Ulivieri. ISBN 9788878416710.
- Balsamo, Anna (2014). Stanotte pazzi capricci da inseguire. Caleidoscopio. Recitativi haiku coro e voce singola per i préludes I e II volume di Claude Debussy (in Italian). Polistampa. ISBN 9788859612537.

== Awards and honors ==
- 2008 Isbiskos Books Fairs

=== Bibliography ===
- Bianchi, Giancarlo (2017). Uno sguardo dall'alto (in Italian). Novecento Poesia. ISBN 978-8894191448.
