= Gedenkdienst =

- Purpose: Holocaust remembrance
- Foundation: 1992
- Website: https://gedenkdienst.at/ www.auslandsdienst.at/en/

Gedenkdienst is a concept in Austria aimed at young people to face and take responsibility for the darkest chapters of the country's history while being financially supported by Austrian government.

Founded in Austria in 1992 by Andreas Maislinger, the Gedenkdienst is an alternative to Austria's compulsory national military service as well as a volunteering platform for Austrians to work in Holocaust and Jewish culture-related institutions around the world with governmental financial support.

The Austrian Gedenkdienst seeks to serve the remembrance of the crimes of Nazism, commemorates its victims and supports Jewish cultural future. The program is rooted in the acknowledgment of responsibility by the Austrian government for the crimes committed by the Nazis.

== History ==
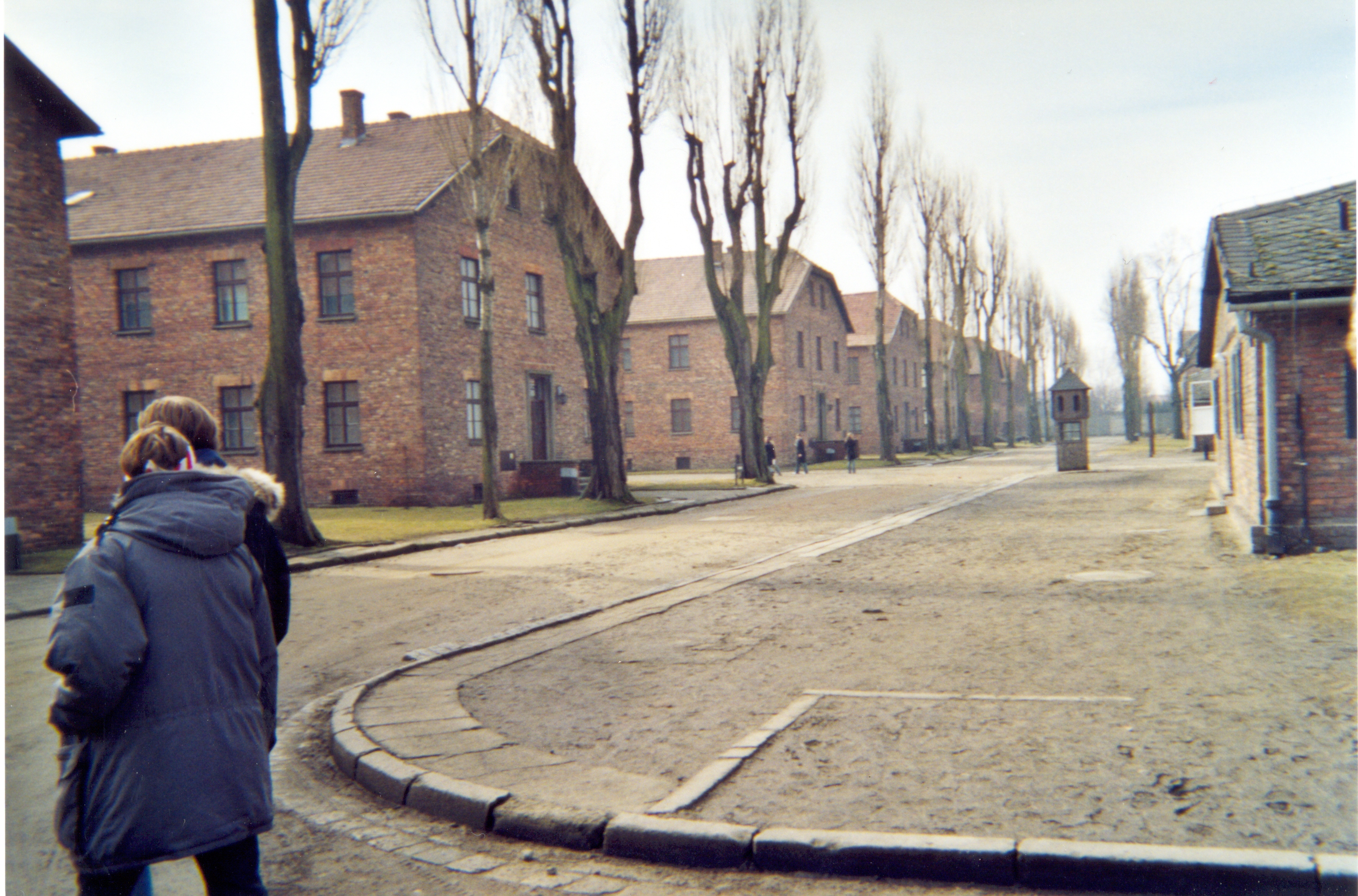
First young Austrian started in Auschwitz on September 1, 1992

=== Origin ===
The historian, political scientist and scientific director of the Braunau Contemporary History Days Andreas Maislinger promoted the idea of an alternative to the compulsory military service dedicated to the research, understanding and remembrance of the Holocaust as well as the commemoration of its victims since the late 1970s.

In 1991 Austrian chancellor Franz Vranitzky was the first chancellor of Austria to admit to and acknowledge the Austrian people's share of responsibility for the crimes committed by National Socialism during WWII. The new approach rejected the then established myth of Austria merely being the first victim of Nazism. This signaled a new approach within the Austrian political establishment regarding its stance and treatment of Austria's and Austrians' roles during the time of National Socialism.

Following these events, the Austrian government committed to funding the Gedenkdienst, with the first Austrian Holocaust Memorial Servant starting services in 1992.

=== Updates to the program after 2010 ===
After amendments to Austrian law in 2014, women or men who are not required to perform civilian service have also been able to perform memorial service and receive the same state funding since 2014. Moreover, a new amendment, which came into force in September 2023, increased the financial resources for those performing memorial service and opened up the possibility of continuing memorial service in Austria in the event of disasters such as the coronavirus pandemic. In addition, there is now a centralised record of completed memorial service.

The 2026/27 cohorts offers 10 potential one-year memorial service placements to applicants including in the Leo Baeck Institute in the U.S.A., in the Ravensbruck Memorial Site in Germany, in the Theresienstadt Initiative Institute in Czech Republic and in the Majdanek State Museum in Poland.

== Acknowledgment ==
I follow the works of the Gedenkdienst with great interest and the organization has my full support.

— Simon Wiesenthal

I often claimed there is no Austrian association which sends young people to Israel, like the German organization "Aktion Sühnezeichen". It touched me to read there is now, thanks to the possibility to perform the Austrian civilian service within the framework of the Gedenkdienst.

— Teddy Kollek

As a former Polish political prisoner of a fascist Concentration Camp and historian of World War II, I want to take the honoring opportunity to speak in front of the high house. I want to thank all the young Austrians, which work so hard for the remembrance of the past. Here I specially think of the people of the documentation archive of the Austrian resistance under the leadership of Prof. Wolfgang Neugebauer, the Austrian Camp Community Mauthausen, the Gedenkdienst, and also the local initiatives of the communities Gusen, Langenstein und St. Georgen in Oberösterreich, the working circle for homeland, memorial and history care.

— Wladyslaw Bartoszewski

I thank you for the information about the positive result from your accomplished Gedenkdienst.

— Rudolf Kirchschläger

I feel very close to this organization and I have great respect for the servants, because what they achieve is the right way for Austria – to look the past directly into the eyes and to do something against it. Not to say, we were the first victims.

— Walter Kohn

Many people have no idea what those young Austrians achieve for themselves, that they straighten up their backbones, so they can walk straight again, also myself, who belongs to this generation.

— Dietmar Schönherr

I consider the project Gedenkdienst as an important and valuable initiative in the service of peace and the peoples' communication.

— Wolfgang Schüssel

Gedenkdienst is remembrance work, which is also a bridge between "Yesterday's World" and the modern and democratic Austria. It also is a reminder that today's values like a sense of responsibility and moral courage did not lose their importance.

— Michael Spindelegger

Each Generation has to be aware of the horror of the past, to be able to build a new world of peace and respect for human rights. The project Gedenkdienst serves this important challenge of sensitizing for the meaning of the words "Never forget.

— Franz Vranitzky

== Supporting associations ==
=== Association Never Forget from 1994 to 2017 ===
The association provided positions in 19 memorial sites in Germany and Poland. The association "Never Forget" took an active part in youth work against forgetting. The association stopped operations and became defunct in 2017.

=== Austrian Service Abroad since 1998 (Österreichischer Auslandsdienst) ===
Andreas Hörtnagl and Andreas Maislinger founded the organization "Austrian Service Abroad" in 1998.

The organization is the largest in Austria and sends Auslandsdiener to six continents of the world to accomplish Holocaust commemoration work, social services and peace services. The Austrian Service Abroad is characterized by offering three types of service: the Gedenkdienst, the Austrian Social Service and the Austrian Peace Service. In May 2023, Maislinger stepped down as chairman after public criticism for alleged abuse of power.

=== The Gedenkdienst since 1992 ===
The Gedenkdienst association was founded in 1992 by Walter Guggenberger (SPÖ), Andreas Hörtnagl (ÖVP) and Andreas Maislinger (non-party) to raise awareness about the Holocaust, its causes and consequences. In 2008, female volunteers were supported for the first time by the newly created Geschwister Mezei Fund. This was set up with the aim of offering women the opportunity to perform memorial service under the same conditions as those doing alternative civilian service. This was made possible for all sponsoring organisations with the amendment to the Volunteer Act in 2014. This organisation received the Leon Zelman Prize in 2013.

In addition to its volunteer activities, the Gedenkdienst also offers events and projects in the field of historical and political education.

== Partner organizations ==
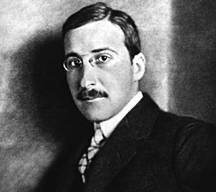
Casa Stefan Zweig

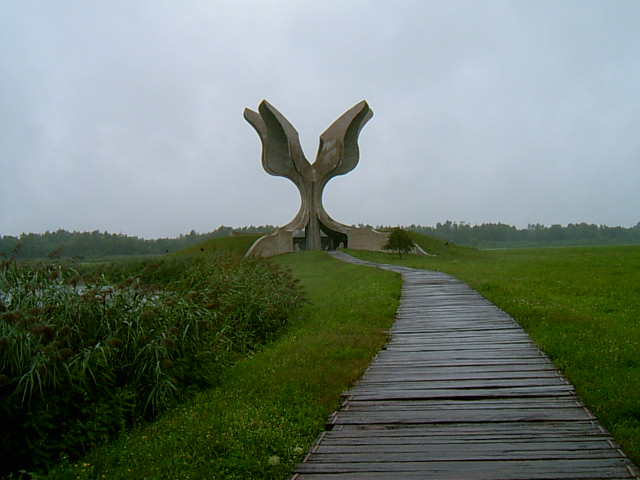
Jasenovac concentration camp

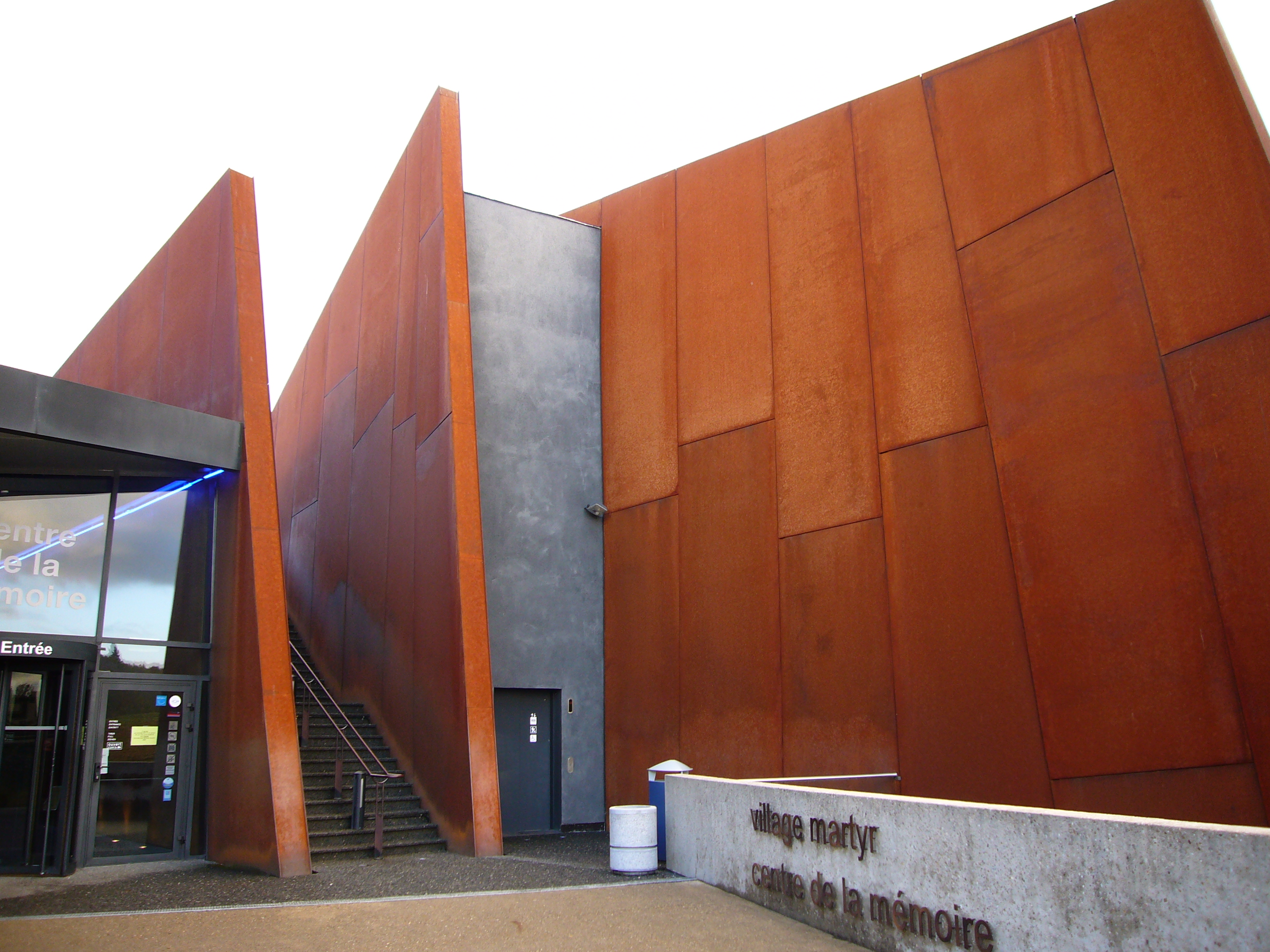
Centre de la mémoire d'Oradour

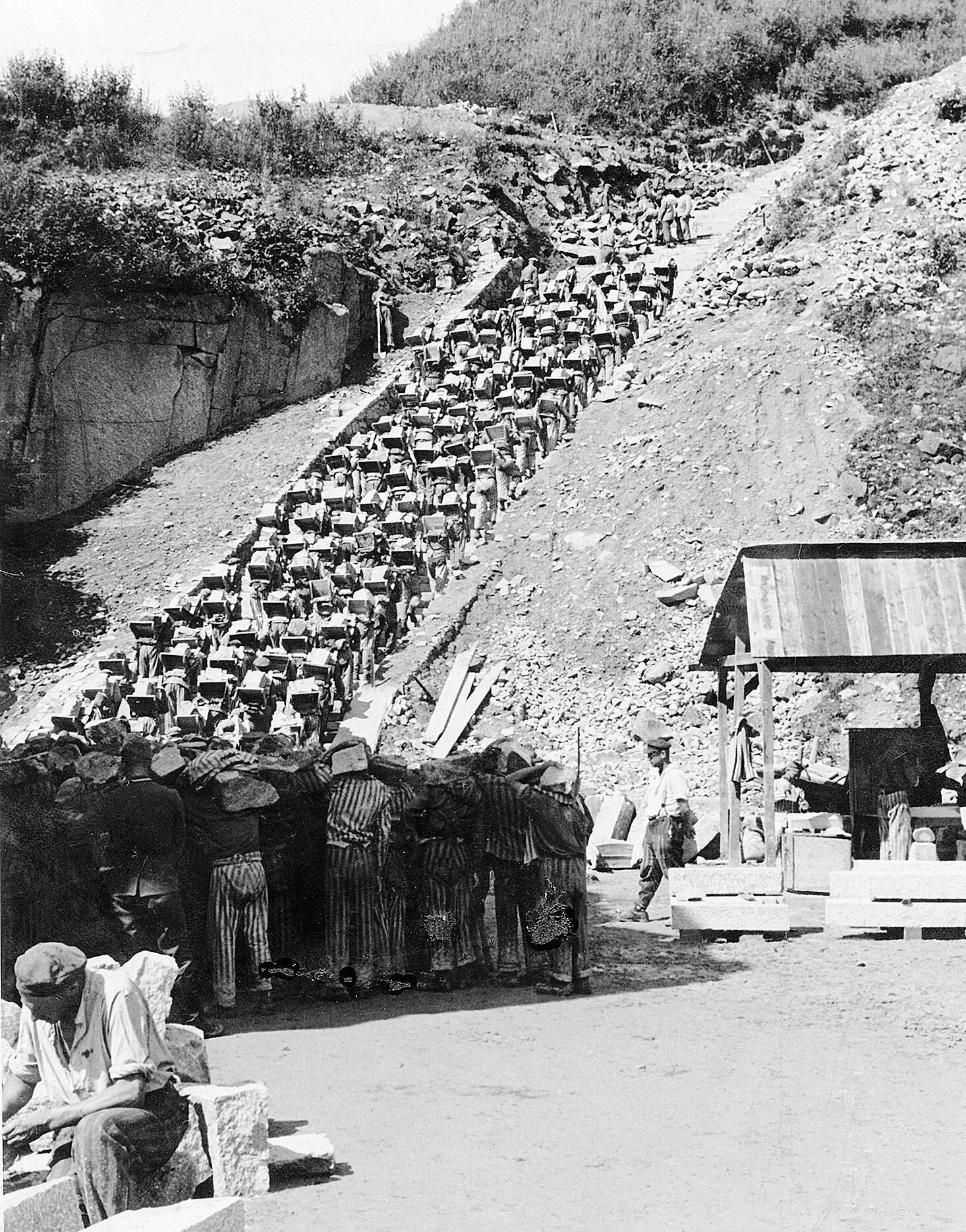
Amicale de Mauthausen

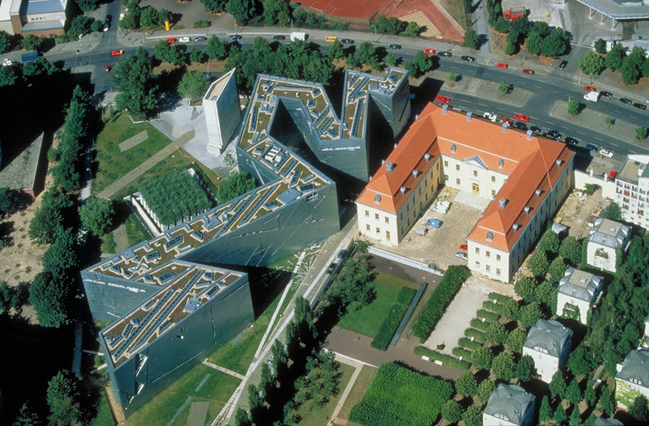
Jewish Museum Berlin

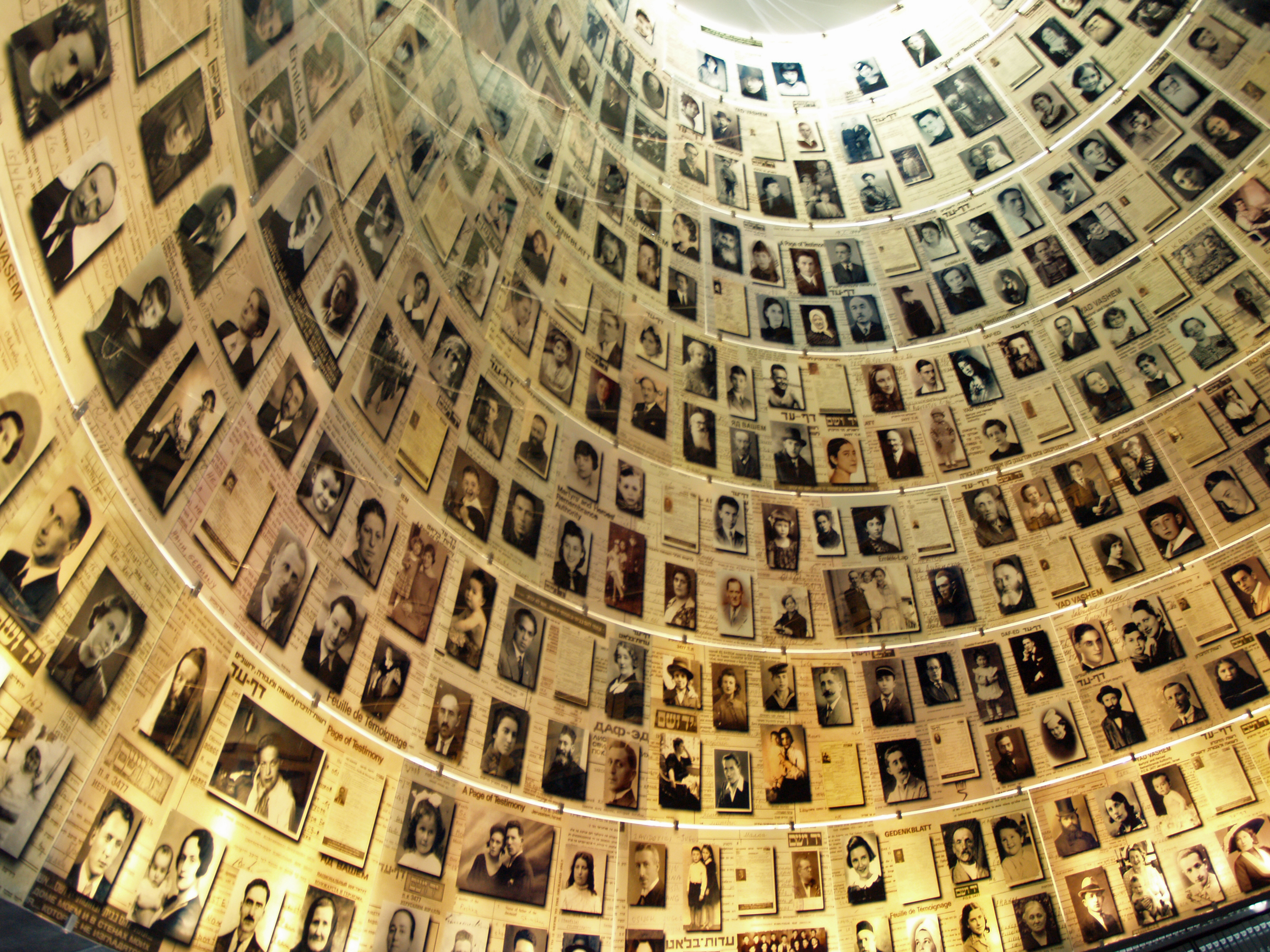
Yad Vashem in Israel

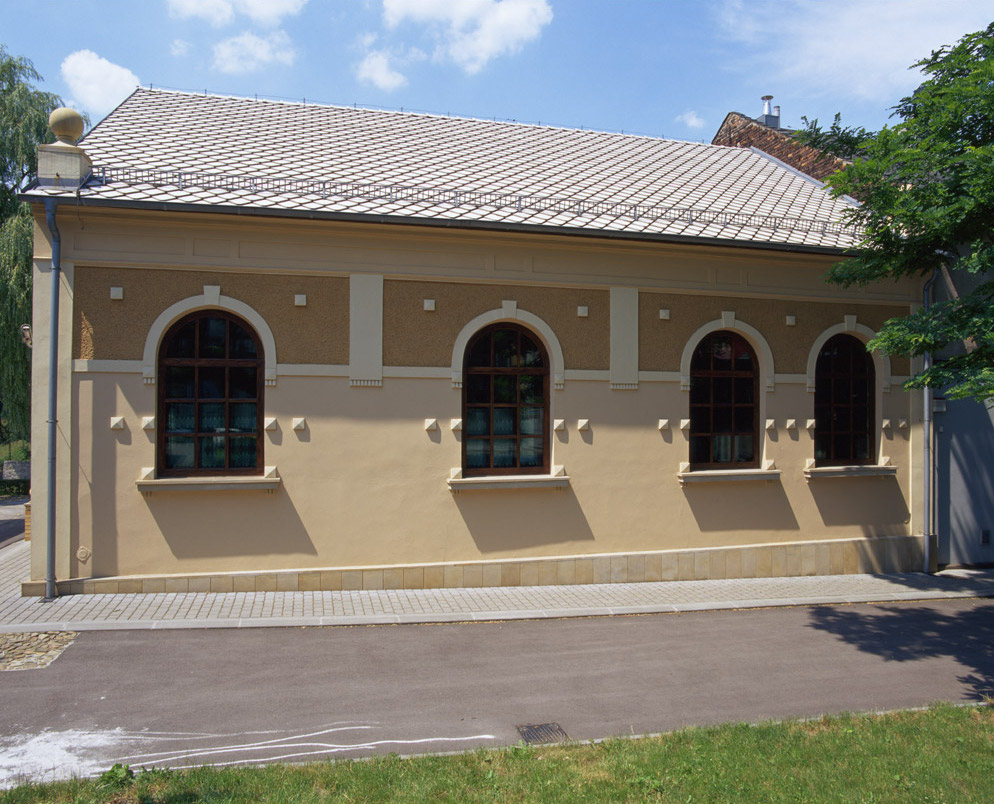
Synagogue next to Auschwitz Jewish Center

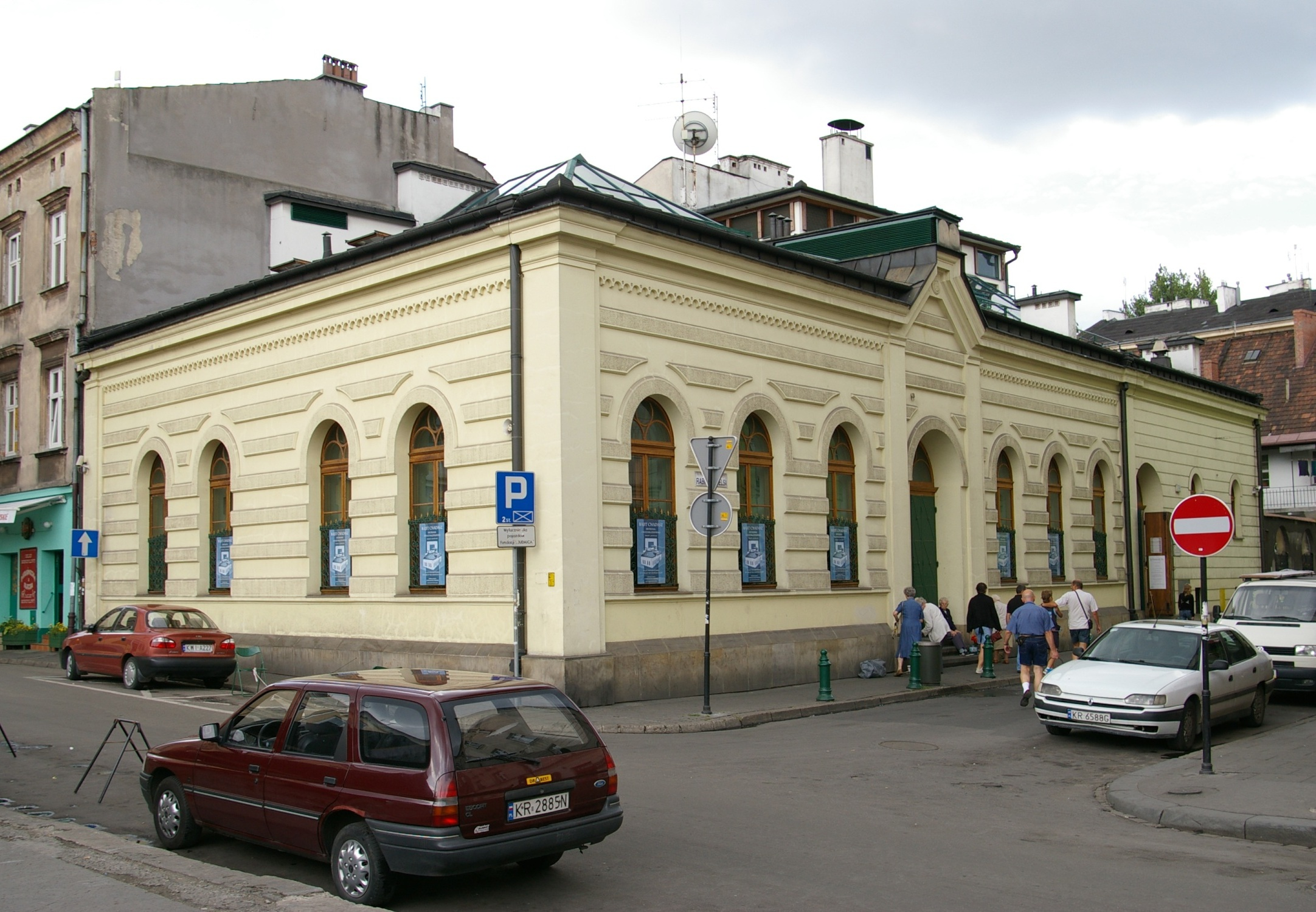
Centre For Jewish Culture in Kraków

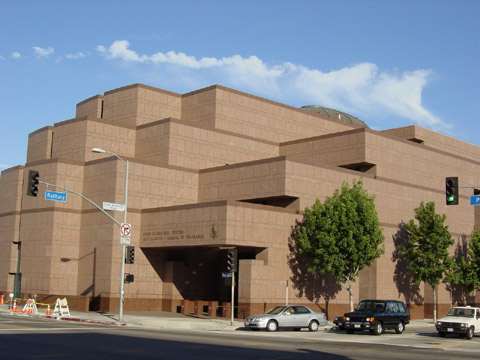
Simon Wiesenthal Center

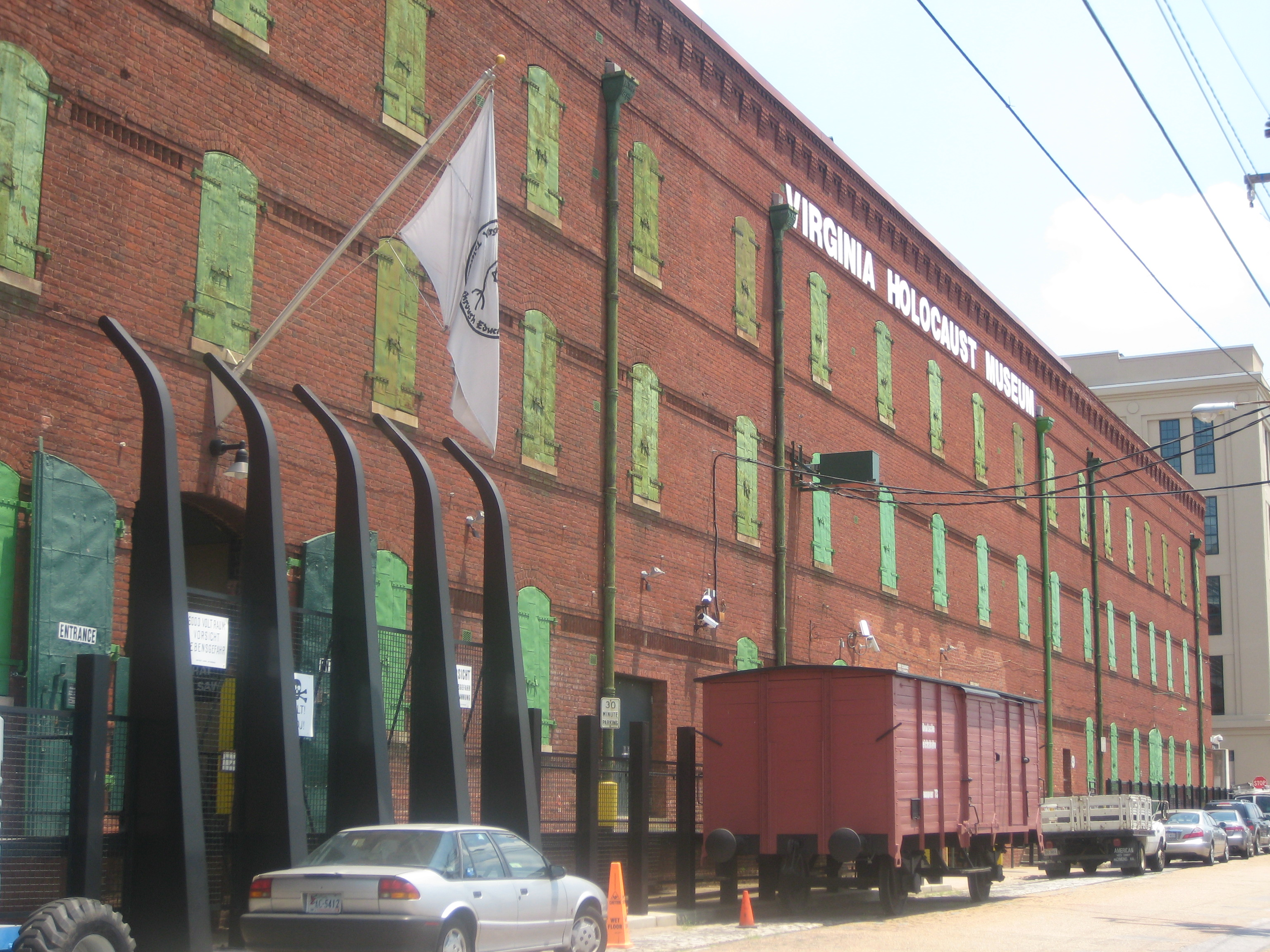
Virginia Holocaust Museum in Richmond

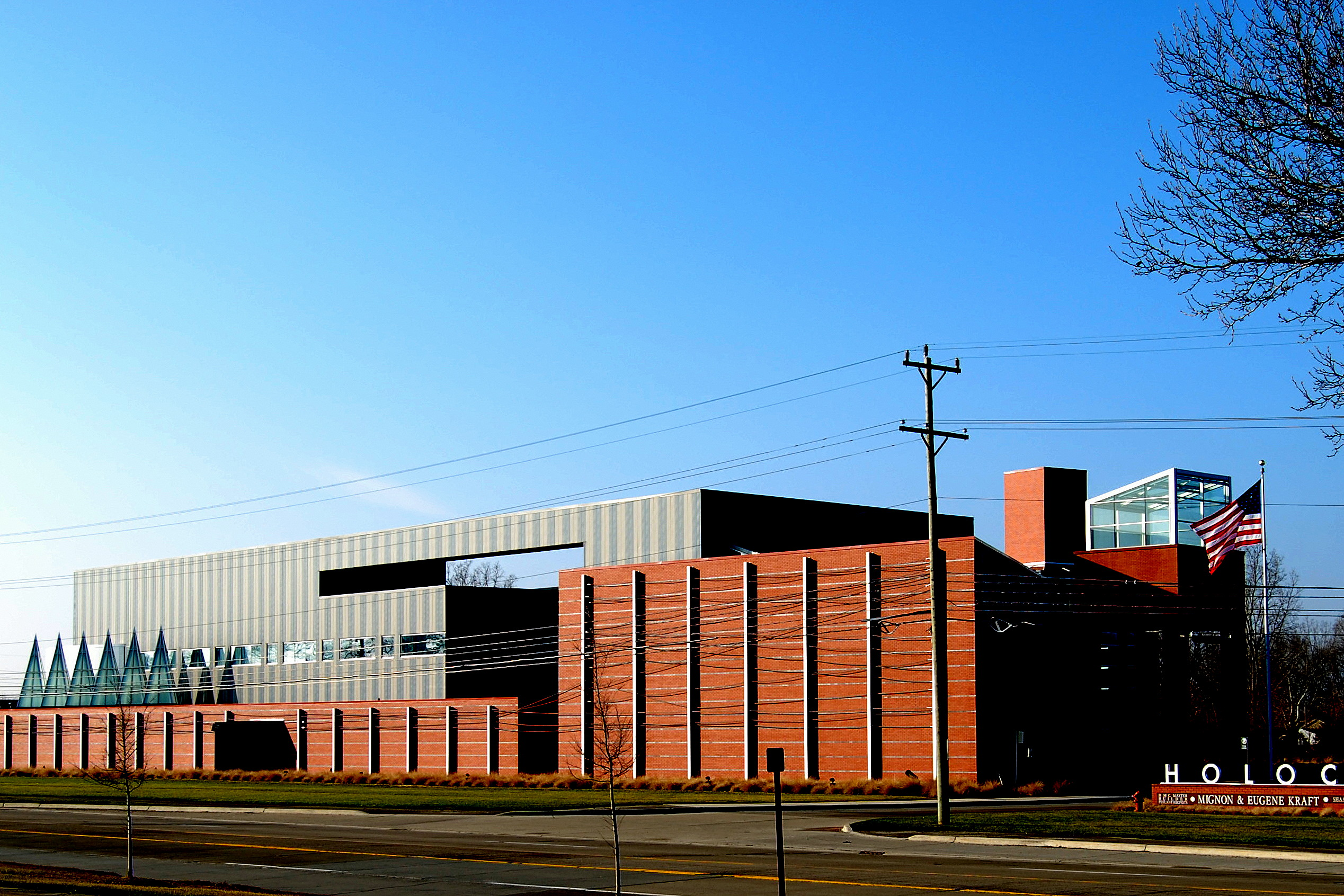
Holocaust Memorial Center in Detroit

Participants of the Gedenkdienst program can apply for one of the 18 partner organizations in the U.S., Israel and South America.

Country	City	Site
Australia	Melbourne	Jewish Holocaust Museum and Research Centre
Belgium	Brussels	CegeSoma - Centre d'Ètude Guerre et Sociéte
Belgium	Brussels	B'nai Brith International
Belgium	Brussels	European Union of Jewish Students
Brazil	São Paulo	Jewish Museum Sao Paulo
Brazil	Petrópolis	Casa Stefan Zweig
China	Shanghai	Center of Jewish Studies
Czech Republic	Prague	Institut Theresienstädter Initiative
Czech Republic	Prague	Jewish Community of Prague
Czech Republic	Terezín	Terezín Memorial - Terezin Youth Meeting Center
Germany	Augsburg	Jewish Museum Augsburg Swabia
Germany	Berchtesgaden	Institute of Contemporary History - Dokumentation Obersalzberg
Germany	Berlin	Anne Frank Zentrum
Germany	Berlin	Gedenkstätte Deutscher Widerstand
Germany	Berlin	Jewish Museum Berlin
Germany	Berlin	New Synagogue Berlin
Germany	Fürstenberg/Havel	Mahn- und Gedenkstätte Ravensbrück
Germany	Munich	Jewish Museum München
Germany	Oranienburg	Memorial and Museum Sachsenhausen
Germany	Wolfenbüttel	Lower Saxony Memorials Foundation-Wolfenbuttel Prison Memorial
Estonia	Tallinn	Vabamu Museum of Occupations and Freedom
France	Oradour-sur-Glane	Oradour Memorial Center Oradour-sur-Glane
France	Paris	Amicale de Mauthausen
France	Paris	Bibliothèque de l'Alliance Israélite Universelle
France	Paris	Fondation pour la Mémoire de la Déportation
Greece	Athens	Jewish Museum of Greece
Greece	Chania	Etz Hayyim Synagogue
Israel	Akkon	Ghetto Fighter's House Museum
Israel	Jerusalem	Leo Baeck Institut
Israel	Jerusalem	Yad Vashem
Israel	Tel Aviv	Anitta Müller-Cohen Elternheim
Israel	Tel Aviv	The Liebling Haus - White City Center
Israel	Tel Aviv	Wiener Library for the Study of the Nazi Era and the Holocaust - Elias Sourasky Central Library
Israel	Tel Aviv	Zikaron BaSalon
Italy	Milan	Centro Di Documentazione Ebraica Contemporanea
Italy	Marzabotto	Scuola Di Pace Di Monte Sole
Italy	Prato	Museo della Deportazione
Italy	Predappio	Comune di Predappio
Italy	Rome	Fondazione Museo della Shoah
Italy	Rome	Jewish Museum Rome
Italy	Trieste	Jewish Community Triest
Japan	Tokyo	Tokyo Holocaust Education Resource Center
Canada	Montreal	Holocaust Education and Genocide Prevention Foundation Montreal
Canada	Montreal	Montreal Holocaust Museum
Canada	Toronto	The Azrieli Foundation
Canada	Toronto	Toronto Holocaust Museum
Canada	Vancouver	The Vancouver Holocaust Centre
Croatia	Jasenovac	Jasenovac Memorial Site
Latvia	Riga	Museum Jews in Latvia
Latvia	Riga	Museum of the Occupation of Latvia
Latvia	Riga	Žanis Lipke Memorial
Lithuania	Vilnius	Vilna Gaon Museum of Jewish History
Belarus	Minsk	Johanes Rau Minsk International Educational Center
Mauritius	Senneville Riviere des Anguilles	Island Hebrew Congregation Senneville Riviere des Anguilles-inactive at the moment
New Zealand	Wellington	Holocaust Centre of New Zealand
Netherlands	Amsterdam	Anne Frank Stichting
Netherlands	Amsterdam	Verzetsmuseum
Netherlands	Amsterdam	Stiftung Jüdisch Historisches Museum - Jewish Cultural Quarter
Poland	Kraków	Galicia Jewish Museum
Poland	Lublin	KZ-Gedenkstätte Majdanek
Poland	Oświęcim	Auschwitz Jewish Center
Poland	Oświęcim	Museum Auschwitz-Birkenau
Poland	Warsaw	POLIN Museum of the History of Polish Jews
Portugal	Porto	Holocaust Museum of Porto
Romania	Șimleu Silvaniei	Holocaust Museum in Northern Transylvania
Russia	Moscow	Jewish Museum and Tolerance Center
Russia	Moscow	Russian Holocaust Research and Educational Center (inactive at the moment)
Serbia	Belgrade	Federation of Jewish Communities of Serbia-Jewish Historical Museum
	Belgrade	Haver Serbia
Sweden	Stockholm	Swedish Holocaust Museum
Sweden	Uppsala	The Uppsala Programme for Holocaust and Genocide Studies
Switzerland	Zurich	Hugo Mendel Foundation
	Zurich	GAMARAAL Foundation
Singapore	Singapore	The Jews of Singapore Museum
Slovenia	Ljubljana	National Museum of Contemporary History
South Africa	Durban	Durban Holocaust & Genocide Education Centre
South Africa	Cape Town	Cape Town Holocaust & Genocide Centre
South Africa	Johannesburg	Johannesburg Holocaust and Genocide Education Centre
Taiwan	Taipei	Jeffrey D. Schwartz & Na Tang Jewish Taiwan Cultural Association
Hungary	Budapest	Jewish Community Center Budapest
Hungary	Budapest	Tom Lantos Institut
United States	Dallas	Ackerman Center for Holocaust Studies
United States	Los Angeles	Los Angeles Museum of the Holocaust
United States	Los Angeles	Museum of Tolerance of the Simon Wiesenthal Center
United States	Los Angeles	USC Shoah Foundation for Visual History and Education
United States	New York	American Jewish Committee
United States	New York	Auschwitz Jewish Center Foundation (in partnership with Oswieczim in Poland)
United States	New York	Aristides de Sousa Mendes Foundation
United States	New York	Leo Baeck Institute
United States	New York	Museum of Jewish Heritage
United States	Richmond	Virginia Holocaust Museum
United States	Washington, D.C.	Capital Jewish Museum
United States	Washington, D.C.	United States Holocaust Memorial Museum
United Kingdom	London	Nightingale Hammerson - Nightingale House
United Kingdom	London	Jewish Care - Holocaust Survivors' Center
United Kingdom	London	JW3 Jewish Community Centre Holocaust Memorial Day Trust
United Kingdom	London	The Wiener Library for the Study of the Holocaust & Genocide

== See also ==
- Andreas Maislinger
- Stefan Stoev
- Austrian Peace Service
- Austrian Service Abroad
- Austrian Social Service
- House of Responsibility
- Paper Clips Project
