= Brunello (surname) =

Brunello is an Italian surname. Notable people with the surname include:

- Duilio Brunello (1925–2021), Argentine Peronist politician
- Giorgio Brunello, Italian economist
- Marina Brunello (born 1994), Italian women chess grandmaster
- Mario Brunello (born 1960), Italian cellist and musician
- Sabino Brunello (born 1989), Italian chess grandmaster
- Sereno Brunello (born 1938), Italian rower

== See also ==
- Brunelli
- Brunello (disambiguation)
