= Camilla Brunelli =

Italian historian

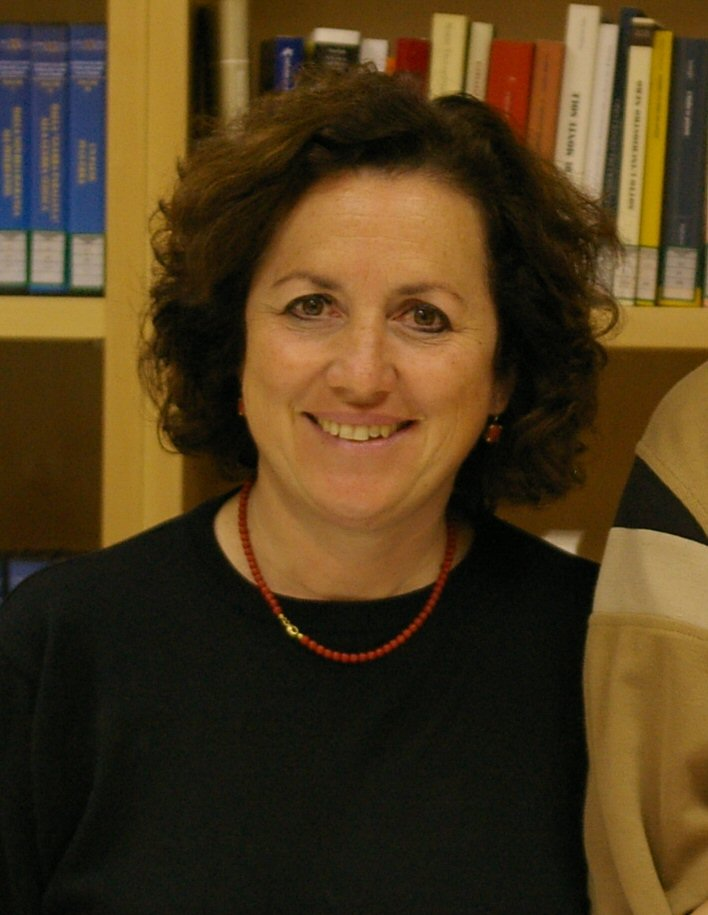
Camilla Brunelli

Camilla Brunelli (30 March 1957 in Florence) is an Italian historian and a specialist in German studies. Since 2002 she is a director of the Museo della Deportazione in the Italian city Prato.

== Life ==
As a daughter of the foreign correspondent at that time of the Italian daily paper Corriere della Sera, Brunelli moved in 1960 with her family to Bonn. After the final secondary-school examinations at the Nicolaus Cusanus High School in Bonn she studied at the University of Florenz history and German language and literature studies.

From 1988 to 1995 Brunelli worked among other things on the Austrian consulate Florenz and from 1990 to 2007 among many things such as a simultaneous interpreter for the public television RAI. Since 1984 she is active in addition for Prato and the Austrian municipality even lake in the common partnership between cities. In addition she co-operated several times with in Berlin the residents foundation topography of the terror.

Since 2002 Brunelli is a director of the Museo della Deportazione in the Tuscan city Prato. She is an expert in the context of the European memory culture. In 2009 she was selected as a representative of Italy in the international advice of the association Austrian foreign service.

== Translations into the Italian (selection) ==
- E. Kendler, R. Pekar: May più! (Never again!). City Prato and province Florenz, Prato 1987
- Mark Lidzbarski: Ricordi di giovinezza di un professore tedesco (on rough way. Youth memories of a German professor). Passigli Editore, Florenz 1988 (with Lela husband ski)
- Grete Weil: IL prezzo della sposa (the bride price). Giunti, Florenz 1991
- Curt Goetz: Una strega A Beverly Hills (the dead one of Beverly Hills). Giunti, Florenz 1995

== Translations into German (selection) ==
- Guido Baglioni: Ist Demokratie moeglich? (Democrazia impossibile?). Nomos, Baden-Baden 1998

== Publication ==
- Grete Weil: Conseguenze tardive (late sequences), La Giuntina, Florenz 2008
- Cooperation on: Il libro dei deportati, given change of Brunello Mantelli and Nicola Tranfaglia, Mursia, Milan 2009

== Filmography (selection) ==
- Cooperation at the film: Un futuro by la memoria (A Future for the Memory) of Massimo Sani, Prato 1997
- Participation in the film script too: Luci nel buio (Lights in the Darkness) of Gabriele Cecconi, Prato 2003
