= Centro d'Arte Modigliani =

Arte center in Italy

Modigliani Art Center (Centro d'Arte Modigliani) is an art center founded in 1979 based in Scandicci, a suburb of Florence, Italy in Tuscany. The cultural center develops visual arts and literature via shows and conferences about renowned artists, poets and writers. It also develops artists, poets and writers whose work is less well known or debuting publicly. The center is named in honor of Amedeo Modigliani, an Italian modernist painter who lived and worked mostly in France.

== Membership ==
The membership is approximately 100 poets, painters and authors as well as cultural advocates and sympathizers. Most of the membership is residents of Florence, Scandicci and other Tuscan towns, with some from other Italian regions and some foreign international members.

Some of the artists contribute to events and hold elections to nominate honorary members of various fields based on their talent and cultural development of our activities.

== Artistic alliances ==
Modigliani Art Center conducts artistic and cultural activities. It sometimes program events with outside collaboration that involves the works by artists, poets and writers who are not also members of the art association. The center's international artistic and cultural collaborations for over 30 years have been involved with the cities of Paris, Moscow and London. Some of these activities are organized to support the values of human cultural solidarity and Peace.

The Center is active in reviving the custom of twinning between the cities. They received an invitation from French artists and the "Twinning Council" of Pantin (Paris), France and inaugurated their XXXIV Year Salon of Painting with the Pantin art association "Les Amis des Arts" (Friends of Art).

== Events ==
The Modigliani Art Center organizes several artistic and cultural activities yearly. The events are exhibitions and reviews of contemporary fine art, poetry readings, and conference presentations of books including poetry, essays, and novels. A lecture series offers debate and discussion on literary themes, contemporary history, art criticism and art history.

These activities are predominantly organized in Scandicci, Florence and in other Tuscan towns, but have been held in other Italian regions as well as internationally.

Centro d'Arte Modigliani organized 65 cultural events in 2010, and 50 events in 2011.

== Staff ==
Roberto Cellini is the president, curator and creative director of the Modigliani Art Center. Among noted poets on its board of directors are Duccia Camiciotti, Roberta Degl’Innocenti and Caterina Trombetti. The British composer and artist Simon Rackham (who has exhibited work through the Modigliani association), has dedicated pieces to Roberto Cellini and Caterina Trombetti on the albums 'Dedications' and 'Once in a Blue Moonlight'.
