= Carmelina Rotundo =

Italian journalist, blogger and teacher (born 1953)

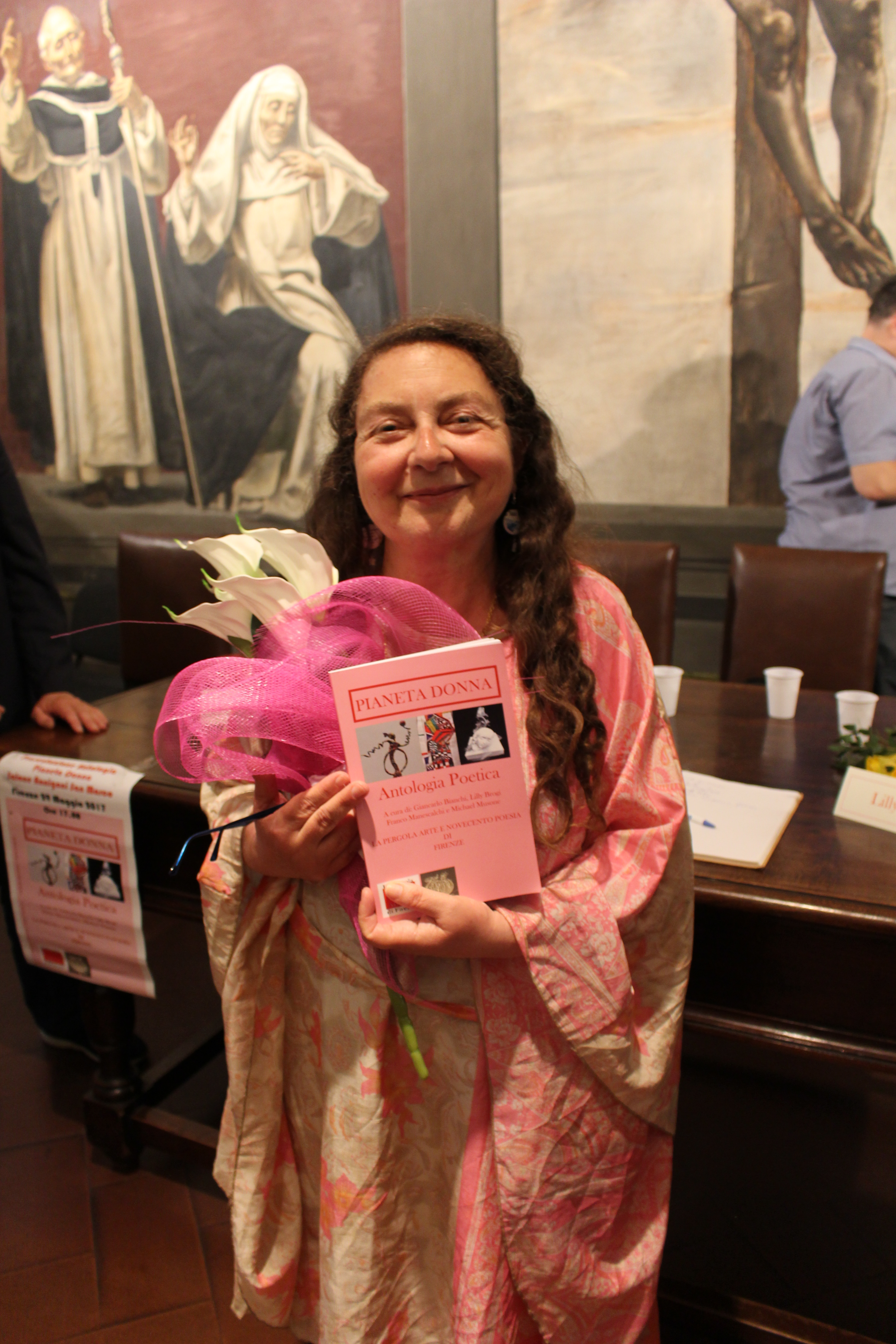
- Carmelina Rotundo presentazione Pianeta Donna
- Born: Carmelina Rotundo; 24 November 1953 (age 72); Orbetello, Italy
- Occupation: Journalist

Carmelina Rotundo (born 24 November 1953 in Orbetello) is an Italian journalist, blogger and teacher.

== Career ==
Carmelina was an Italian teacher at primary school, a tutor at university (Scienze della Formazione Primaria in Florence), a journalist and a blogger.

Rotundo is the Director in charge of the magazines Aghi di Pino, Art- Art and Accademia di Livorno. She is a collaborator for newspapers such as Toscana Oggi and La Nazione of Florence. With the municipality of Impruneta she organized exhibitions of contemporary art and collaborated with the associations Fondazione Il Fiore, La Pergola Arte, the Galleria Centro Storico, and Misericordia di Firenze for the same purpose.

On the web, she collaborated with LeMeridie. it Overthesky, and La Terrazza di Michelangelo.

In 2008, she participated in City Lights, a photographic exhibition by Francesco De Masi, texts by Carmelina Rotundo, jewels by Ugo Bellini, Paolo Venturini and Gianni Testi in Florence - Museo Diocesano di Arte Sacra di Santo Stefano al Ponte (Spazio Incontri di Arte Contemporanea).

In 2010, Rotundo made friends with poet Vanna Bonta at the Camerata dei poeti of Florence. She befriended other poets and artists around the world: Giancarlo Bianchi, Lilly Brogi, Amalia Ciardi Dupree, Duccia Camiciotti, Anna Balsamo and Jakline Nakash De Blanck.

In 2014, she presented a sculpture at the Officina del profumo farmaceutica di Santa Maria Novella "Non abbiamo altre strade che quella dell'amore" made by artist Giuseppe Tocchetti.

In 2016, she was one of the speakers of the exhibition Arteè at the Consiglio regionale della Toscana at the Palazzo del Pegaso.

In 2017, she presented the anthology "Pianeta Donna" with Lilly Brogi, Giancarlo Bianchi e Franco Manescalchi at the salone Annigoni in the basilica di San Marco of Florence.

In 2018, she organized the group exhibition Oceani d'amore at palazzo del Pegaso seat of Consiglio regionale della Toscana.

In 2021, she accepted the position of President of the Art Culture Poetry Commission of the Associazione Orizzonte Comune, formerly known as the Istituto Culturale Sole e Luna, which she still holds today, also conducting radio broadcasts for the Kappa Radio web radio managed by the Association.

== Published works ==
- Rotundo, Carmelina (1978). A tutti coloro….. Io dedico (in Italian). Cultura Editrice.
- Rotundo, Carmelina (1981). Permette una poesia (in Italian).
- Rotundo, Carmelina (1983). Magisano (in Italian). Libraria Australia.
- Rotundo, Carmelina (1991). Che favola! (in Italian). Cultura Editrice.

=== Poetry anthologies ===
- Suicide Love Killer (in Italian). Youcanprint. 2010. ISBN 9788896838419.
- Pianeta Donna (in Italian). Youcanprint. 2017. ISBN 9788892666313.

=== Stories books ===
- Esercizi di memoria (in Italian). Arci Isolotto. 2001.

==== Bibliography ====
- Bianchi, Giancarlo (2017). Uno sguardo dall'alto (in Italian). Novecento Poesia. ISBN 978-8894191448.
