= Brunelleschi (disambiguation) =

Filippo Brunelleschi (1377-1446) was one of the foremost architects and engineers of the Italian Renaissance.

Brunelleschi may also refer to:

- 6055 Brunelleschi (2158 T-3), a Main-belt Asteroid discovered in 1977
- Brunelleschi (crater), a crater on Mercury named for the architect

== Other people with the surname ==
- Umberto Brunelleschi (1879-1949), an Italian artist

== See also ==
- Brunelleschi's Dome, part of the Florence Cathedral
- Brunello (disambiguation)
