= Casa Stefan Zweig =

Museum in Brazil

Coordinates: 22°31′14″S 43°11′19″W

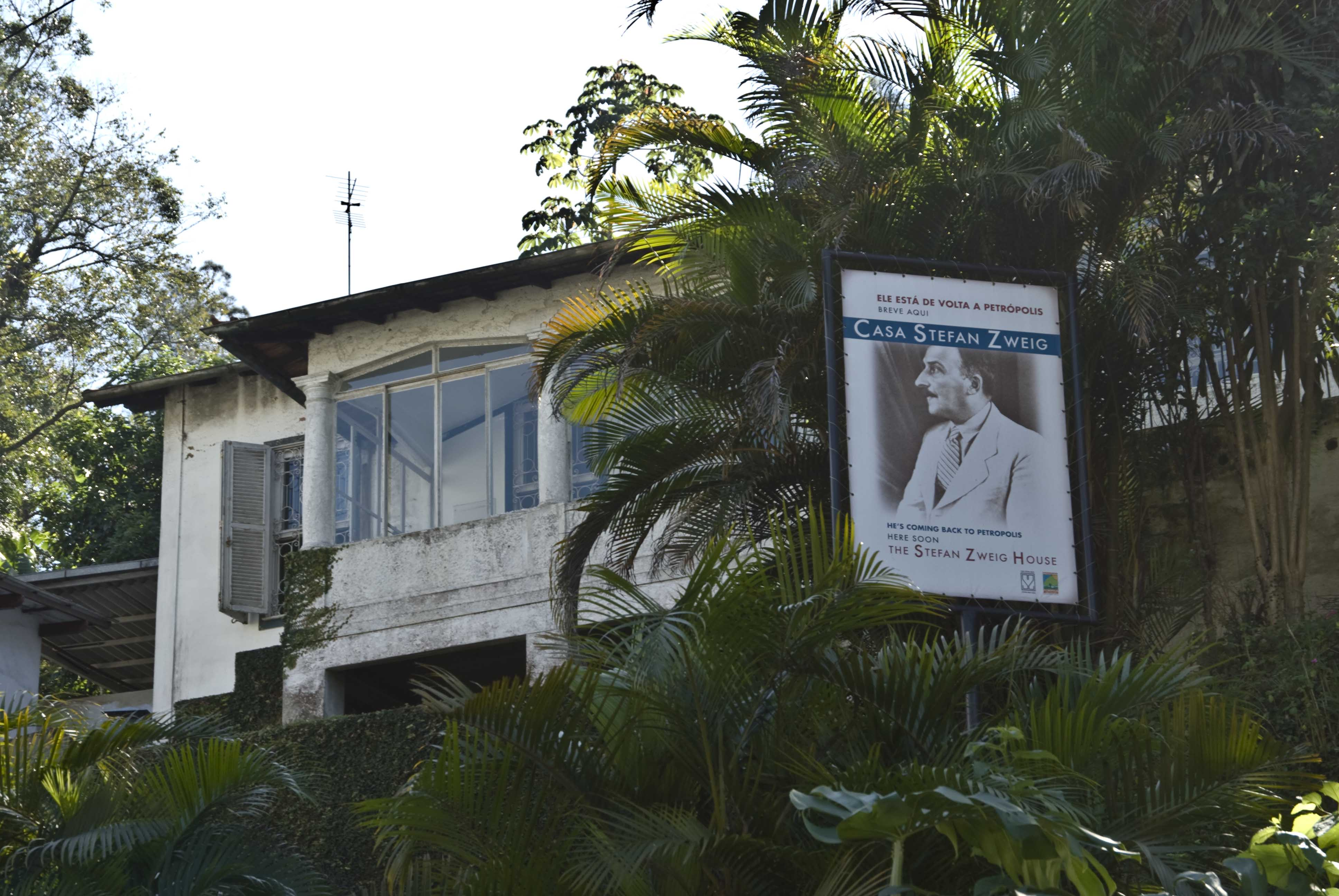
Casa Stefan Zweig in Petrópolis

Casa Stefan Zweig is a writer's house museum in the residence of Stefan Zweig and his wife in Petrópolis (Brazil). It was founded in 2006.

== Background ==
The house, in which Stefan Zweig and his second wife Lotte resided for 5 months until their joint suicide in February 1942 and where the author had revised his autobiography Die Welt von Gestern and drafted Schachnovelle and his essays about Montaigne, was bought by the association "Casa Stefan Zweig" and the architect Miguel Pinto Guimarães was commissioned with the renovation and the redesign of the house into a museum.

Zweig like other artists, scholars, and scientists from Europe had fled to Brazil, due to the Nazi Party takeover in Germany, then Austria. Having lost his Austrian citizenship due to his ethnicity, Zweig first fled to England. However, after the United Kingdom entered the war, even Jewish Austrians were considered enemy citizens, and Zweig fled again to the New World. Zweig was passionate about the hope of Brazil, having written de:Brasilien. Ein Land der Zukunft (pt:Brasil, País do Futuro, Brazil, Land of the Future).

The museum is dedicated to the author.

== Plans for the library ==
The museum accommodates a library as well as a conference hall. Along with exhibitions, conferences, competitions, theater and cinema performances, readings and concerts, cooperations with partner organisations like the Internationale Stefan Zweig Gesellschaft, have also been planned.

Scientists as well as the general public should have the opportunity, to retrieve online information about Zweig, his work and his literature written in exile. They should furthermore have the opportunity to contribute their own ideas. For this purpose, a bilingual web page will be created by the Casa Stefan Zweig, which will be updated constantly.

The First president of the association Casa Stefan Zweig is the Brazilian journalist and Stefan Zweig biographer, Alberto Dines.

He was honored for his work and was awarded the Austrian Holocaust Memorial Award (AHMA) which was founded/established by the Austrian Service Abroad in 2006.

Since February 2008 the first Austrian Holocaust Memorial Servant has served within the framework of the Austrian Holocaust Memorial Service at the association Casa Stefan Zweig.
