= Brunello =

Brunello may refer to:

- Brunello, Lombardy, a municipality in Italy
- Brunello (character), a fictional dwarf in the romantic epics Orlando innamorato and Orlando furioso
- Brunello Cucinelli (brand), an Italian luxury fashion brand
- Brunello di Montalcino, a wine from Tuscany
- Brunello (grape), the name used near Montalcino for a Sangiovese clone
- Brunellopoli, a scandal involving producers of the wine, also known as Brunellogate

== People ==
- Brunello (given name), given name
- Brunello (surname), surname

== See also ==
- Brunelli
- Brunelleschi (disambiguation)
