= Stefan Stoev =

Bulgarian-Austrian entrepreneur (born 1977)

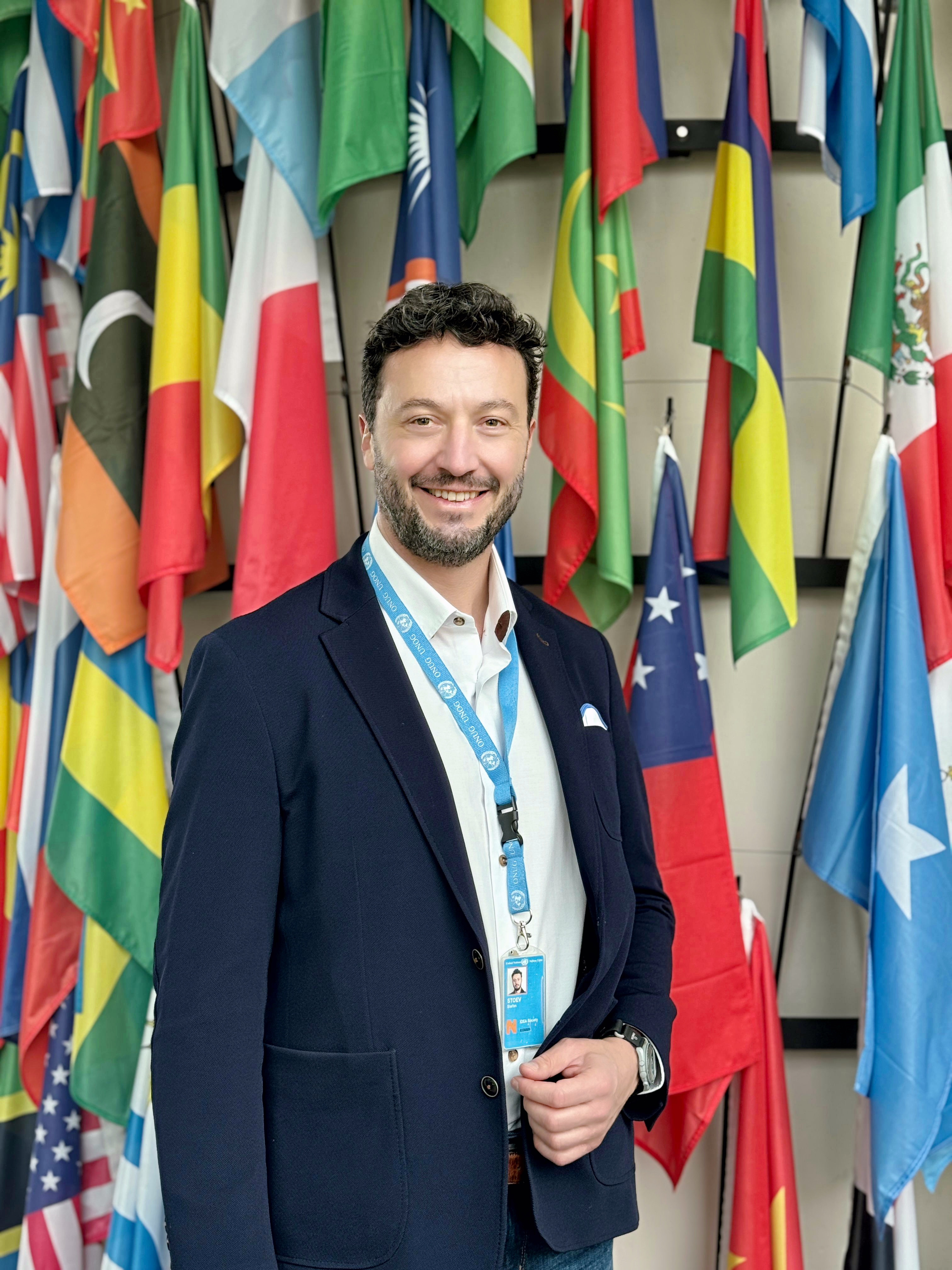
- Dr. Stefan Stoev at UN ECOSOC in Vienna, 2026
- Born: 1977 (age 48–49); Sofia, Bulgaria
- Occupations: Entrepreneur, philanthropist
- Known for: Supporter of the arts, peace advocate

Stefan Stoev (born 1977 in Sofia) is an Austrian entrepreneur, philanthropist, supporter of the arts, author and peace advocate.

As entrepreneur Stoev is the co-founder and CEO of the Austrian mining company MINEX and Angel Investor in Green-Tech.

== Education ==
Stoev has a PhD Degree in information technology and economics, a master's degree in international finance and economics, a bachelor's degree in international economic affairs, and a Professional Degree in foreign affairs and linguistics.

== Life and philanthropy ==
Between 2004 and 2005, Stoev served as Austrian Gedenkdienst representative at the Holocaust Memorial Museum in Washington, D.C. During this time he was engaged in scientific research at the Center for Advanced and Holocaust Studies, maintained contact to Holocaust Survivors. During his service he wrote Zeitbrücke: Generationskontakte, Geschichtseinblicke, Freundschaften, a German-language book based on his work at the museum, which was published in November 2026..

Upon his return to Austria he founded the cultural organization IDEA Society (Society for International Development and Enhancement of Arts). Stoev engaged in Cultural and Art Diplomacy, and promotes the intercultural dialogue by supporting Austrian and international artists worldwide.

In 2008 he initiated the international Art project Pangaea in support of UNICEF. The outcome of this project was the creation of the art collection for World Peace, which since then is on travel exhibitions on all continents. Stoev established cooperations with peace museums and international topic related organizations. Followed by annual events as artistic tribute to the International Day of Peace and numerous lectures from Stoev on conferences at the United Nations and at the European Parliament.

In 2011 Stoev was nominated as Ambassador for Peace from the Universal Peace Federation. For his contribution to the promotion of arts and culture Stoev was honored in 2012 with the award of the Bulgarian Ministry of Culture.

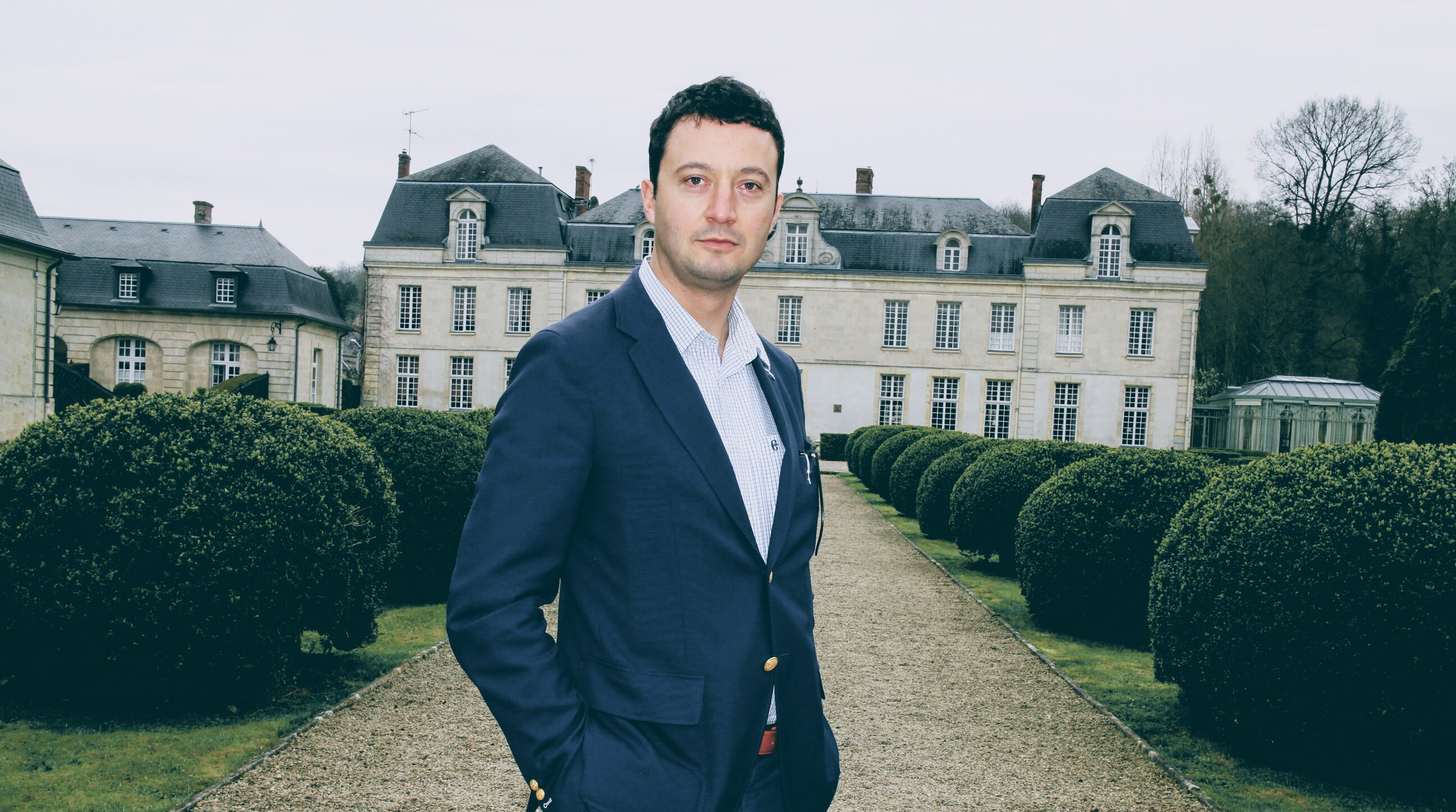
Stefan Stoev in 2017

Among others Stoev realized the EU funded project of Culture and Arts between Austria and Turkey. Also in 2012 he participated as juror at the International Art for Peace Contest for Young People from the United Nations Office for Disarmament Affairs and the Harmony for Peace Foundation. for Harmonization In the same year Stoev organized in Vienna an exhibition for the sculptor and diplomat Gabriela von Habsburg on Art Diplomacy between the Danube and the Black Sea. In cooperation with the Academic Council of the United Nations System (ACUNS) in Vienna, the Universal Peace Federation (UPF) and the Austro-Brazilian NGO ABRASA, Stoev organized with the IDEA Society at the Vienna International Centre (VIC) the conference on "Culture as a Basic Element for Sustainable Development and Human Rights".

Stoev helped for the successful theatre premiere of William Shakespeare's of the American Drama Group in Vienna and is since then regular supporter of the annual international event at the Stadtpalais Liechtenstein.

In 2013 Stoev organized an international exhibition on Humanity, with art works of Manfred Bockelmann and Pangaea, moderated by Danielle Spera. Stoev applied on behalf of the IDEA Society the NGO Special Consultative Status with the ECOSOC of the United Nations Economic and Social Council (ECOSOC), which was granted in 2014 upon the decision of the Committee on NGOs in New York City.

In 2021 Stoev was appointed as European Climate Pact Ambassador in Austria to the European Commission, European Union.

=== Writing ===
Twenty years after the original Zeitbrücke project, Stoev co-edited with Josef Mühlbauer of the University of Graz and Hannes Swoboda of the International Institute for Peace the volume Time Bridge: Peace and Cross-Cultural Dialogue, published open access by Graz University Library Publishing in October 2026. The book examines the structures and practices that make peace possible, with contributions on cooperative security, the European Union as a peace project, cultural diplomacy and intercultural dialogue, as well as case studies ranging from peacebuilding in the northern Beqaa Valley to colonial legacies and religious pluralism. It opens with Stoev's preface, "Zeitbrücke after 20 Years: Returning to Washington".

Also in 2026, Stoev published The Unworshipped Engine: Why Humans Worship Gold and Ignore What Actually Keeps Them Alive, a non-fiction book on the economics and psychology of resource value. The book traces the human drive to accumulate and display wealth from evolutionary biology through economic history, including mining, colonialism and modern resource competition. It argues that this instinct is permanent and proposes building institutions that redirect it toward what sustains life. The book is held by the Austrian National Library.

== Publications ==
- Women of Society Lea Fuchs and Ljubomir Dimov 2015 ISBN 978-3-9503577-0-7
- Любомир Димов – Българският майстор на цветовете и пъстрите мотиви придобил международно признание, Black&White Magazine, 10.10.2014
- Bringing Cultures Together Through the Arts to Facilitate Cultural Diplomacy in the Context of the European Project, International Conference on Cultural Diplomacy in the EU, Brüssel, 2011
- Zeitbrücke - Generationskontakte, Geschichtseinblicke, Freundschaften, 2005
- "I wanted to be sent to Europe to participate in the struggle against the Nazis." A Conversation with German Survivor Gerald Schwab, Jewish News, 4.01.2007

== Selected works ==
- Zeitbrücke: Generationskontakte, Geschichtseinblicke, Freundschaften. 2026 (written 2004–2005). ISBN 9798141864858.
- (co-editor, with Josef Mühlbauer and Hannes Swoboda) Time Bridge: Peace and Cross-Cultural Dialogue. Graz: Graz University Library Publishing, 2026. ISBN 978-3-903374-67-6. doi:10.25364/978-3-903374-67-6.
- The Unworshipped Engine: Why Humans Worship Gold and Ignore What Actually Keeps Them Alive. 2026. ISBN 9798193876595.
