= Carmelina Delfin =

Cuban composer and pianist

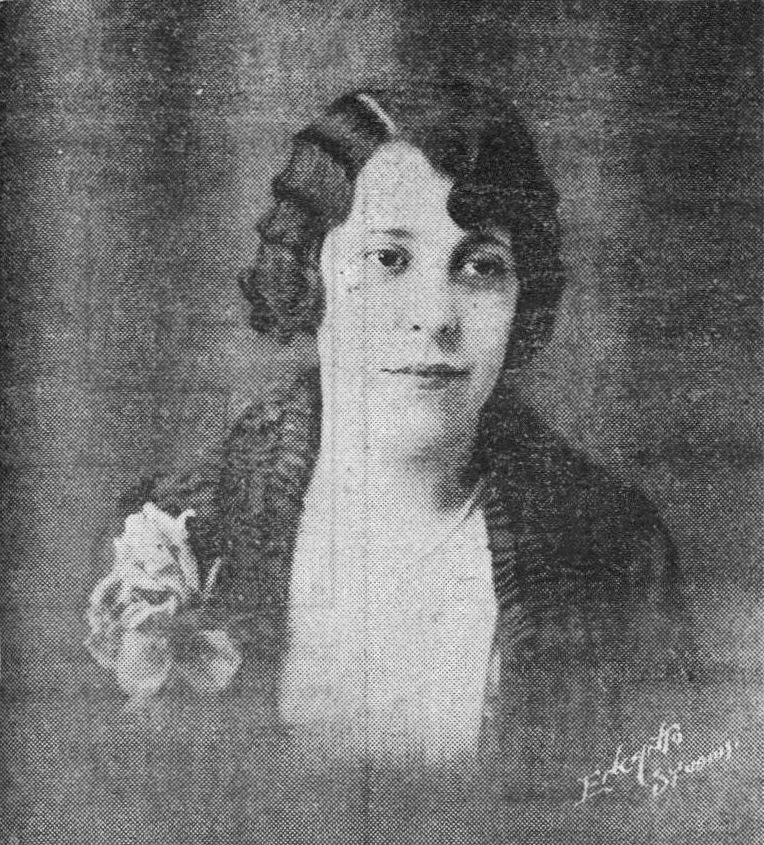

Carmelina Delfín (died after 1948) was a Cuban composer and pianist. Delfín was born in Havana and in the 1920s performed as a soloist with Ernesto Lecuona in his Ernesto Lecuona Symphonic Orchestra. She played at the 1943 Cuban Liberation Day concert at Carnegie Hall and at numerous other concerts, often performing her own works.

== Works ==
Delfín wrote piano works and lyric-romantic songs including:

- Al recordar tu nombre
- 12 Composiciones
