= Carmelina Soto =

Colombian poet (1916–1994)

- Born: 1916; Armenia, Quindío
- Died: 1994 (aged 77–78)
- Occupation: Poet
- Writing career
- Notable works: Bells of Dawn, October and Motionless Time

Carmelina Soto Valencia (1916–1994) was a Colombian poet, born in Armenia, Quindío. Some of her well-known works include Bells of Dawn, October and Motionless Time.

== Books ==
- (1941) Campanas del alba
- (1953) Octubre
- (1974) Tiempo inmóvil: Selección Poética.
- (1983) Tiempo inmóvil: Selección Poética. 2ª edición.
- (1983) Un centauro llamado Bolívar.
- (1997) Canción para iniciar un olvido
- (2007) La casa entre la niebla
