= Carmelina Cruz Silva =

Mexican politician

- Born: Oaxaca, Mexico
- Occupation: Politician
- Political party: PRI

Isabel Carmelina Cruz Silva is a Mexican politician affiliated with the Institutional Revolutionary Party. As of 2014 she served as Deputy of the LIX Legislature of the Mexican Congress representing Oaxaca as replacement of Elpidio Concha.
