= Museo della Deportazione =

Museum in Prato, Italy

Coordinates: 43°55′21.91″N 11°05′35.31″E

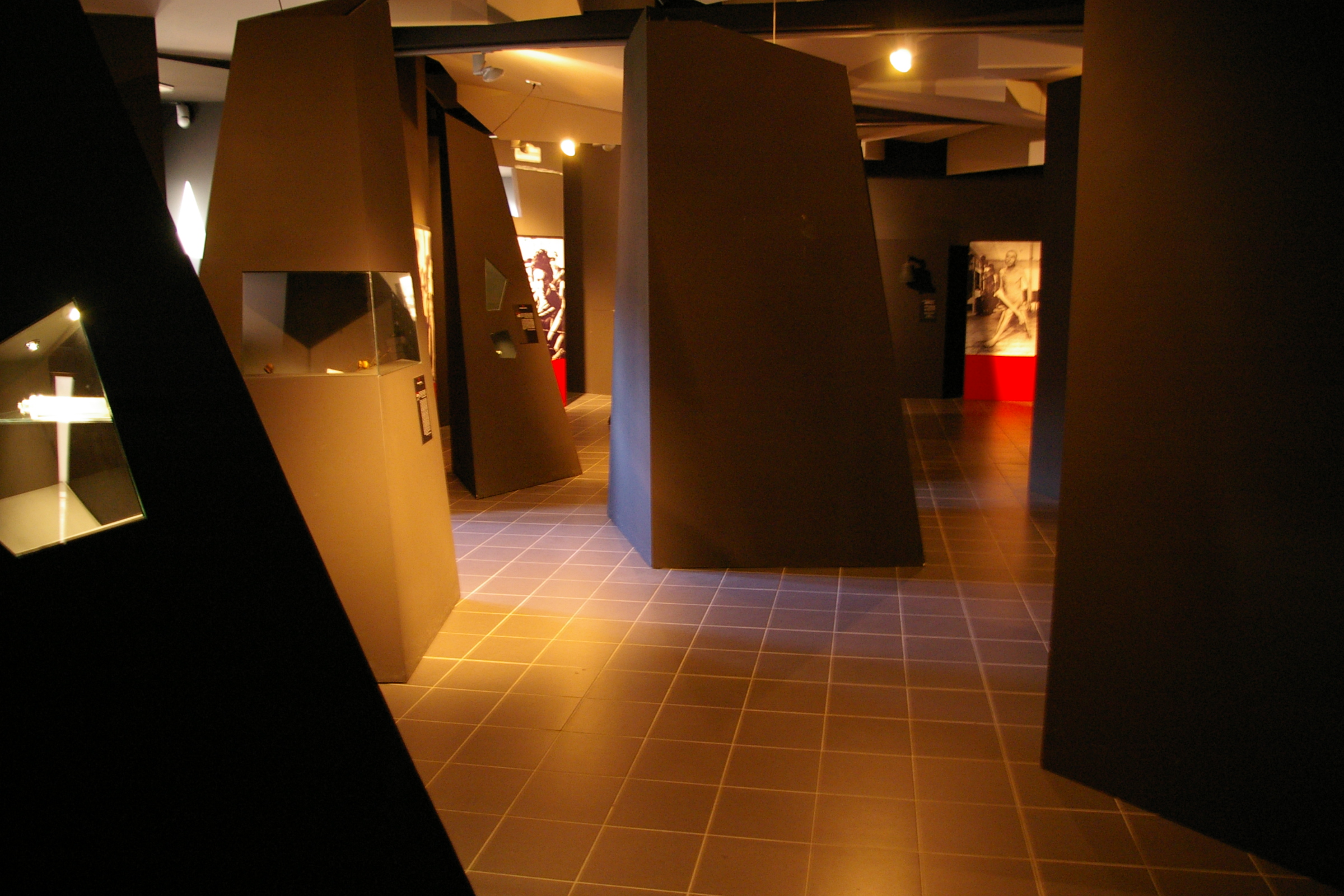
Museo della Deportazione e Resistenza (Deportation and Resistance Museum) in Prato

The Museo e Centro di Documentazione della Deportazione e Resistenza ("Museum and Centre of Documentation of Deportation and Italian Resistance") is a museum in Prato, central Italy, dedicated to the history of Fascism's occurrence and rise to power in Italy. The director of the foundation is Camilla Brunelli.

It records the political, racial, and religious persecution and deportation of people in concentration and extermination camps and with resistance during World War II.

== History ==
The institution is located in Figline di Prato, where on 6 September 1944, 29 partisans were killed by German armed Forces. It was one of hundreds of mass murders committed by German troops in the Tuscany Region.

Today's museum and documentation centre are only a stone's throw away from the site of the massacre.

However, the content of the exhibition is marked by another historical event: In March 1944, following a general strike in occupied northern and central Italy, hundreds of Tuscans and over one hundred Prateser were deported to the Mauthausen concentration camp and the majority then further to the Ebensee neighbouring camp.

When choosing the location of the museum, a factory hall in the centre of the city was therefore also in consideration. In the end, however, Figline was chosen as an "authentic site of a Nazi massacre".

The initiative to build a museum in memory of the events of that time came from a few survivors in Prates, including Roberto Castellani. The financing was provided by the municipality of Prato and the museum and the documentation centre were opened on 10 April 2002 in a solemn ceremony attended by the then Italian President Carlo Azeglio Ciampi.

Initially under the administration of the Municipality, since February 2008 it has been a foundation created by the Municipalities of the Province of Prato, the ANED (National Association of Former Political Deportees in Nazi Camps), the Associazione Nazionale Partigiani d'Italia (National Association of Italian Partisans) and the Jewish Community of Florence.

Since 2008, the museum has also been the place of action for the Austrian Memorial Service.

== Exhibition ==
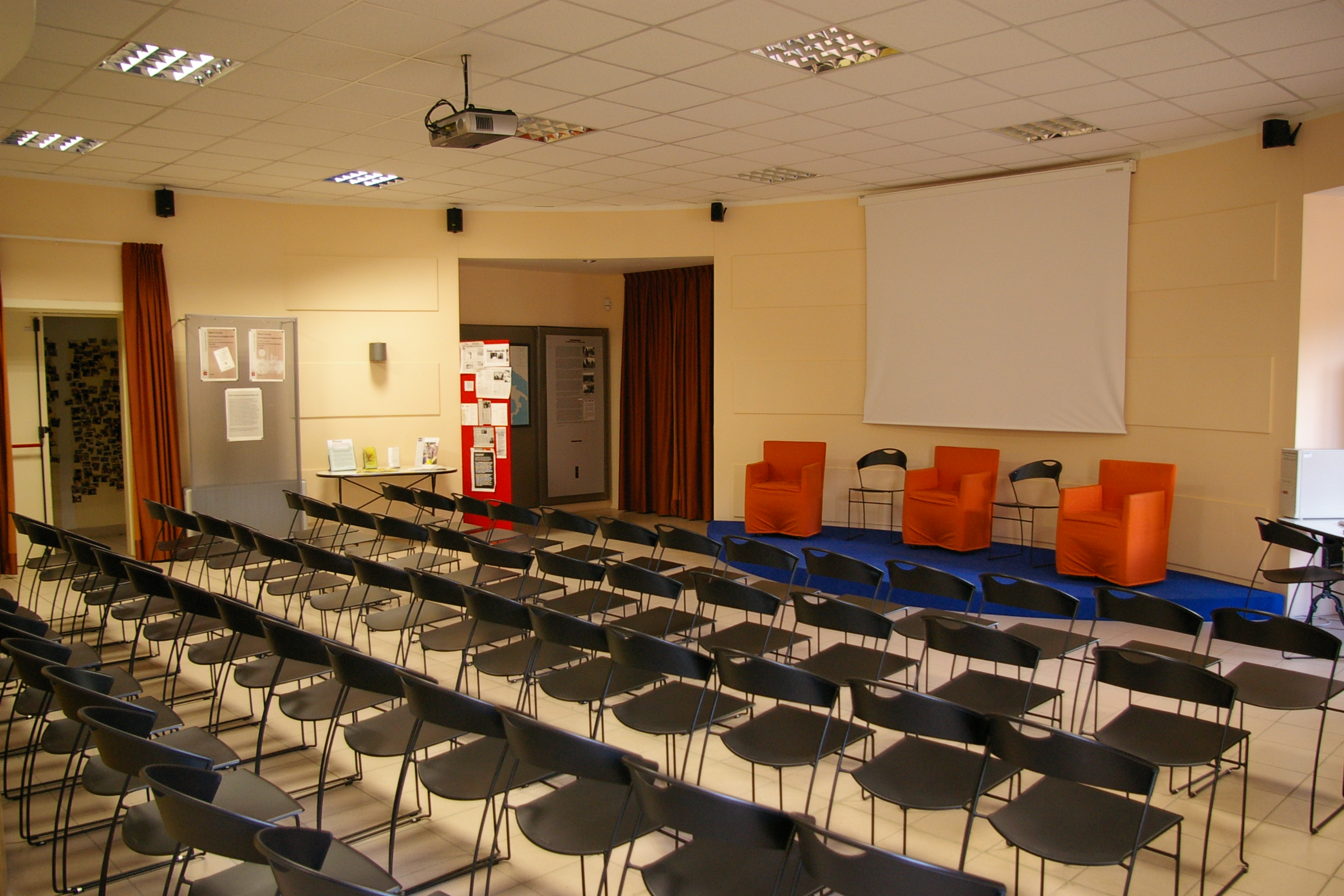
Conference room of the Documentation Centre

After a thematic introduction to the Nazi camp system, the Mauthausen concentration camp with its neighbouring camp Ebensee and an overview of the deportation from the Tuscany region, the main part of the exhibition, which extends over about 70 square metres, consists of objects from the tunnels of the Ebensee concentration camp. These were collected in the 1970s by Prateser survivors together with fellow citizens and finally donated to the Museum.

The museum also houses the former bell of the Ebensee camp roll call square, on loan from the municipality of Ebensee and an expression of the Prato-Ebensee town partner agreement made in 1987.

The contents of the museum are particularly aimed at pupils from the 8th grade onwards, but also at interested citizens of the region and from abroad. Admission is free of charge.

== The Documentation Center ==
The Documentation Centre is located on the first floor of the building. It has a conference hall with 70 seats, a library with about 3000 media items and three computer terminals. The research work is carried out not only in cooperation with local institutions and experts, but also within the framework of international projects and in cooperation with the partner institution, the Ebensee Museum of Contemporary History.

== Gallery ==
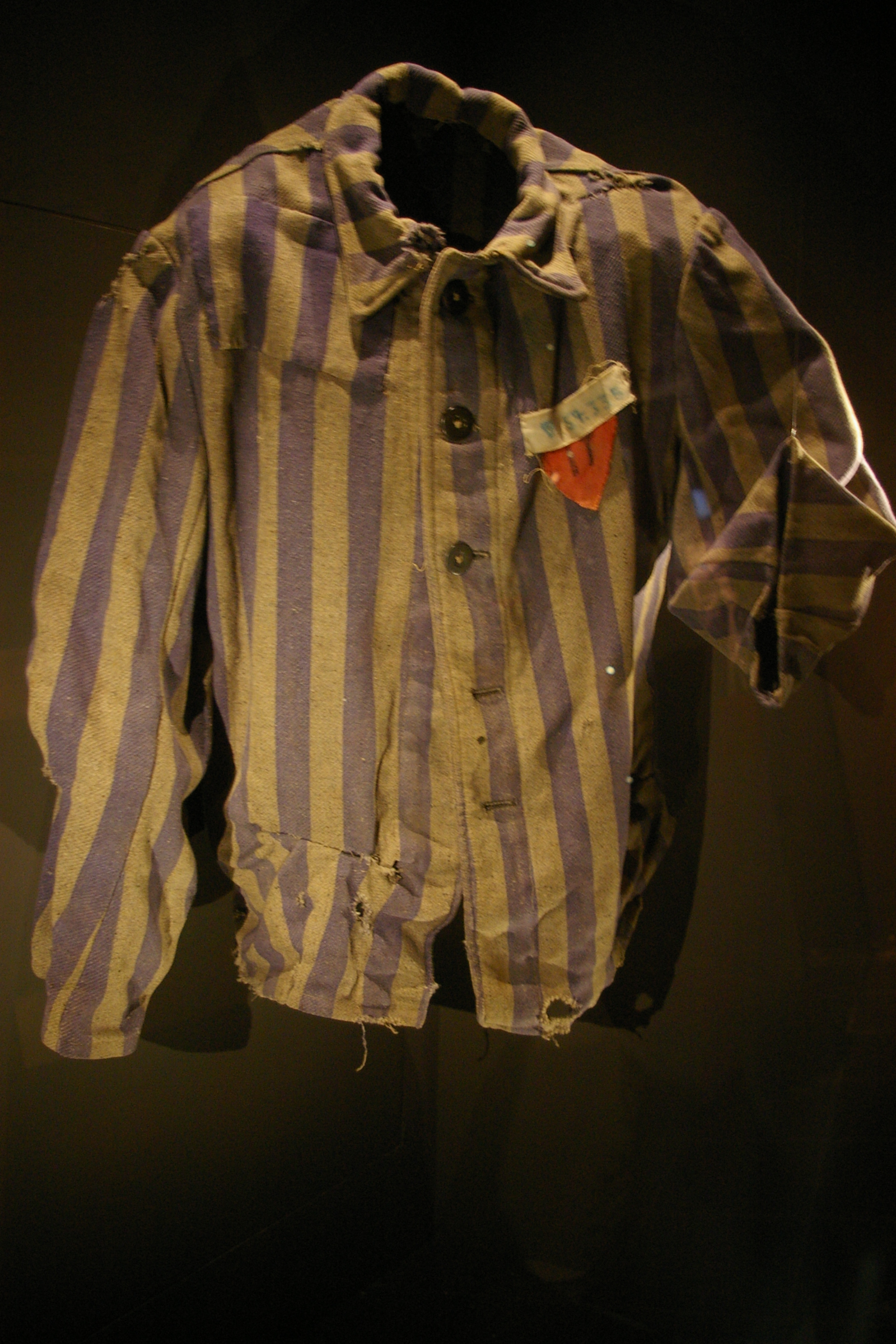
Prisoner jacket of an Italian deportee on display

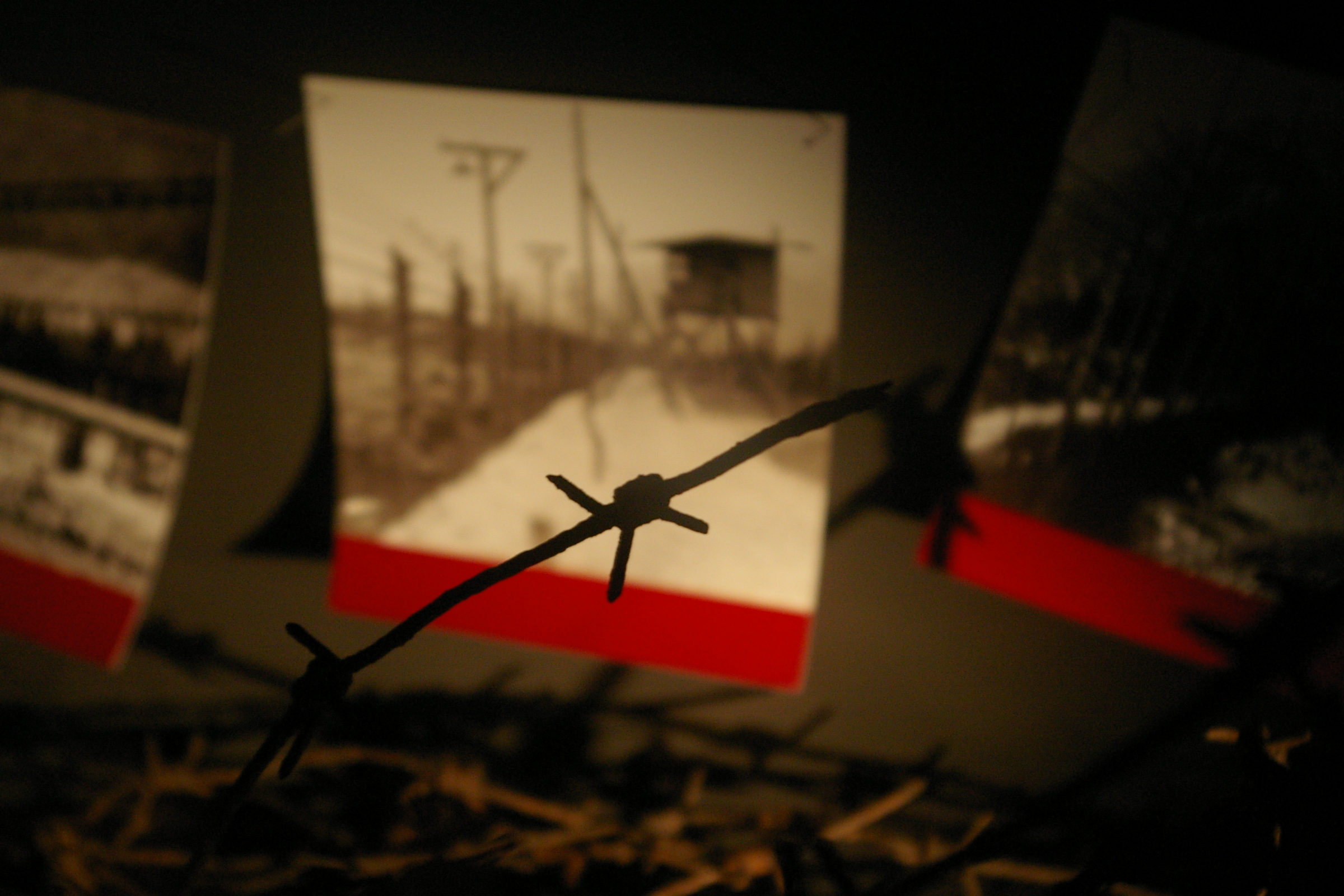
Exhibited piece of barbed wire from the Ebensee concentration camp

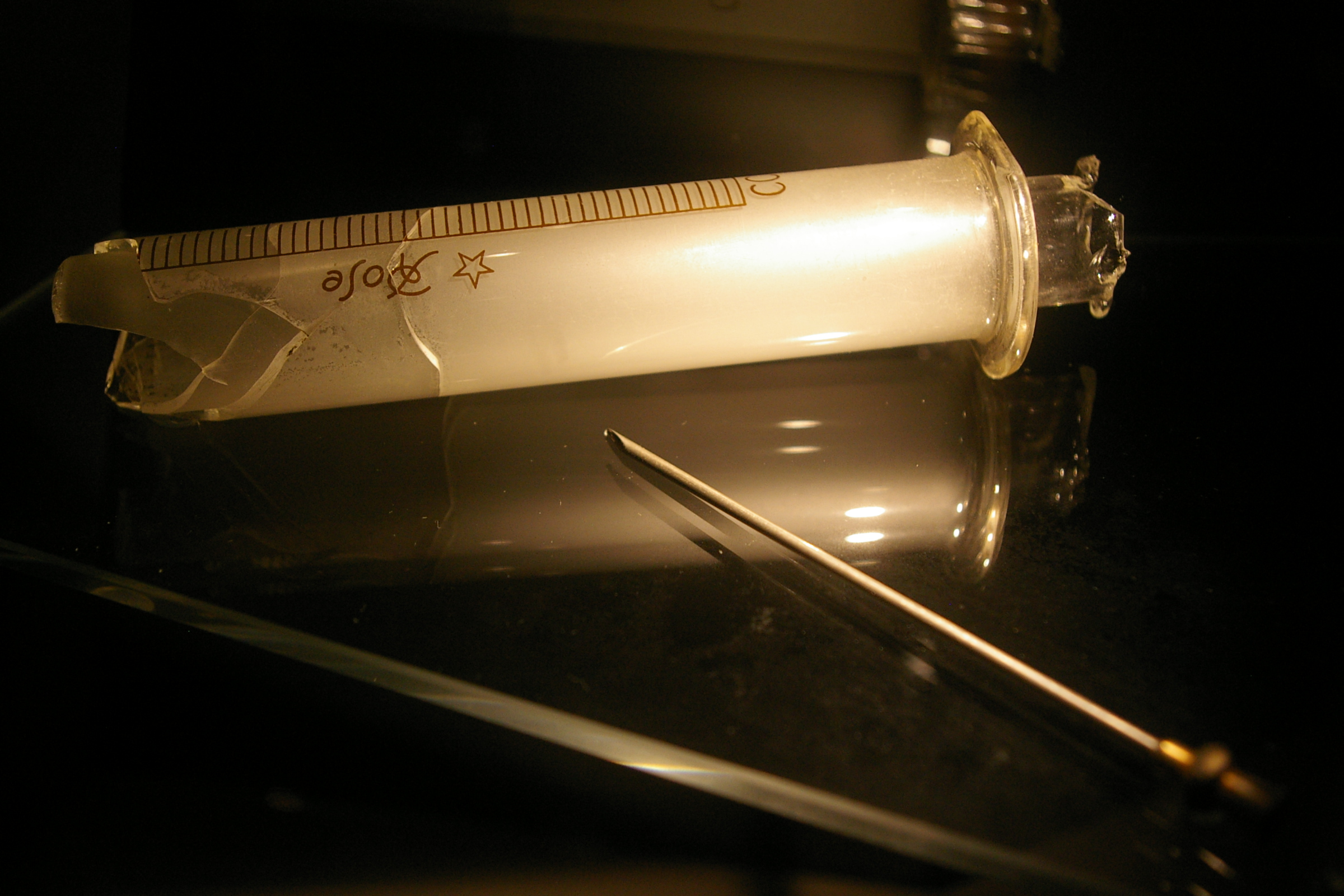
Exhibited syringe - syringes like these were used to murder prisoners

== See also ==
- Austrian Holocaust Memorial Service
