= Holocaust Museum of Porto =

Holocaust museum

Coordinates: 41.15298°N 8.63772°W

The Holocaust Museum of Porto (Portuguese: Museu de Holocausto do Porto) is a Holocaust museum founded in 2021 in Porto, Portugal.

== Organisation and exhibitions ==
The main themes treated at the new Museum are Jewish life before the Holocaust, Nazism, Nazi expansion in Europe, the ghettoes, refugees, concentration, labour and extermination camps, the Final Solution, the death marches, liberation, the postwar Jewish population, the foundation of the State of Israel, win or starve, the Righteous Among the Nations.

Visitors to the Museum will see a reproduction of the dorms of Auschwitz, a names room, a flame memorial, cinema, conference room, study centre, corridors with the complete narrative and, in the image of the Holocaust Washington Museum, photographs and screens showing films about the before, during and after the tragedy.

TimeOut classified the Holocaust Museum as the best museum in the city of Porto and in the first month it received around 10,000 visitors.

The Museum is run by members of the Jewish community of Porto. Luísa Finkelstein recalls the members of her family “who were shot by firing squads after being forced to dig a mass grave". Deborah Walfrid relates that her grandparents “were executed in Poland, after their heads were shaved, numbers were tattooed on their arms and they were used as slave labour”. Eta Rabinowicz Pressman recounts how two generations of her family imprisoned in Eastern Europe died: “In one case, the porter of the building wanted to save the children but they refused and said they wanted to go with their parents. They also died. The only surviving brother was imprisoned by the Soviets in a gulag in Siberia.” Other members of the Jewish community here in Porto have stories to tell about relatives who managed to escape from Treblinka or were forced to play the violin in Theresienstadt propaganda camp and even about German patriots who were accused of being unwanted aliens and assassinated.

The Museum also has a testimony from a victim of Auschwitz's Josef Mengele - Chaja Lassmann – who is the mother of one of the members of the Jewish Community of Porto who run the city's Holocaust Museum. Chaja says she is amazed that she could have children after the repeated experiences to which she was submitted.

In an article published in the United States of America on the importance of the Holocaust Museum of Porto, the Portuguese writer and journalist Miriam Assor wrote that "as a daughter of the rabbi who led the Jewish community of Lisbon for 50 years, born in a country where Jews were expelled five centuries ago—and living in a Europe where more and more people hate Jews, Judaism and Israel—I am infused with a sense of security from the museum. It is a reminder that the phrase “Never again”—about the savage murder of 6 million Jews in a genocide designed down to the last millimetre —cannot and must not be reduced to an epigraph."

According to the official site of the Jewish Community of Porto, the Holocaust Museum is included in a strategy to fight anti-Semitism, comprised already by the Jewish Museum of Porto, school visits to the synagogue, courses for teachers, historical films and charity missions in partnership with Porto Diocese.

The Holocaust Museum of Porto has signed a cooperation protocol with Porto's Jewish Museum to combat antisemitism in Europe. "These museums in Oporto should serve as a beacon of light to the rest of Europe, a land darkened today by resurgent antisemitism," President of B'nai B'rith International Charles Kaufman said.

In the meantime, Jonathan Greenblatt, the National Director of ADL, proudly announced that "The new Jewish museum will add to the respect and admiration many have for the Jewish people and the Holocaust museum will impart the lessons that all must heed: Don’t be silent in the face of evil. The more people know about the Jewish people, the less susceptible they are to hateful conspiracy theories and malign stereotypes."

On May 20, 2021, Rui Moreira, the mayor of Porto, spoke publicly with members of the local Jewish community about the great importance of the Holocaust Museum for the city.

The Holocaust Museum of Porto is donating its guestbooks to Israel's Yad Vashem via the Israeli embassy in Portugal, according to a museum representative and, in a ceremony at the Museum in November 2021, the International Observatory of Human Rights honored all victims of the Holocaust in the presence of two hundred students.
