= Flaminio Giulio Brunelli =

Italian physician, biologist, and a supporter of the humanistic clinical approach

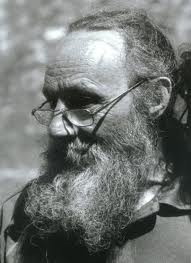
Giulio Flaminio Brunelli

Giulio Flaminio Brunelli (May 20, 1936, in Petrella Salto, Roma – September 7, 2004) was a physician, biologist, and a supporter of the humanistic clinical approach.

== Early research ==
Giulio Flaminio Brunelli was a physician and a biologist supporter of the humanistic clinical approach. During his medical training he attended several specialised centers, gaining a clear understanding of the need for an integrated interdisciplinary medicine approach. Still as a medical student, he began an internship as a researcher at the Laboratory of Experimental Pathology (in the Department of General Pathology within the Faculty of Biological Sciences, university of Rome). There, under the mentorship of the pathologist Domenico Ruffilli, a pupil of Guido Vernoni, he pursued an extensive research on the viral etiology of leukemia and developed original techniques for the cultivation of tissues, like the micromanipulation and quantitative cytochemistry. A few years later, he became medical assistant in the Laboratory of Cytochemistry, teaching and supervising also the training of undergraduates. In the same period he started the culture and study of the behavior of Rotifer and Paramecium, as he perceived there was a complexity in the ‘psychology ‘ of these living beings. As Brunelli himself stated in one of his lectures: "Back then, Sergei Tschachotin, a senior student of Pavlov, was working as a fellow researcher in my lab; he was studying completely different things, he was conducting experiments on reflexology and conditioning in small animals, such as Rotifers and Paramecium. I was very intrigued, because Tschachotin was able to do with these living beings - that have no specialised nervous structures - things I thought to be typical only of a highly organized nervous system. This affected some of my strong convictions acquired in my work and study of clinical pathology. It dawned on me as obvious, then and possibly even more obvious today, that a living being has no intelligence, but rather it is intelligence and that intelligence is not depending on the existence of a nervous system, but on the contrary, the nervous system is a product of the intelligence." During the same period Brunelli dedicated himself to the study of Psychodynamic Therapy Dynamic psychology and undertook a personal analysis and training. He became interested in the genetics of some neurosis and this led him to a different field of research with the Institute of Genetics, Faculty of Science, at the University of Rome, under the direction of Giuseppe Montalenti. He took part in an international research project concerning Thalassaemia, Fauvism and enzymatic polymorphisms.

== Theory of Closed Articulated Complex Systems: its genesis ==
Around the end of the ‘50s, Flaminio Brunelli began to formulate his own theory of biological systems, that he named in Italian, SCAC (Sistemi Complessi Articolari Chiusi - Closed Articulated Complex Systems). This theory, that can be considered part of the larger group of general theories dealing with ‘systems and complexity’, sprung from the need to have a useful tool to describe the organization of living beings, and, more in detail, to explain the stability of specific dynamic configurations, characterized by a continuous transformation of features, with particular attention on how some of them are repeated and persist over time. Brunelli took advantage of the logical tools offered by The Principia Mathematica by Alfred North Whitehead and Bertrand Russell and the studies of abstract algebra, under the guidance of Lucio Lombardo Radice, to support and develop his SCAC theory, whose clinical implications have been examined and researched starting from the mid ‘70s.. After working as lecturer of Clinical Methodology at Ceift from 1976 to 1991, Brunelli reduced his academic commitments in order to devote himself to the training of physicians and psychotherapists in “Bio-transactional“ Pathophysiology. He founded the SISNI (International Society of Integral “Somato-noology”) in 1994, to dedicate his time and knowledge practicing in research, applying his theory on clinical cases, teaching and supervising until his death in 2004.

== Impact and application of his work ==
The SCAC theory attracted since the ‘60s physicists, biologists, physicians, psychoanalysts, mathematicians, economists, and musicians; all sharing humanistic and scientific backgrounds. His work and theories have prompted interest and collaborations with the start of different integrated research groups for the many applications of the model:

- a clinical application, elaborated and laid down by the Brunelli himself
- a biological application, mainly developed by the Brunelli and Giancarlo Risso, his closest collaborator in the medicine field
- a socio - economic application, developed by Brunelli in co-operation with the Department of Political Sciences at the University of Padua
- a physics’ application, coordinated by Brunelli and a group of physicists at the university of Rome “La Sapienza”
- an application in the field of music (MIC – Motion - Computing - Composition), under the supervision of Emanuele Pappalardo since 2006, at the "Licinio Refice Conservatory" in Frosinone.

== Works ==
Brunelli's works and scientific production are principally known from the records of about 90 seminars and conferences covering over more than 20 years; and clinical lectures, collected by his students. His legacy is preserved in the Archives of the “Bio-transational Pathophysiology” association and are currently undergoing a careful elaboration and analysis, to be synthesized in material for educational use. Brunelli contributed to the first edition of the “Manuale di Pechino” - one of the first handbooks on acupuncture to have been translated into Italian from Chinese.

== Bibliography ==
The following are the only few available writings of Brunelli. The scarcity of reference material should not surprise, as Giulio Flaminio Brunelli was mainly interested in a pragmatical hands-on approach and spreading his knowledge within study groups. As already outlined in the biographical notes above, most of his scientific production is collected in the 'Archives of “Bio-transational” Pathophysiology'.

== Note ==
The main objective of the Theory of SCAC is to propose a method of analysis suitable to the complexity of systems, and in particular able to explain the dialectic of living systems. A method that can be also applied to different disciplines. Within the biology field, this goal has been manifested in the development of a specific discipline: the “Bio-Transactional Pathophysiology” (FBT in Italian), that rooted on the SCAC theory intend to encompass the entirety - both normal and/or pathological - of the interactions and biological events happening within a living organism, aiming at its survival. As the psychic and the corporeal dimensions are not separated one from the other, and the body is the manifestation of a system of structuring relationships organized on different levels according to a precise logic that is identical for all living being (from amoeba to humans), the “bio-transactional pathophysiology” [FBT] approach claims that a living being is essentially a structured collection of messages, representing a flowing communication in a closed circuit. For example, following the FBT theory, a bone represents the continuous and persistent signal between two joints: calcium will be metabolised in the places where the signal is manifesting consistently, meaning that it is not the bone that supports the system, but the system that supports the bone. The Bio-transactional Therapy was developed as the clinical application of the theory of Bio-transactional Pathophysiology.

Dissertations related to the SCAC theory:

- Alessandra Casciani, Riabiltazione motoria attraverso il Tai Chi Chuan, aspetti pedagogici della logica di movimento nella filosofia orientale. Tesi di laurea, I.U.S.M., Foro Italico Roma, a.a. 1997/1998, rel. Giuseppe Massara.
- Paola Munari, Il linguaggio come strumento di integrazione individuale nella prospettiva sistemica dei SCAC (Tesi di laurea, Università di Padova, Facoltà di Lettere e Fiolosofia, a.a. 2000–2001, rel. Giagiorgio Pasqualotto).
- Maurizio Bertolini, Studio di sistemi complessi articolari chiusi tramite una successione particolare di vettori a valori complessi (Tesi di laurea, Università degli studi di Torino, Facoltà di Scienze Matematiche, Fisiche e Naturali, Corso di laurea Triennale in Matematica, a.a. 2002–2003, rel.Hisao Fujita-Yashima.
- Simona Bonucci, Il modello biotransazionale in ambito riabilitativo. Un caso clinico (Tesi di laurea, Università degli studi di Roma La Sapienza, Facoltà di Medicina e Chirurgia, Corso di laurea Triennale in Fisioterapia-Azienda ospedaliera San Giovanni-Addolorata, a.a. 2003–2004, rel. Rita Vieri).
- Concetta Russo, Applicazione dell'Approccio Biotransazionale all'insegnamento della danza contemporanea, tesi di Diploma Accademico di II livello, Accademia Nazionale di Danza, Biennio Specialistico in Arti Coreutiche per la formazione di docenti in discipline coreutiche - indirizzo danza contemporanea, a.a. 2006–2007, rel. Francesca Falcone.
