= Carmelina Sánchez-Cutillas i Martínez del Romero =

Spanish historian and writer

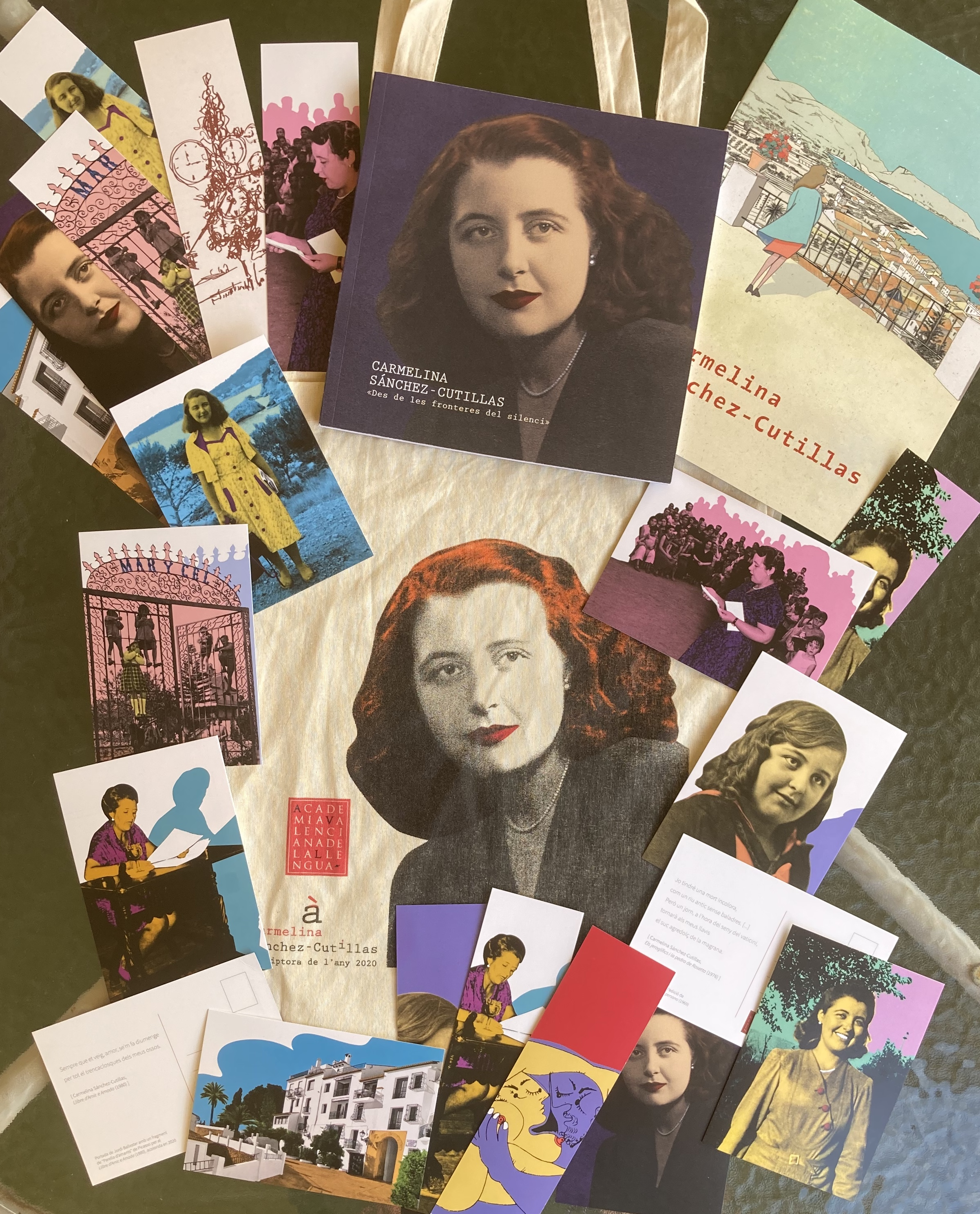
- Merchandise of Sánchez-Cutillas from the 2020-2021 Writer of the Year by the Valencian Language Academy
- Born: 23 June 1921; Madrid, Spain
- Died: 22 February 2009 (aged 87)
- Education: University of Valencia
- Occupations: Historian, author
- Writing career
- Notable works: Matèria de Bretanya (1975); Llibre d'Amic e Amada (1980)

Carmelina Sánchez-Cutillas i Martínez del Romero (Madrid, 23 June 1921 – Valencia, 22 February 2009) was a Spanish historian, novelist and poet in Catalan language. Winner of the first Competition of Valencian Poetry of the University of Kentucky, a selection of her poem book Un món rebel (A rebel world) was translated into English in 1969.
