= Fondation pour la Mémoire de la Déportation =

French foundation

Coordinates: 48.852462°N 2.3145°E

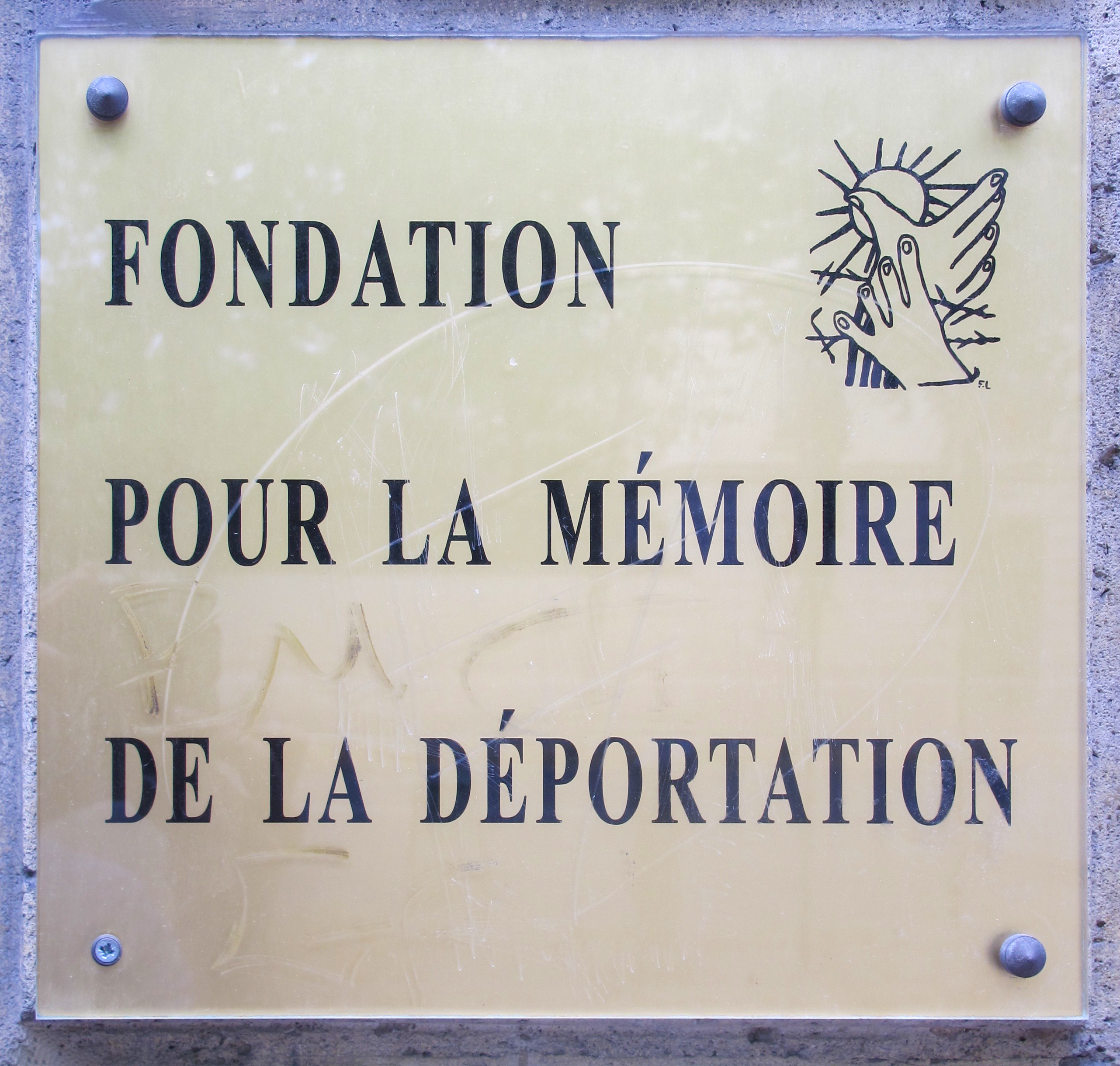
Nameplate

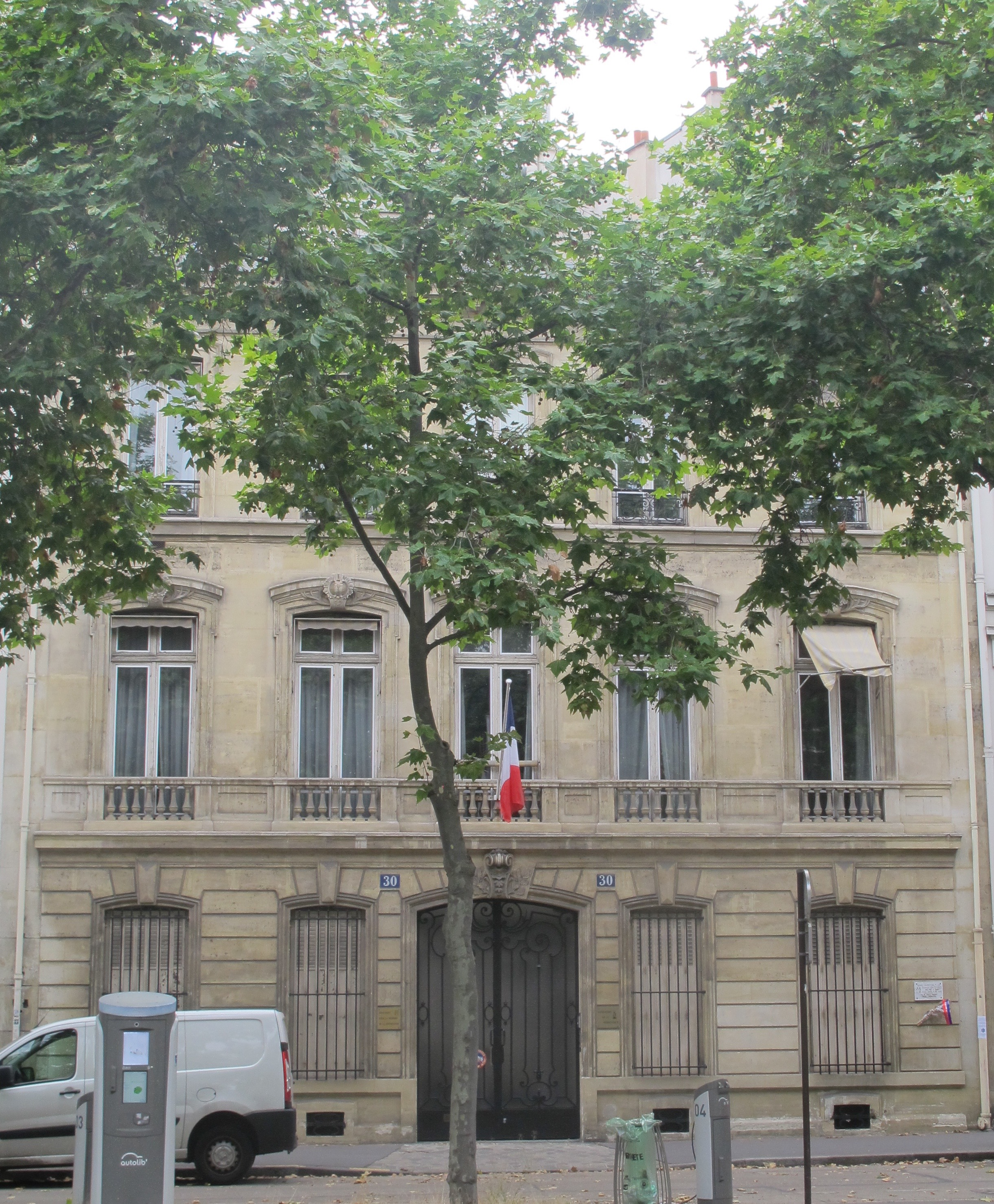
Domicile

The Fondation pour la Mémoire de la Déportation was founded on 17 October 1990 on the initiative of French Prime Minister Michel Rocard and the former Minister of the Interior. It is based in Paris.

It serves as a support organization responsible for a number of unions and associations that deal with the deportations and imprisonment carried out by Nazis and the Vichy regime in France from 1940 to 1945.

The foundation is one of many partner organizations of the Austrian Service Abroad (German: Auslandsdienst) and the corresponding Austrian Holocaust Memorial Service (Gedenkdienst).

== Mission statement ==
Rules are made by an 18-member council with representatives of the Ministry of the Interior, the French Ministry of Defence, the French Minister of National Education, the French Ministry of Finance, and others. Since March 2009, the Head of the Foundation has been Yves Lescure.

The foundation works on activities, alliances and initiatives of former internees, supports their families and preserves how internment and deportation affected them, as an historical monument for generations to come.

It operates on these principles:

- pérenniser (ensure survival): Literally, so we survive forever.
- défendre (protect) (lit. defend): Literally, to secure ourselves.
- s'opposer: (resist) Literally, to resist for ourselves.
  - Figuratively, to resist against every violation of freedom, dignity and the rights of people who suffer from totalitarianism.
- contribuer (contribute): To make sure that all documentary evidence from Nazism is preserved, as best one can.
- participer (participate): To contribute to the education of coming generations, to provide them with knowledge and respect over the horrible historical incidents.
- approfondir (deepen): To deepen the international publicity of the organisation, the knowledge of concentration camp prisoners and resistance in World War II out of the available information and documents of the “Fondation pour la Mémoire de la Déportation”.
- continuer: (carry forward) To support scientific research to learn more about how Nazism took hold.

== Aims ==
By teaching and understanding, the Institution has two aims:

- To remember those who were interned or deported
- To prevent it ever happening again.

== See also ==
- Fédération nationale des déportés et internés résistants et patriotes
- Historical revisionism (negationism)
- Human rights in France
- International concentration camp committees
- Mémorial des Martyrs de la Déportation
