= Giorgio Brunello =

Italian economist and Professor of Economics

Giorgio Brunello is an Italian economist and Professor of Economics at the University of Padova, where he retired and became Professor Emeritus in 2025. His research interests include education, migration, training, unemployment and wages. He ranks among the foremost labour economists in Italy.

== Biography ==
Giorgio Brunello earned a Laurea in economics from the University of Venice in 1979, followed by a M.Sc. in economics from the London School of Economics in 1981 and a Ph.D. in economics from Osaka University in 1987. After his graduation, Brunello became a lecturer in economics at Osaka University and was promoted to associate professor in 1989. In 1990, he returned to Italy, where he accepted a position at the University of Venice, first as assistant professor (1990–92) and then as associate professor (1992–96). Brunello was made full professor following his move to the University of Udine in 1996, but left already in 1998 to the University of Padova, where he has since worked as Professor of Economics. In parallel, he has held visiting appointments at Oxford University, the London School of Economics, and the University of California, Berkeley, among others.

Brunello maintains affiliations with several economic research institutes, being a research fellow at the IZA Institute of Labor Economics, CESifo, and the Research Centre for Education and the Labour Market at the University of Maastricht. Additionally, he is part of the European Network of Experts on the Economics of Education and was member of the Executive Committee of the European Association of Labour Economists (EALE) from 1997 to 2003 Finally, he performs editorial duties for the academic journals Economics of Education Review and Applied Economics Perspectives and Policy and has done so in the past for Labour Economics and Ricerche Economiche.

== Research ==
Giorgio Brunello's current research interests focus on the economics of education and training, applied health and personnel economics. Among other topics, Brunello has studied workplace training in Europe and its complementarity with education, the effect of school tracking on equality of opportunity, CEO turnover, the effect of body weight on wages, the relationship between non-cognitive skills, personality traits and labour market performance, and the effect of changes in compulsory schooling on education and wages.

According to IDEAS/RePEc, he ranks among the top 3% of economists in terms of research.
