= Giuseppe Brunelli =

Italian poet, essayist and translator (1922–2016)

Giuseppe Antonio Brunelli
- Born: 1922; Milan, Italy
- Died: 2016
- Occupations: Poet; essayist; translator

Giuseppe Antonio Brunelli (1922–2016) was an Italian poet, essayist and translator residing in Florence, Italy, where he concluded his tenure at the University of Florence, teaching French Language and Literature from 1946 to 1994. He was born in Milan, Italy, and prior to moving to Florence lived in Catania (Sicily) and Messina.

His works focused on philology as well as historical and literary criticism. His research encompassed publications ranging from the fifteenth to the twentieth century French literature, and he published volumes of his poems and translations in verse.

== Published works ==
- Brunelli, Giuseppe (1996) [1948]. Se canto se rido se gioco (poesie del periodo 1938-42) (The Sun on the Stairs) (Poems 1938-42) (in Italian).
- Brunelli, Giuseppe (1996) [1949]. Le cascate d'agosto (1949, poesie del periodo 1943-45 (The Falls of August - Poems 1943-45) (in Italian).
- Brunelli, Giuseppe (1948). Villon. Sei ballate tradotte da G.A. Brunelli (Ballads of Villon) (in Italian). Scheiwiller Milano.
- Brunelli, Giuseppe (1958). Jean Castel "Lo specchio delle Dame" e altri testi del XV secolo (Jean Castel, Women's Mirror and other 15th century texts) Translated by G.A. Brunelli (in Italian). Sansoni Firenze.
- Brunelli, Giuseppe (1964). L'amore e il tempo (Love and Time) (in Italian).
- Brunelli, Giuseppe (1971). Omaggio a Baudelaire (Homage to Baudelaire) (in Italian). Bastogi-Foggia.
- Brunelli, Giuseppe (1993). Paul Valéry. Cantique des colonnes, Sept sonnets, Palme (in Italian). University of Florence Press.
- Brunelli, Giuseppe (1999) [1984]. Poesie per Giovanna (Poems For Giovanna) (in Italian). University of Florence Press.
- Brunelli, Giuseppe (2003–2005). Rive del tempo - Riberas en el tiempo (in Italian). curator A.G. Morgado.
- Brunelli, Giuseppe (2005). Antologia (in Italian). University of Florence Press.
