= Duccia Camiciotti =

Italian poet, writer and essayist

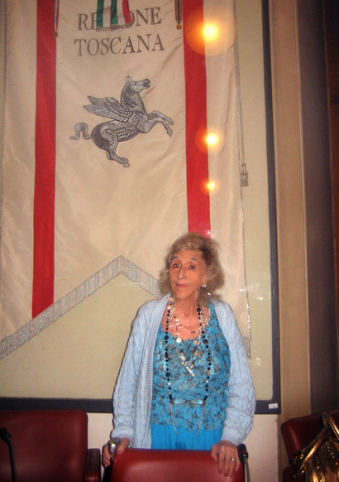
- Born: 19 March 1928; Bracciano, Italy
- Died: 7 July 2014 (aged 86); Florence
- Occupations: Poet; writer; essayist
- Spouse: Claudio Battistich
- Writing career
- Genres: poetry, essay, fiction
- Notable awards: Ibiskos Prize 1999

Duccia Camiciotti (19 March 1928 – 7 July 2014) was an Italian poet, writer and essayist.

== Studies and early life ==
Camiciotti's studies were founded in the Classics. She attended Silvio d’Amico Academy of Dramatic Arts (Silvio d’Amico Accademia d’Arte Drammatica) under the guidance of director Orazio Costa. She graduated with a degree in journalism from the University of Urbino, where she attended the school of literary and aesthetic criticism of humanist Carlo Bo. She became a teacher of Aesthetics at the Sharoff-Staniwslawskji Theater Academy in Rome, Italy.

Camiciotti met her husband, Claudio Battistich, in Florence, Italy, where she was his assistant as Director of the Center for Oriental Studies.

Camiciotti is an Executive Advisor and President of the Camerata dei Poeti, the city of Florence's Chamber of poetry in the tradition of the Florentine Camerata, and on the Board of Advisors of the Modigliani Art Center of Scandicci. Her five poetry collections have won cultural prizes. Her work has been reviewed by leading Italian newspapers such as La Nazione, Il Giornale, the Corriere di Firenze, and Poesia. In 2010 he starred in the literary artistic encounter "From Florence to the Stars" organized by La Pergola Arte Florence Art and curated by Peter Michael Musone to the Regional Council of Tuscany with book of poetry "The Last Anomalous Wave". A resident of Florence, Italy, her poetry has been presented in readings with contemporaries Alda Merini, Maria Luisa Spaziani, and Mario Luzi, and she traveled to Moscow, Russia for cultural literary events with Russian poet Eugene Evtushenko in association with Russia's Minister of Foreign Culture.

== Bibliography ==
=== Published works ===
- Camiciotti, Duccia (2009). Ultima Onda Anomala (The Last Anomalous Wave) (in Italian). L'Autore Libri. ISBN 978-88-517-1861-9.
- Camiciotti, Duccia (2009). Il Quotidiano della Beat Generation (The Beat Generation's Daily) (in Italian). Bastogi Editrice (Foggia). ISBN 978-88-6273-163-8.
- Camiciotti, Duccia (2008). Rapsodia (Rhapsody) (in Italian). Gabrieli International.
- Camiciotti, Duccia (2006). Nostro quotidiano delirio (Our Daily Rapture) (in Italian). L'Autore Libri Firenze. ISBN 978-88-517-1084-2.
- Camiciotti, Duccia (2003). Shangrila (in Italian). Aletti Editore (Roma).
- Camiciotti, Duccia (2002). Nelle Braccia di Gea (In the Arms of Gaia) (in Italian). Chegai Editore - Firenze.
- Camiciotti, Duccia. Figurazione (in Italian). Tacchi Editore (Pisa).
- Camiciotti, Duccia. Risposta del vento (The Wind's Reply) (in Italian).
- Camiciotti, Duccia. Sogno ricorrente (Recurring Dream) (in Italian).
- Camiciotti, Duccia (1999). Cantico Per Un Paesaggio Del 2000 (Canticle for the Year 2000) (in Italian). Edizioni Il Ramo D'Oro.
- Camiciotti, Duccia (1996). Eden Perduto (Eden Lost) (in Italian). Edizioni Il Ramo D'Oro.
- Camiciotti, Duccia (1994). La Conchiglia del Nautilo (in Italian). P.Chegai.
- Camiciotti, Duccia (1989). Il Prozio Silas ed altri racconti (Prozio Silas and other stories) (in Italian). Pietro Chegai Editore.
- Camiciotti, Duccia. Il tempo di Meg Dombrowskji (with Claudio Battischi) (in Italian).

=== Anthologies ===
- Slanci e partecipazione (Impulse and Sharing); Bastogi Editors

=== Periodicals and magazines ===
- Pegasus (Art Director, Contributing Editor)
- Città di Vita (City Life) (Editorial Board)
- Alla bottega (To the Store)
- Angeli e Poeti (Angels and Poets)
- Milano
- Orizzonti (Horizons) (Rome, Italy)

== Awards and honors ==
- 2008 Sacravita Poetry Prize
- 1999 Ibiskos Prize (for Recurring Dream) Turin Book Fair
- Habere Artem prize ("Sangrila", Aletti publishers)
- Brunellesco Prize (La Donna Nell'arte)
- Romena Prize
- Casentino Prize
