= Austrian Service Abroad =

- Auslandsdiest Österreichs
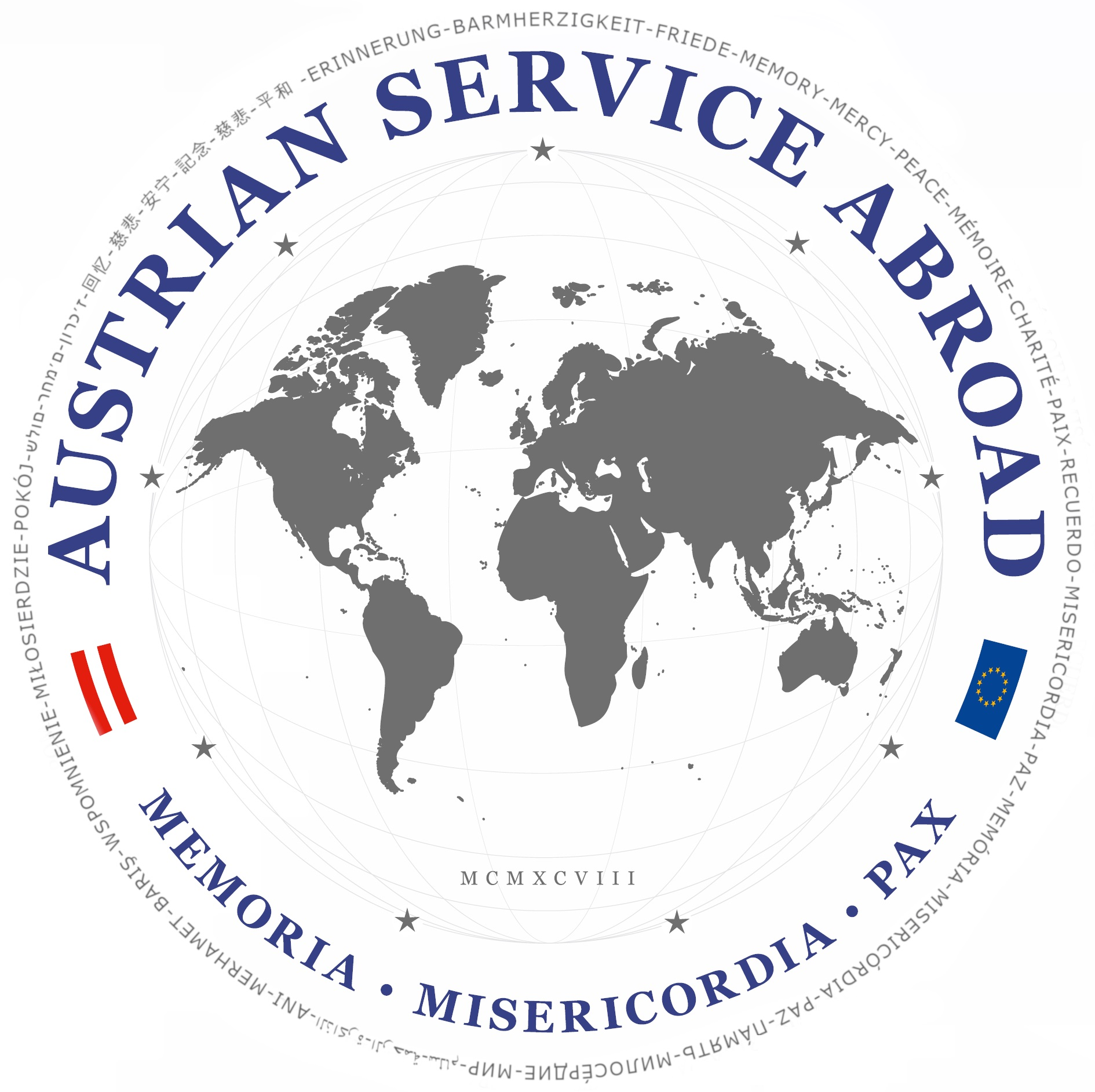
- Seal of the Austrian Service Abroad
- Formation: 1998
- Type: Non-profit organization
- Purpose: Holocaust remembrance, antisemitism, anti-fascism, humanitarian aid, development aid, peace movement, environmental protection
- Headquarters: Vienna, Austria
- Region served: Global
- Services: Volunteering service, national service alternatives
- Method: Education, study trips, seminars, workshops, awards
- Fields: Memoria (remembrance), misericordia (mercy), pax (peace)
- Chairman: Tobias Aigner
- Website: www.auslandsdienst.at/en

The Austrian Service Abroad (German: Auslandsdienst Österreichs) is a non-profit organization funded by the Austrian government which sends young Austrians to work in partner institutions worldwide serving Holocaust commemoration in form of the Austrian Memorial Service, supporting vulnerable social groups and sustainability initiatives in form of the Austrian Social Service and realizing projects of peace within the framework of the Austrian Peace Service. The Austrian Service Abroad is the issuer of the annually conferred Austrian Holocaust Memorial Award.

== General information ==
The Austrian Service Abroad has its origin in the acknowledgement of the Austrian government, in particular by chancellor Franz Vranitzky in 1991, regarding the Austrian people's share of responsibility for the crimes committed by National Socialism during WWII. The initiative initially started in form of the Memorial Service in 1992. In 1998 the organization Austrian Service Abroad, named 'Association for Services Abroad' until 2006, was founded adding the Austrian Social Service and the Austrian Peace Service.

The organization provides young male Austrians a government-funded alternative to the compulsory military service by sending them to institutions of Holocaust commemoration, social service or peace promotion for a time period of at least 10 months. It also provides volunteers of all genders a platform to work in its partner institutions for 6 to 12 months, while being financially supported by the Austrian government for their work abroad.

The Austrian Service Abroad is funded and supervised by the Austrian Ministry of Social Affairs and subject to the Austrian Federal Act on the Promotion of Voluntary Services (Bundesgesetz zur Förderung von freiwilligem Engagement.)

Before being sent out as Austrian Servants Abroad the candidates undergo a preparation period (typically 1.5 years) during which they are educated on the subject-matter relevant to their place of assignment. They are also being trained with professional skills via contributing to the work-flow of the organization.

Once a year the president of Austria and the Austrian Ministry of Foreign Affairs invite all Austrian Servants Abroad of the year before departure for a reception at the Hofburg and the Ministry of Foreign Affairs respectively. The Austrian Servants Abroad are commonly referred to as "little ambassadors of Austria".

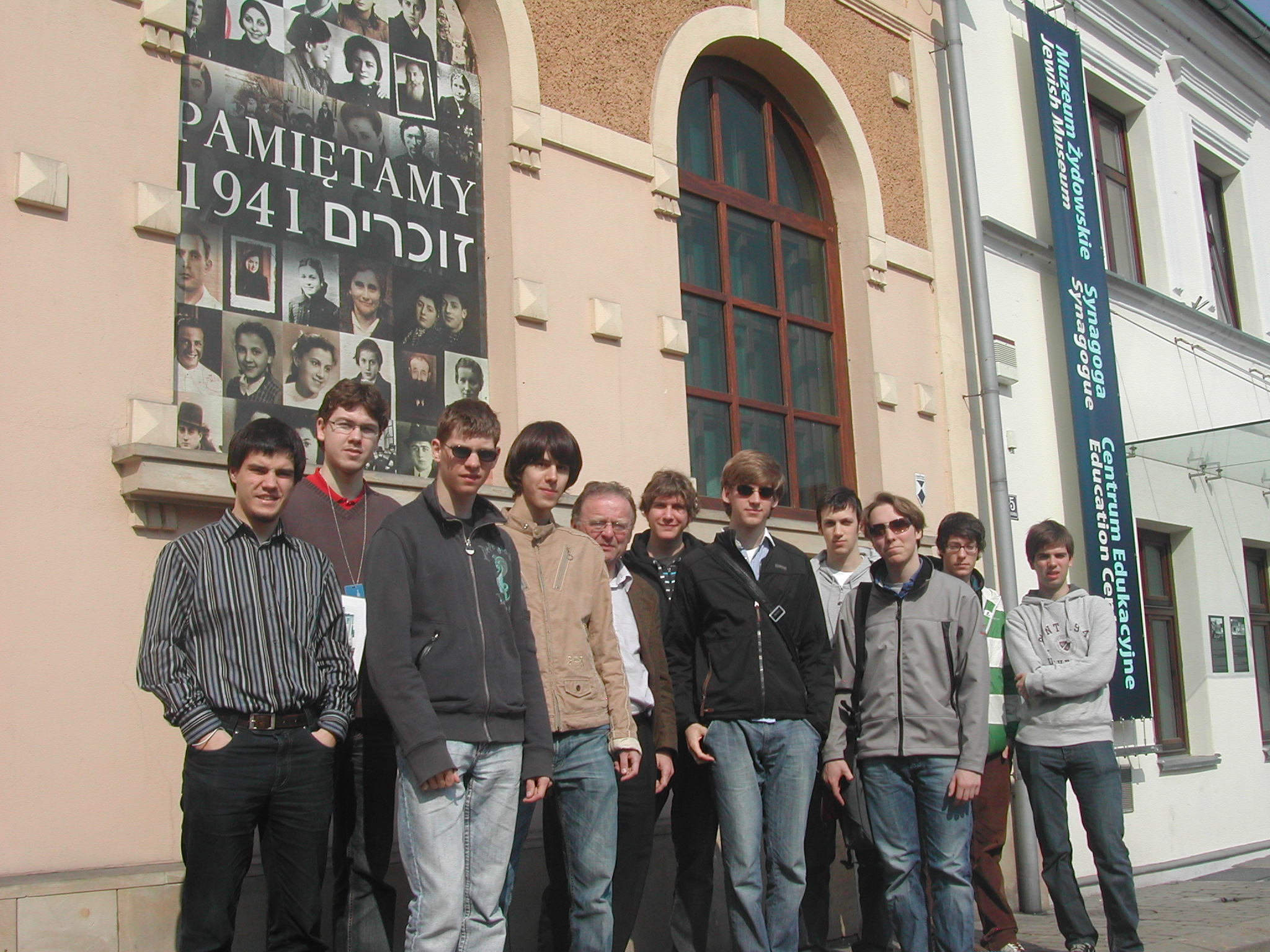
Gedenkdiener with Andreas Maislinger in front of the Auschwitz Jewish Center, Poland 2009

The Austrian Service Abroad is non-confessional and non-partisan.

The Austrian Service Abroad cooperates with the Austrian Ministry of Foreign Affairs. The servants abroad are obliged to cooperate with the Austrian embassy in their respective host country.

Some of partner institutions or organizations are the Auschwitz Jewish Center in Oświęcim, Poland, Yad Vashem in Jerusalem, Israel, the Simon Wiesenthal Centre in Los Angeles, United States, the World Jewish Congress in New York, United States, the Center of Jewish Studies Shanghai in Shanghai, China, the Russian Research and Educational Holocaust Center in Moscow, Russia, the Melbourne Holocaust Museum in Australia, the Tom Lantos Institute in Budapest, Hungary, the Ashraya Initiative for Children in Pune, India, and A chance for children in Zigoti, Uganda.

The Austrian Service Abroad is also a partner of the Israeli Volunteer Association partnering on the initiative Understanding Israel in conjunction with the Austrian Ministry of Social Affairs.

== Types of service ==
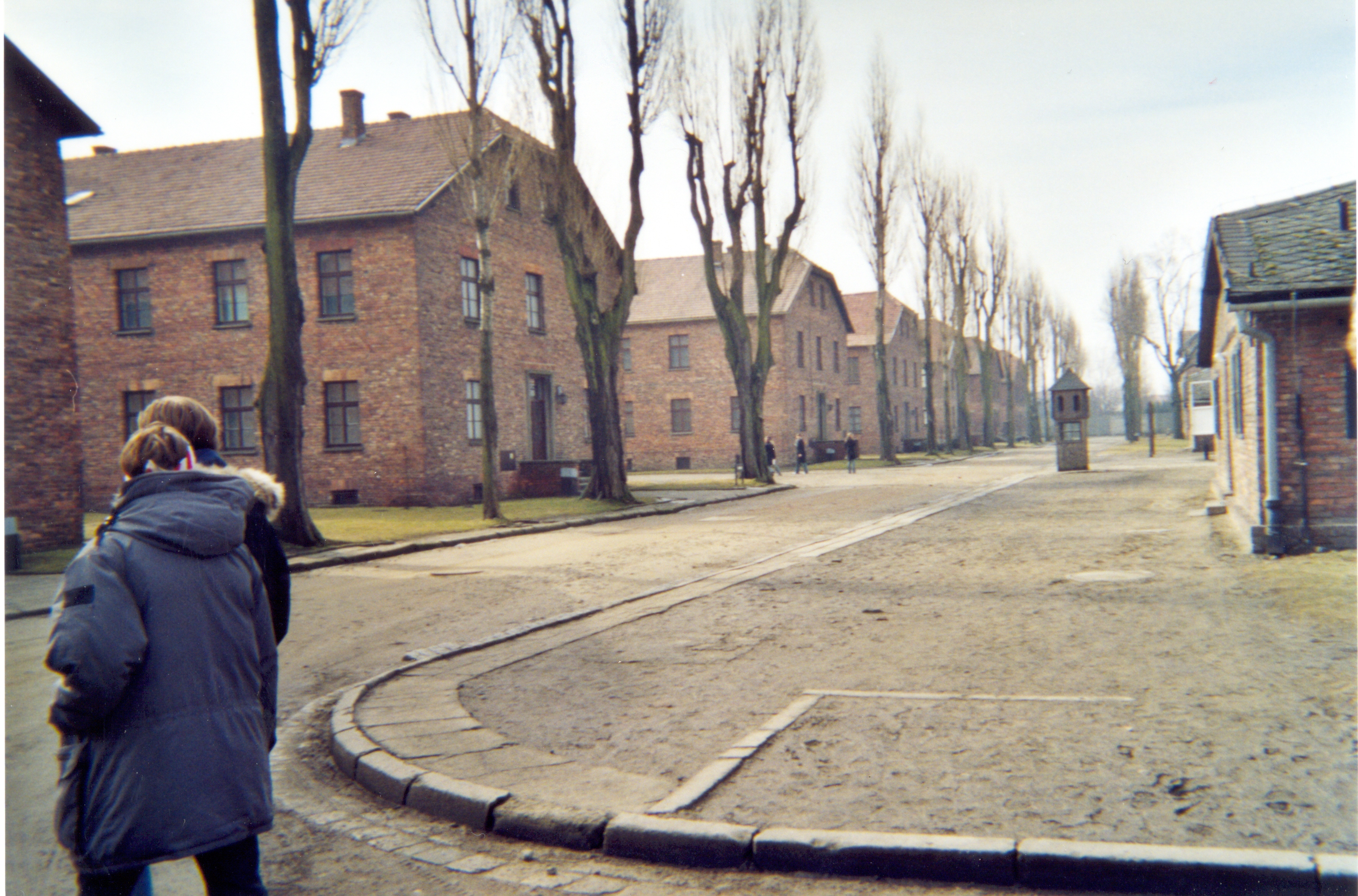
First young Austrian Holocaust Memorial Servant started in Auschwitz on September 1, 1992

=== Austrian Memorial Service (Österreichischer Gedenkdienst) ===
Austrian Memorial Service is the concept of facing and taking responsibility for the darkest chapters of one's own country's history while ideally being financially supported by one's own country's government to do so. Memorial Service has the acknowledgment of, the apology for and the assumption of responsibility for atrocities done by one's own country's society in history as its basis. Memorial Service is about honesty with one's country's past and the desire to rectify past wrongs. Memorial Service is about providing people of the perpetrator's side a platform for education and going to the victim's side to serve the remembrance of the evil done and the commemoration of its victims. Memorial Service is about peace on the basis of honesty regarding the past.

The program was founded in 1992 and has been a part of the association Austrian Service Abroad since 1998. It remembers the crimes of Nazism and commemorates its victims. Gedenkdiener work for Holocaust remembrance memorials and institutions as well as research facilities. Examples are the Simon Wiesenthal Center in Los Angeles, the World Jewish Congress in New York, the Jewish Museum Berlin, the Auschwitz Jewish Center in Oswiecim or Yad Vashem in Jerusalem.

In addition, Austrian Holocaust Memorial servants are also sent to serve in former refuge countries of the victim groups persecuted by the Nazis, for example to the Casa Stefan Zweig in Petrópolis (Brazil) or the Center of Jewish Studies Shanghai (China).

The program annually confers the Austrian Holocaust Memorial Award to actors "who have shown special endeavors for the memory of the Shoah".

=== Austrian Social Service (Österreichischer Sozialdienst) ===
Austrian social servants serve vulnerable social groups, support the economic and social development of the host country and contribute to environmental protection. They are active in projects relating to street-children, homeless people, educational projects and children villages, elderly and handicapped care, medical care, etc.

An example type of project is the improvement of drinking water supplies in countries of the Third World. Andreas Daniel Matt, the first Austrian social servant was sent in 2004 to a SOS children's village in Lahore (Pakistan).

Since October 1998 hundreds of Austrian social servants have been assigned mainly to countries in Central and South America, Africa and Asia.

Since 2018 the Austrian Service Abroad also partakes in the program Understanding Israel, sending young Austrians to do social service at child-care places and handicapped-care facilities in the state of Israel in cooperation with the Israeli Volunteer Association.

=== Austrian Peace Service (Österreichischer Friedensdienst) ===
Austrian Peace servants are stationed in organizations serving the achievement and protection of peace in connection with (armed) conflicts. They work, for example, at the Hiroshima Peace Culture Foundation in Japan, the John Rabe House in Nanjing, China, the Dayton International Peace Museum in Ohio, USA, the Peace Palace in The Hague and the Centre for Peace, Nonviolence and Human Rights in Osijek, Croatia.

== Partners ==
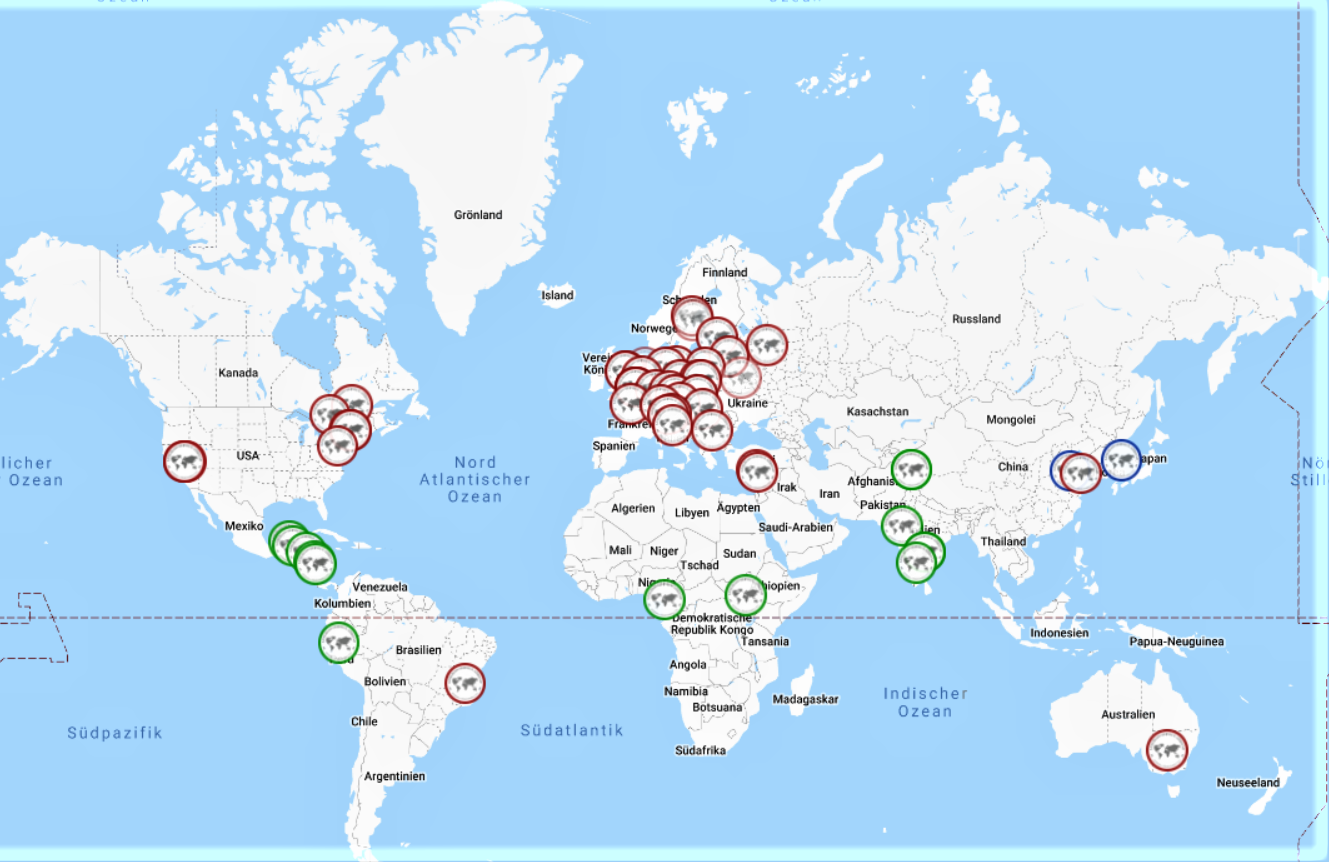
Red: Austrian Holocaust Memorial Service, Green: Austrian Social Service, Blue: Austrian Peace Service

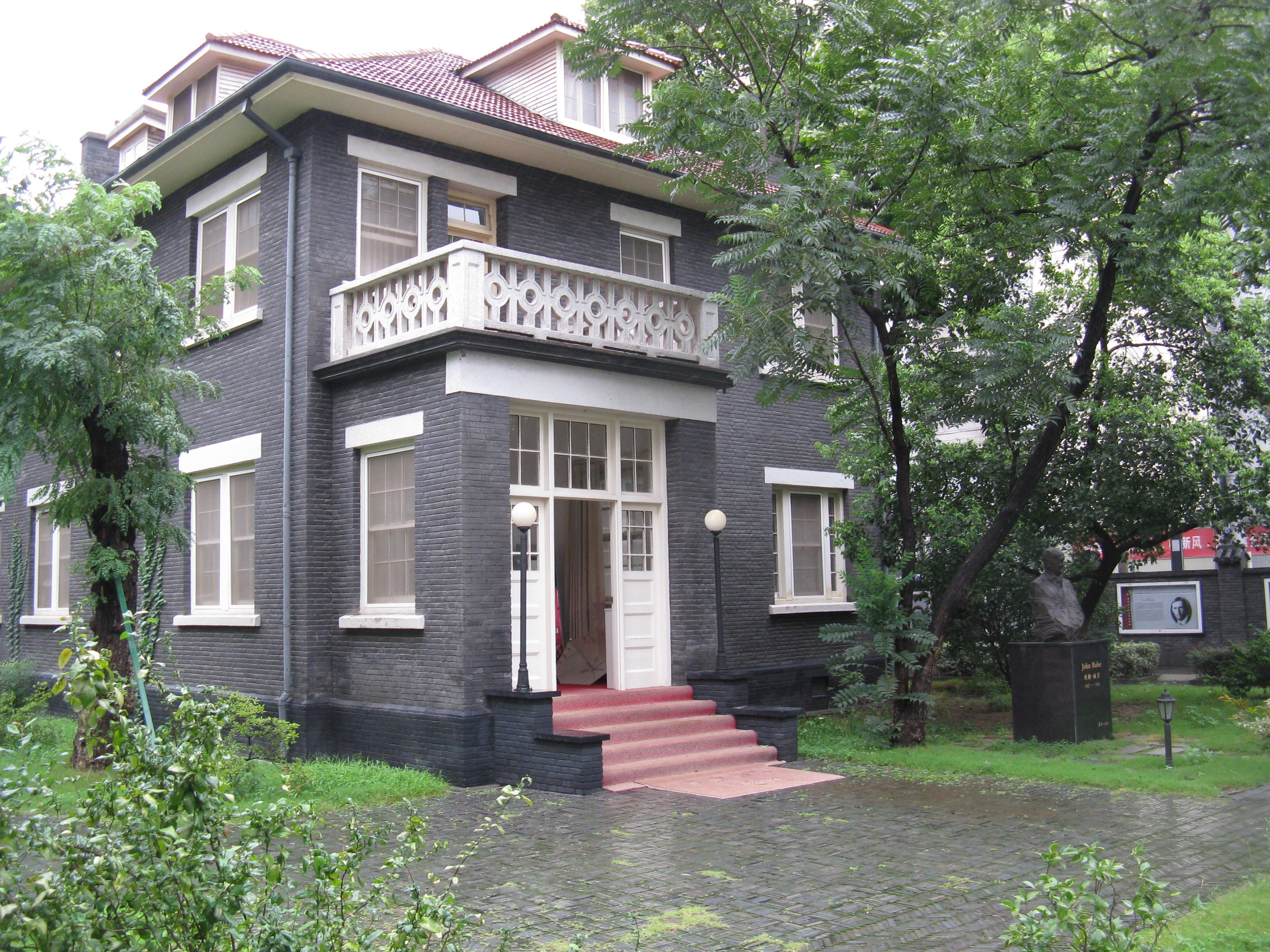
John Rabe House in Nanjing

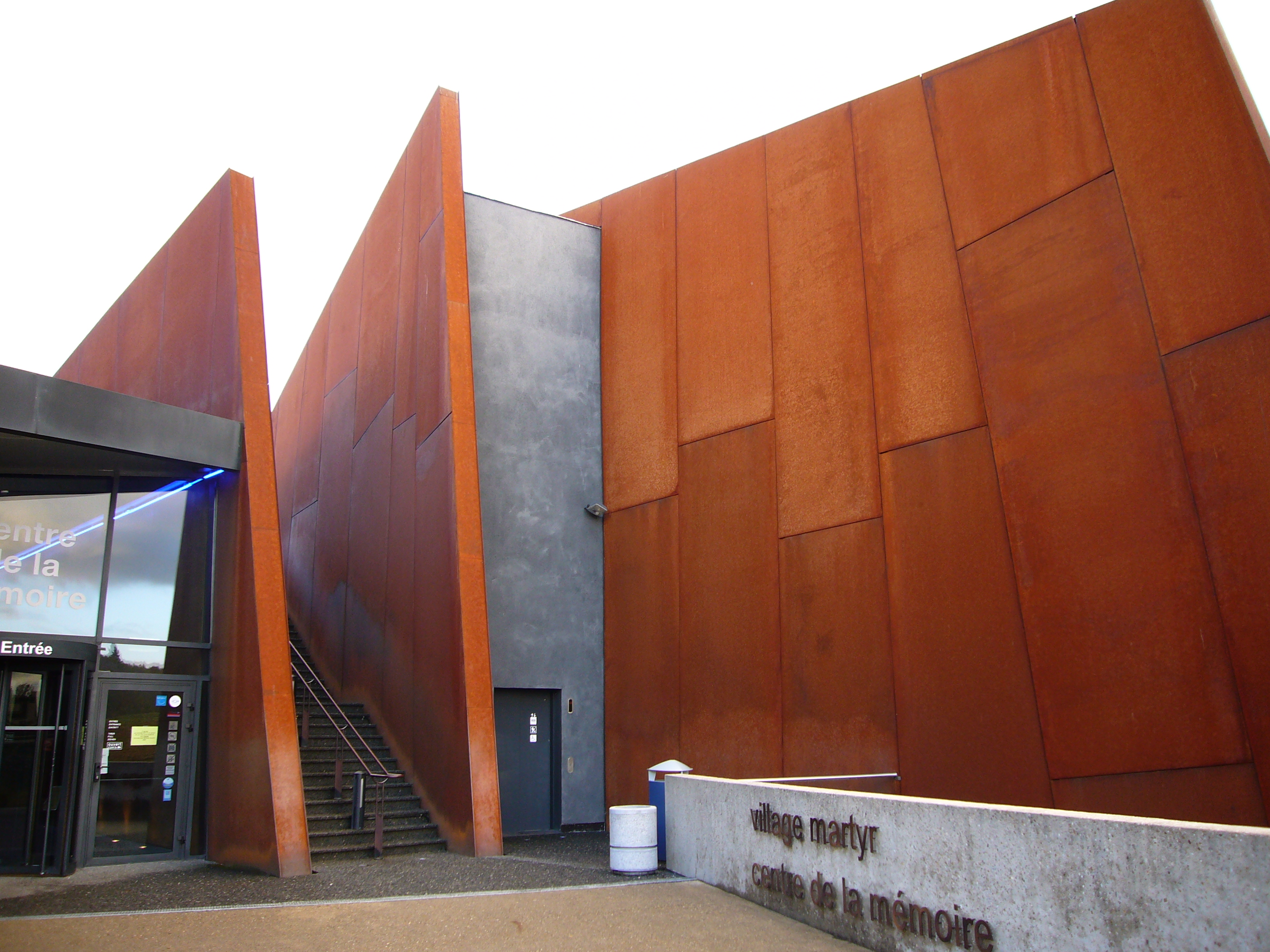
Centre de la mémoire d'Oradour

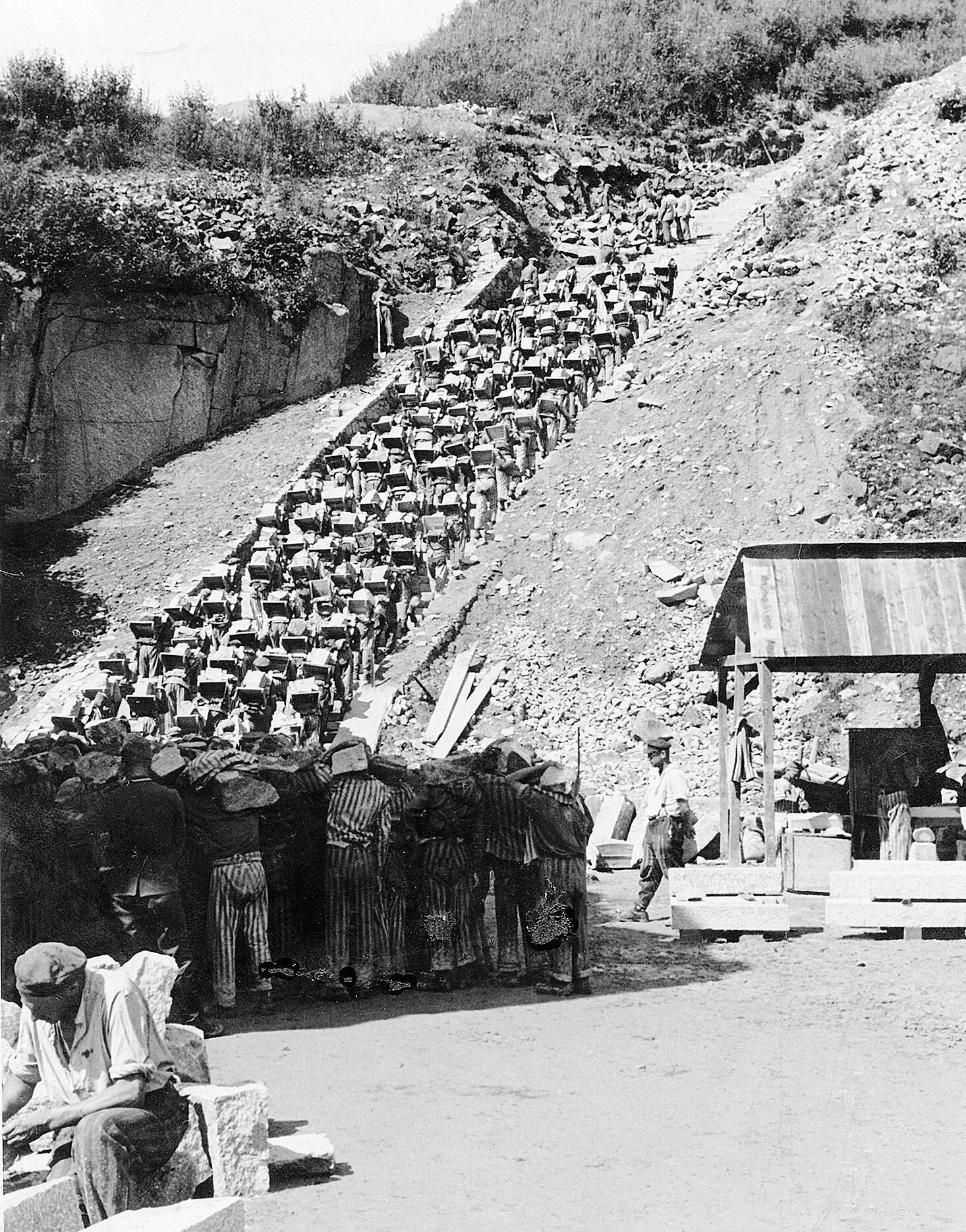
Amicale de Mauthausen

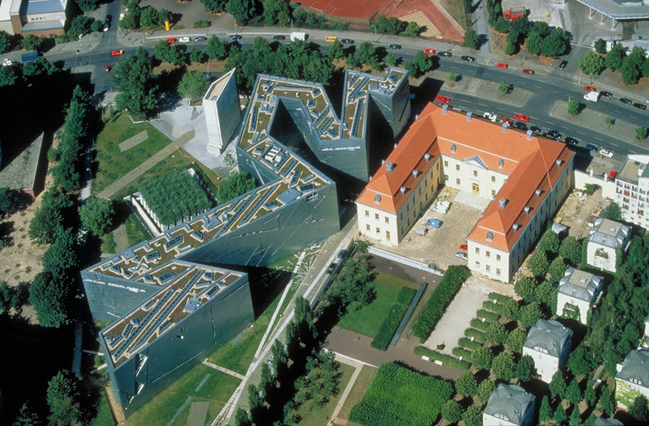
Jewish Museum Berlin

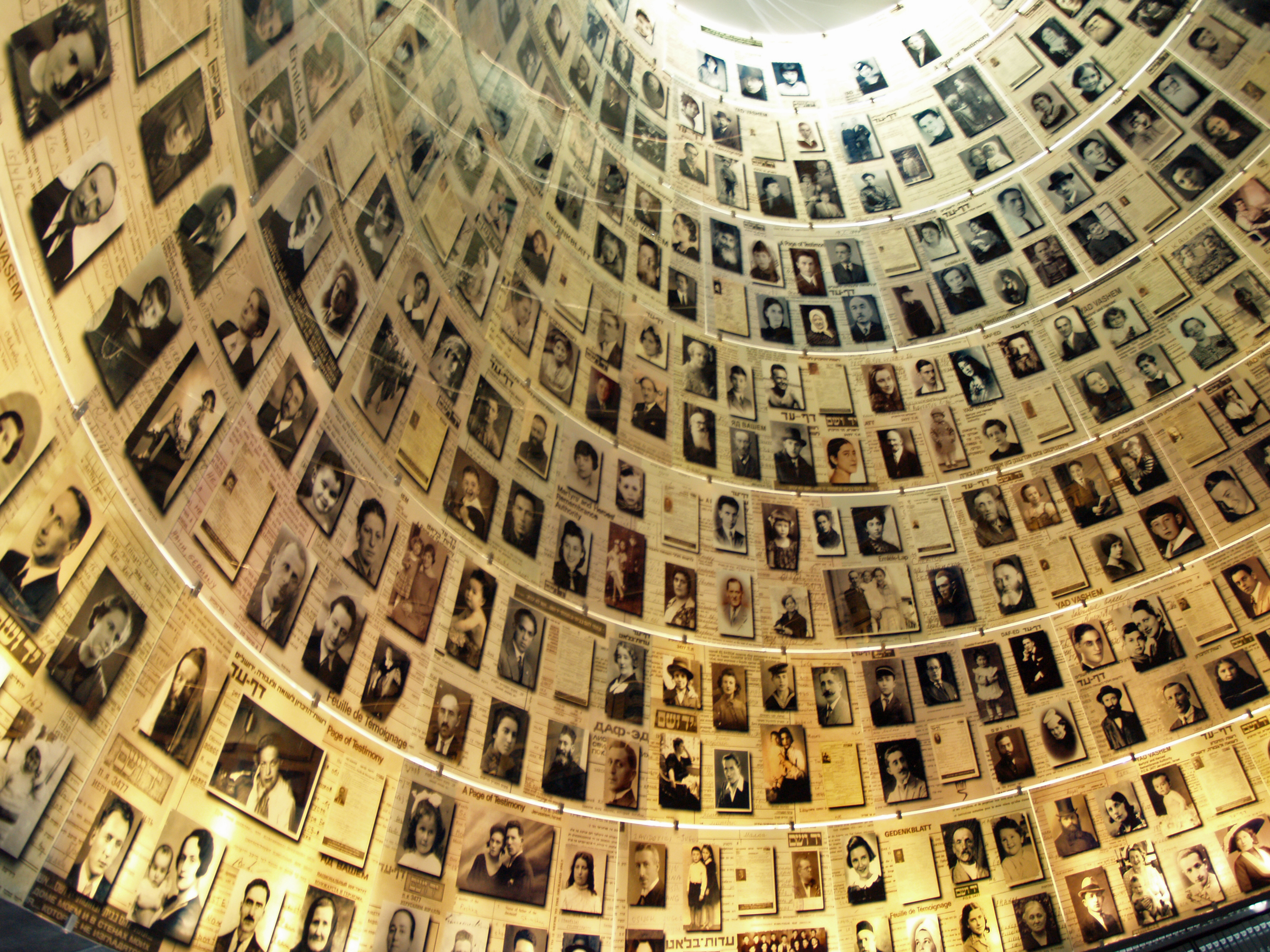
Yad Vashem in Israel

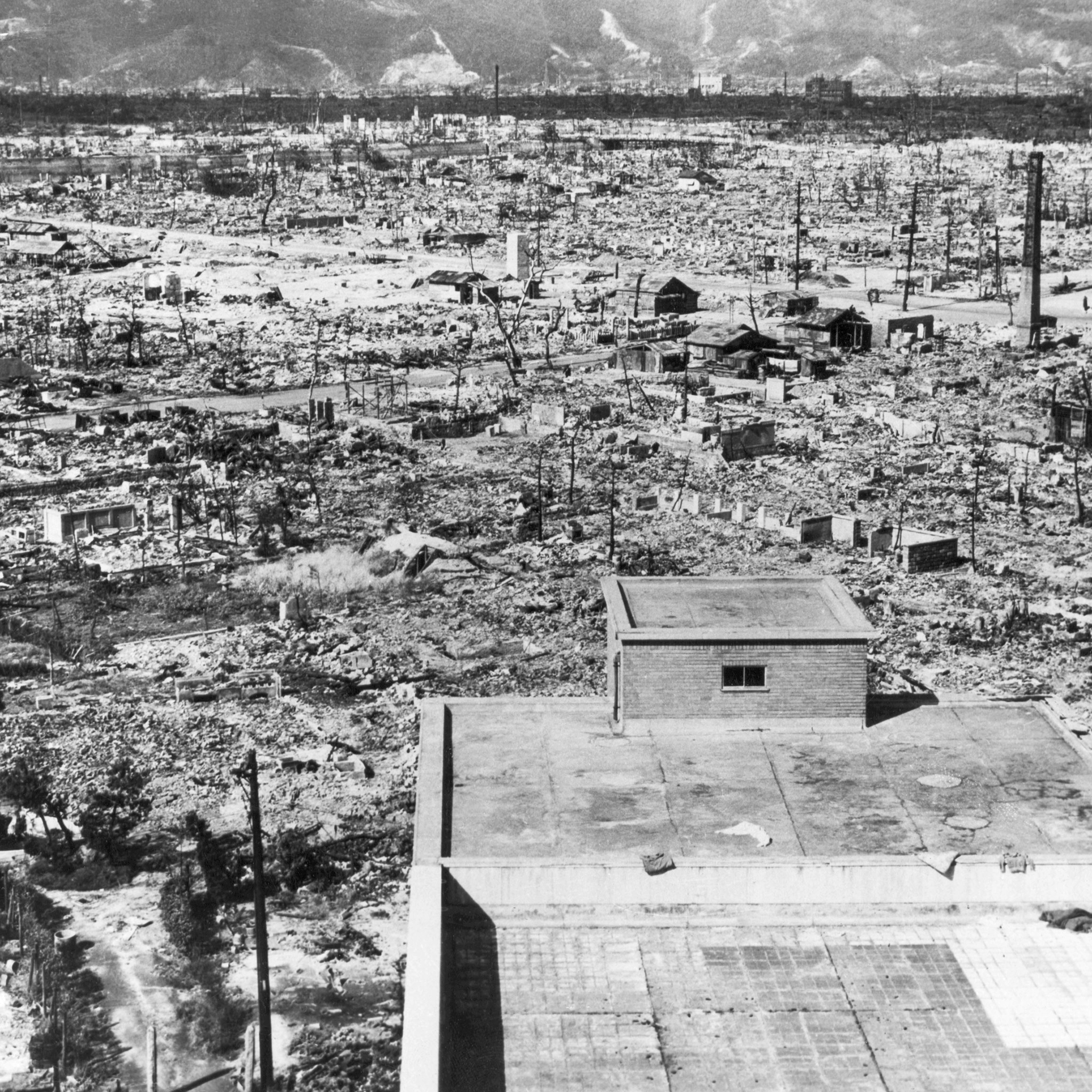
Hiroshima Peace Culture Foundation

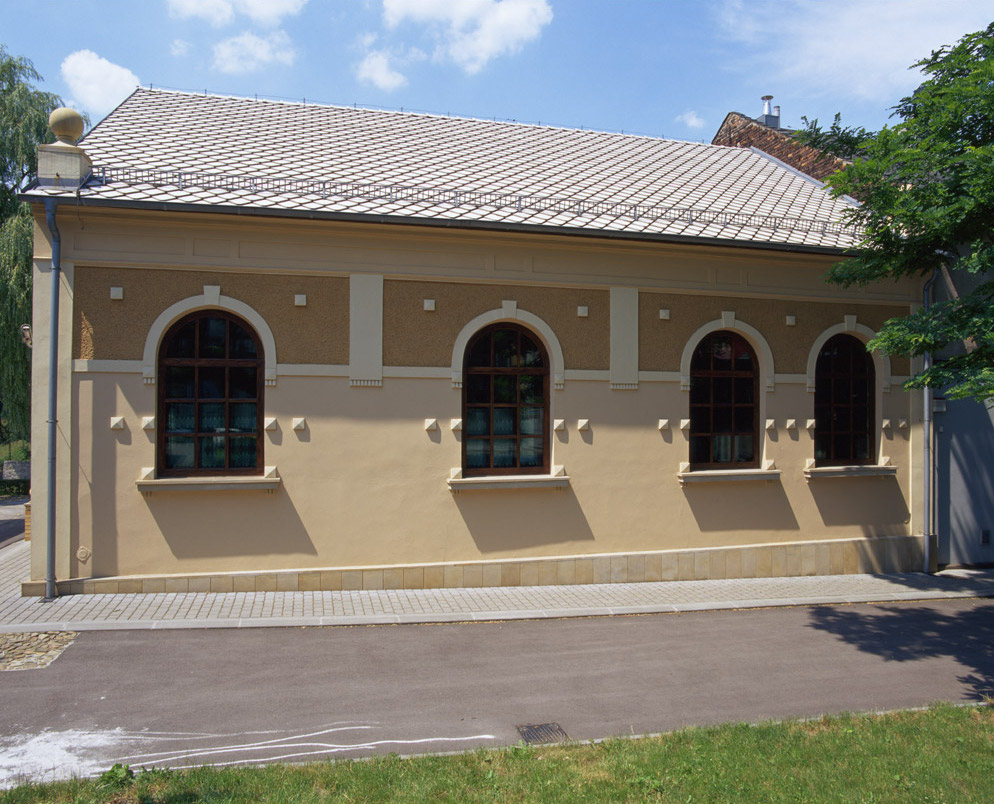
Synagogue next to Auschwitz Jewish Center

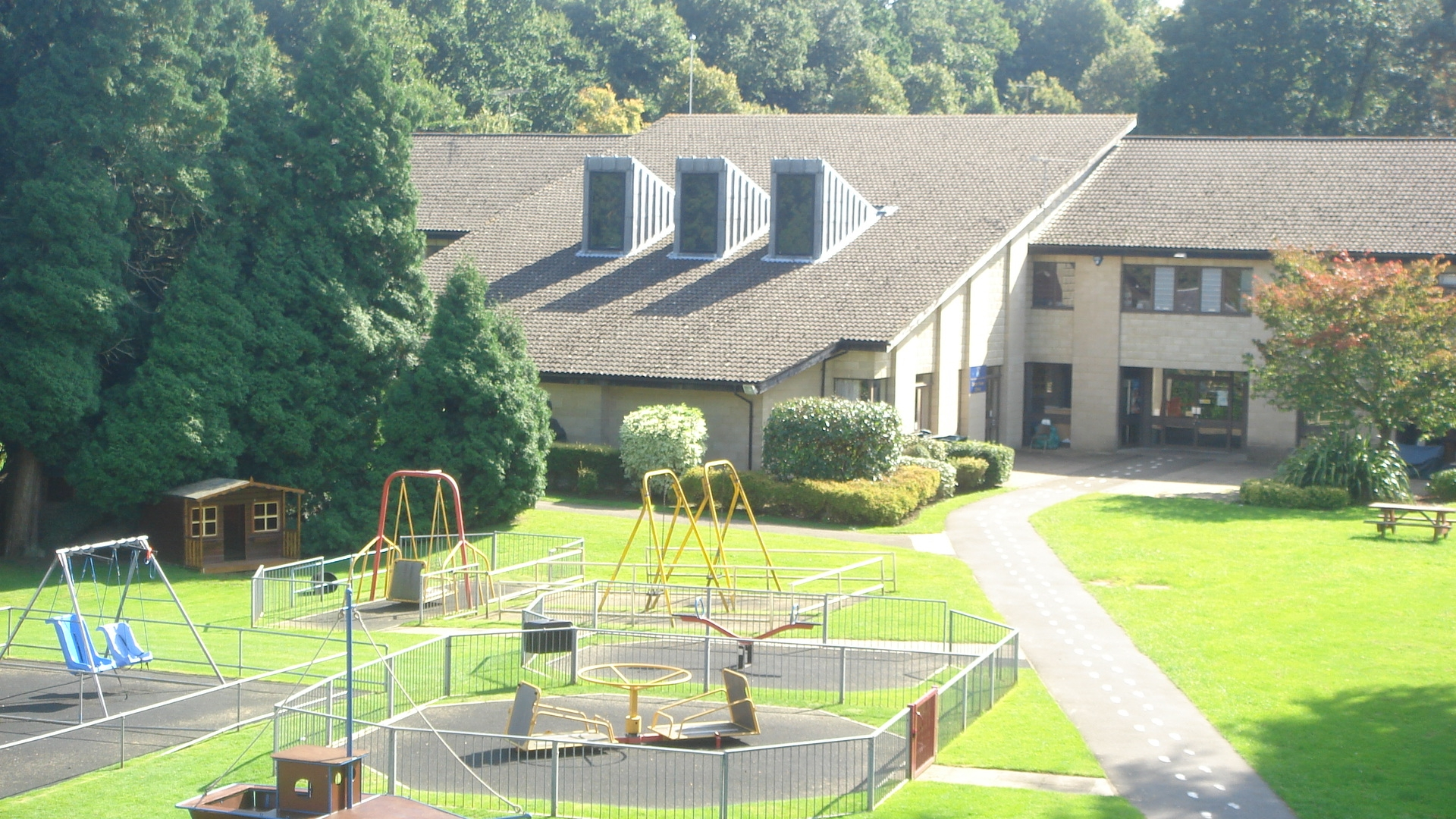
Dorton House School

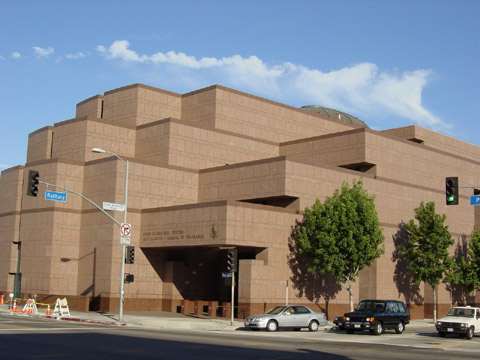
Simon Wiesenthal Center

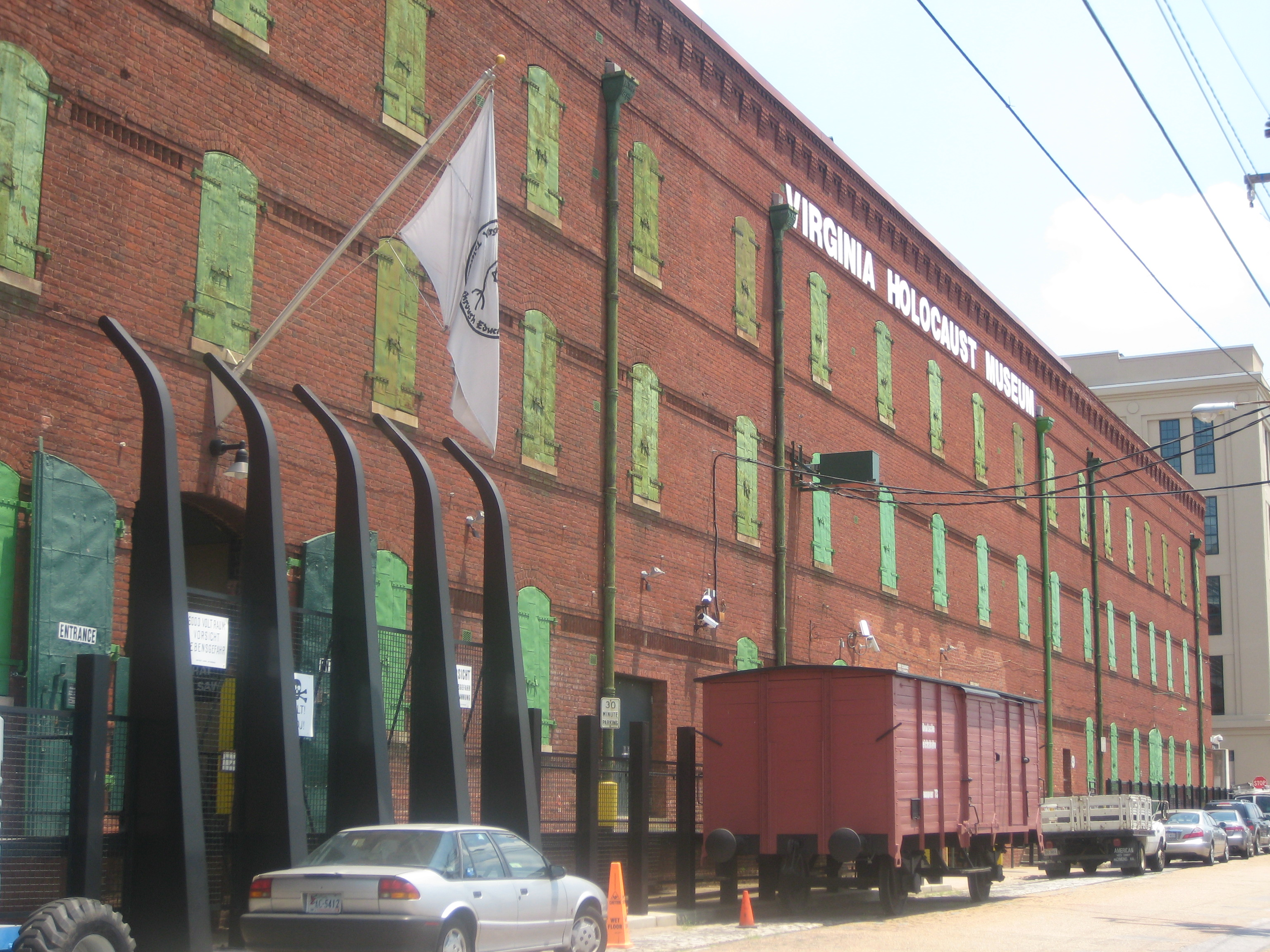
Virginia Holocaust Museum in Richmond

At present, Austrian Service Abroad sends young Austrians to the following partner institutions:

Argentina

- Buenos Aires - Center for homeless children and adolescents

Australia

- Melbourne - Jewish Holocaust Museum and Research Centre

The Jewish Holocaust Museum and Research Centre considers the finest memorial to all victims of racist policies to be an educational program which aims to combat antisemitism, racism and prejudice in the community and foster understanding between people. The Austrian Holocaust Memorial Service representatives work in different fields and areas of responsibility, undertaking translation, research, working in the library and on the museum’s database, and helping with exhibitions and events.

Belarus

- Minsk - Belarusian Children's Hospice
- Minsk - Dietski Dom No. 6 (Children's Home No. 6)
- Minsk - Kindergarten for Children with Special Needs

Belgium

- Brussels - Centre for Historical Research and Documentation on War and Contemporary Society
- Brussels - European Union of Jewish Students

Bosnia and Herzegovina

- Sarajevo - Phoenix Initiative

Brazil

- Alagoinhas - Associacao Lar Sao Benedito
- Lauro de Freitas - Community Centre Christ Liberator
- Petrópolis - Casa Stefan Zweig
- Rio de Janeiro - Center for Justice and International Law (CEJIL)

Bulgaria

- Sofia - Schalom - Organization of the Jews in Bulgaria

Canada

- Montreal - Holocaust Memorial Centre

The Montreal Holocaust Memorial Centre was founded by a group of Holocaust survivors and opened to the public in 1979. Through its Museum, its commemorative programs and its educational initiatives, the Centre aims to alert the public to the dangers of anti-Semitism, bigotry and hate, while promoting respect for diversity and the sanctity of human life. The field of activity of an ‘Austrian Holocaust Memorial Volunteer’ at the Montreal Holocaust Memorial Centre is very diverse. The duties range from helping with tasks in the office, to translations (German-English) as well as to research assistance or to the description and digitization of collection artefacts. Another essential part of the work schedule is covering the museum front desk. In doing so, the volunteer interacts with Holocaust survivors, students, teachers and visitors to coordinate tours and to ensure a proper daily routine. Furthermore, the volunteer is involved in several projects and events including “Witness to History”, “A Bar &Bat Mitzvah to Remember”, “Kristallnacht Commemoration”, and others.

- Montreal - Holocaust Education and Genocide Prevention Foundation

The Austrian Holocaust Memorial Servant at the former “Kleinmann Family Foundation” which is now entitled Holocaust Education and Genocide Prevention Foundation digitalizes and archives artifacts, documents and photographs as well as maintains and improves the database and the website. The volunteer gives presentations in high schools and colleges about the Holocaust and Moral Responsibility. The servant also interviews Holocaust survivors for "Oral History"-projects.

- Toronto - The Azrieli Foundation
- Toronto - Toronto Holocaust Museum

Initially established as a joint partnership between Jewish Federation of Canada-United Israel Appeal of Canada's University campus Hillel Canada and United Jewish Appeal Federation of Greater Toronto's Sarah and Chaim Neuberger Holocaust Education Centre, volunteers now work for the new Toronto Holocaust Museum, formally known as the Sarah and Chaim Neuberger Holocaust Education Centre. s. The intern will be supporting students in developing new education programs in terms of the Holocaust with the center and on university campuses. Other tasks are: support for the organization of the education trip to Vienna for Canadian, Jewish students, outreach to, and maintaining connection with local schools in terms of Holocaust education-related activities.

China

- Beijing - Beijing International Peace Culture Foundation
- Shanghai - Center of Jewish Studies

The Center of Jewish Studies Shanghai (CJSS) was established in 1988 as an institute of the Shanghai Academy of Social Sciences, the oldest and second biggest political think tank in PR China.Under Prof. PAN Guang’s leadership the CJSS has established itself as one of the leading research institutes in China studying Judaism and Israeli affairs. The CJSS focuses its research on three academic fields: (1) the Shanghai Jewish Refugees (Holocaust refugees during World War II), (2) the remnants of Jewish communities in China (the largest of which are in Tianjin, Harbin and Kaifeng) and (3) political studies on the Near East. Amongst the publications of the CJSS are “The Jews of China”, “The Jewish Civilization”, “The Revitalization of the Jewish People” and “Jews in China: Legends, History and New Perspectives”. The CJSS has organized several national as well as international academic conferences along with so-called Rickshaw Reunions (reunions of Holocaust refugees who survived the Holocaust in Shanghai). Since 2006 the CJSS receives each year an Austrian Holocaust Memorial Servant from the Austrian Service Abroad. The Austrian Holocaust Memorial Servants‘ duties include: organizing Holocaust-related educational events, assisting the CJSS’ staff with organizing exhibitions and academic conferences, as well as translation and publication work and maintaining the CJSS’ archive. Providing tours for visitors of the CJSS and the Shanghai Jewish Refugees Museum (former Ohel Moshe Synagogue).

- Nanjing - John Rabe and International Safety Zone Memorial Hall

The John Rabe and International Safety Zone Memorial Hall is one of the two Peace Service Partners of the Austrian Service Abroad. The Center was established to commemorate Rabe and his deep love of humanity, who saved over 600 Chinese refugees from the Japanese persecution. It is also intended to refresh people’s memories and let them learn about this chapter of Chinese history so that tragedies of this kind will never occur again. Moreover, the project is meant to promote world peace and humanitarianism everywhere, and to further develop friendly communications and cooperations among the Chinese people and other countries around the world. At the John Rabe House, the Peace Servant's main tasks are assistant and translation work, as well as self-dependent research and investigation. Furthermore, he or she aids in internal and external teamwork projects and in developing websites. Requirements for the Peace Service are good Chinese and English language skills, the ability to work self-dependent and to participate in international teamwork.

Costa Rica

- La Gamba - Tropical Field Station La Gamba

The biological station in La Gamba is an Austrian institution, which serves as a base for investigations for scientists from all over the world. Furthermore, the station started projects like the reforestation, the creation of environmental awareness and also projects to support the inhabitants. Our servants in La Gamba help to keep the station functional and collaborate in many of the named projects.

- Finca Sonador - Finca Sonador

Croatia

- Osijek - Centre for Peace, Nonviolence and Human Rights

Czech Republic

- Prague - Federation of Jewish Communities

France

- Oradour - Centre de la Mémoire d'Oradour
- Paris - La Fondation pour la Mémoire de la Déportation
- Paris - Amicale de Mauthausen The Amicale de Mauthausen is a French institution in memory of the Mauthausen concentration camp and its many subcamps. Founded in october 1945 by survivors of the Mauthausen concentration camp the Amicale de Mauthausen is present at the annual camp liberation ceremonies in Austria and organizes excursions for its members as well as for French high school students. The volunteers tasks include french-german translations of documents and assistance with the planning of excursions as well as the digitalization of the organizations archives.
- Strasbourg - Congress of the Council of Europe, European Alliance of Cities and Regions for Roma Inclusion

Gabon

- Lambaréné - Medical Research Unit, Albert Schweitzer Hospital

Georgia

- Tbilisi - Act for Transformation Caucasus Office

Germany

- Berchtesgaden - Dokumentation Obersalzberg

The Dokumentation Obersalzberg is a place of guided learning and remembrance designed by the Institut für Zeitgeschichte. At the Dokumentation Obersalzberg the Austrian Holocaust Memorial Servant works at the museum educational service. The main part of the work is the organisation of guided tours and workshops. He also gets the opportunity to create new educational material like workshops.

- Berlin - Jewish Museum Berlin
- Berlin - Ecumenical Memorial Centre Plötzensee - Christians and Resistance
- Cölbe - Terra Tech
- Moringen - Concentration Camp Memorial at Torhaus Moringen
- Munich - Jewish Museum Munich

Guatemala

- Santa Rosita - ASOL Casa Hogar

Hungary

- Budapest - Tom Lantos Institute

India

- Auroville - Auroville Action Group (AVAG)
- Dharamsala - Nishtha - Rural Health, Education and Environment Center
- Dharamsala - Tibetan Children´s Village
- Dharmshala - Tibetan Welfare Office
- Kochi - Mata Amritanandamayi Mission

Israel

- Jerusalem - St. Vincent-Ein Kerem
- Jerusalem - Yad Vashem
- Tel Aviv - Wiener Library for the Study of the Nazi Era and the Holocaust

Italy

- Milan - Centro di Documentazione Ebraica Contemporanea
- Prato - Museo della Deportazione
- Rome - Fondazione Museo della Shoah

Japan

- Hiroshima - Peace Culture Foundation

The Hiroshima Peace Memorial Museum exhibit presents the facts of the atomic bombing, with the aim of contributing to the abolition of nuclear weapons throughout the world, and to achieve the world peace. The main tasks of the Austrian Peace Servant at the Hiroshima Peace Culture Foundation is assistant and translation work, self-dependent research and investigation, as well as internal and external teamwork projects. Requirements for the Peace Servant are good Japanese language skills, very good English language skills and the abilities to work self-dependent and participate in international teamwork.

Madagascar

- Antalaha - D'Analalava

Mexico

- Mexico City - Museo Memoria y Tolerancia

Morocco

- Marrakesh - Atlas Foundation.org High Atlas Foundation

Netherlands

- The Hague - Bertha von Suttner Peace Institute
- The Hague - The Peace Palace
- Amsterdam - UNITED for Intercultural Action

The main part of the Austrian Holocaust Memorial Servant at UNITED is secretarial work, which includes assisting, translating documents, doing self dependent research and investigation, as well as organising internal and external teamwork-projects. The Servant is engaged with organising conferences, administrating databases, publishing reports and preparing future projects.

New Zealand

- Wellington - Holocaust Centre of New Zealand

Nicaragua

- Granada - Casa de los Tres Mundos

Pakistan

- Lahore - SOS SOS Children's Village Association
- Lahore - proLoka Pakistan

Peru

- Lima - The information and education centre for the prevention of drug abuse CEDRO

Poland

- Kraków -Judaica Foundation - Center For Jewish Culture
- Kraków - PAH Polska Akcja Humanitarna
- Kraków - Galicia Jewish Museum
- Oświęcim - Auschwitz Jewish Center

Russia

- Moscow - Russian Research and Educational Holocaust Center
- Saint Petersburg - GU SRZ Vera

Rwanda

- Kigali - Kigali Genocide Memorial

South Africa

- Cape Town - Cape Town Holocaust Centre
- Durban - Durban Holocaust and Genocide Centre
- Johannesburg - Johannesburg Holocaust and Genocide Centre

Sweden

- Stockholm - Forum för levande historia
- Uppsala - Uppsala Universitet

Switzerland

- Zurich - GAMARAAL Foundation

Turkey

- Kilis - Kareemat Merkez

Uganda

- Fort Portal - Mountains of the Moon University

Ukraine

- Kyiv - Jewish Foundation of Ukraine (JFU)

United Kingdom

- London - Royal London Society for the Blind
- London - The National Yad Vashem Charitable Trust
- London - Institute of Contemporary History and Wiener Library

United States

- Dayton - Dayton International Peace Museum
- Los Angeles - Simon Wiesenthal Center

The main part of the work of an Austrian Holocaust Memorial Servant at the Simon Wiesenthal Center is working as a tour guide in the Museum of Tolerance, which is the educational arm of the Simon Wiesenthal Center. These tour groups are mainly Middle School and High School students from the Los Angeles area, but also from further away. Besides from giving tours, the servant also helps out public visitors to the museum, helps with translations and interacts with Holocaust survivors as well.

- Los Angeles - Los Angeles Museum of the Holocaust

The Austrian Holocaust Memorial Servant at the Los Angeles Museum of the Holocaust serves as tour guide, facilitates seminars and lectures by survivor docents, and works with teachero schedule and coordinate tours. The volunteer interacts with Holocaust survivors, students, teachers and visitors to the Museum on a daily basis. The servant also works with primary documents and artifacts, which he translates, reviews and interprets.

- Los Angeles - USC Shoah Foundation Institute for Visual History and Education

The volunteer at "USC Shoah Foundation Institute" for Visual History and Education translates all types of different documents, from contracts to letters; he also helps to translate German terms or places which often appear in interviews with Holocaust Survivors. A main task for the Holocaust Servant is indexing German testimonies and maintaining the museum's database. Further, he helps the museum organizing different events like discussions or film screenings.

- New York - The World Jewish Congress
- New York - Museum of Jewish Heritage

At the Museum of Jewish Heritage, which tells the story of Jewish life before, during and after the Holocaust and also hosts galleries for special exhibitions, the Austrian Holocaust Memorial Servant works in the Collections & Exhibitions Department, where he is in charge of translating documents and other artifacts into English. Besides he listens to audio testimonies of Holocaust Survivors in either English or German and writes summaries, which are added to the museum's database. Further tasks include maintaining the database, guiding visitors, research and the installation of new exhibits.

- New York - Anti-Defamation League
- New York - American Jewish Committee
- Reno - Center for Holocaust, Genocide & Peace Studies
- Richmond - Virginia Holocaust Museum

The Virginia Holocaust Museum features 28 exhibitions including “The Ipson Saga,” which documents the story of Museum Director and Founder, Jay M. Ipson and his family from pre-war Lithuania, through their escape to liberation. The Nuremberg Trials Courtroom exhibition is the only existing replica of the famous courtroom that set the standard for modern international law. The tasks for the Austrian Holocaust Memorial Servant are manifold. Duties at the Virginia Holocaust Museum range from giving tours through the permanent exhibit to translations (German-English) to assisting in research or helping at the reception desk among other things.

- San Francisco - Holocaust Center of Northern California
- St. Petersburg - The Florida Holocaust Museum
- Chicago - Illinois Holocaust Museum and Education Center

The Austrian Holocaust Memorial Servants help in the administration, assist in education, event planning and museum tours. Furthermore, they are responsible for translations between German and English. After having received special training they will also guide groups through the museum.

== Austrian Holocaust Memorial Award ==
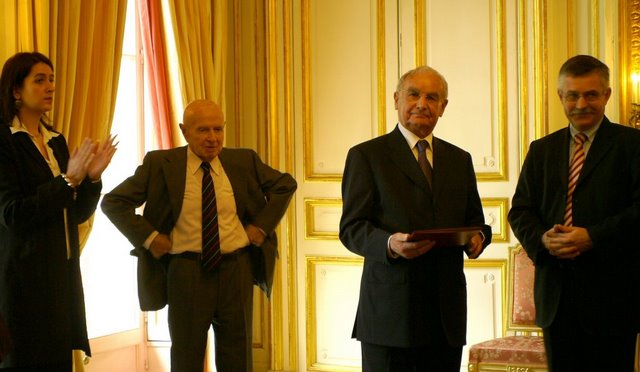
Reception at the Austrian Embassy in Paris for AHMA awardee Robert Hébras (March 2008)

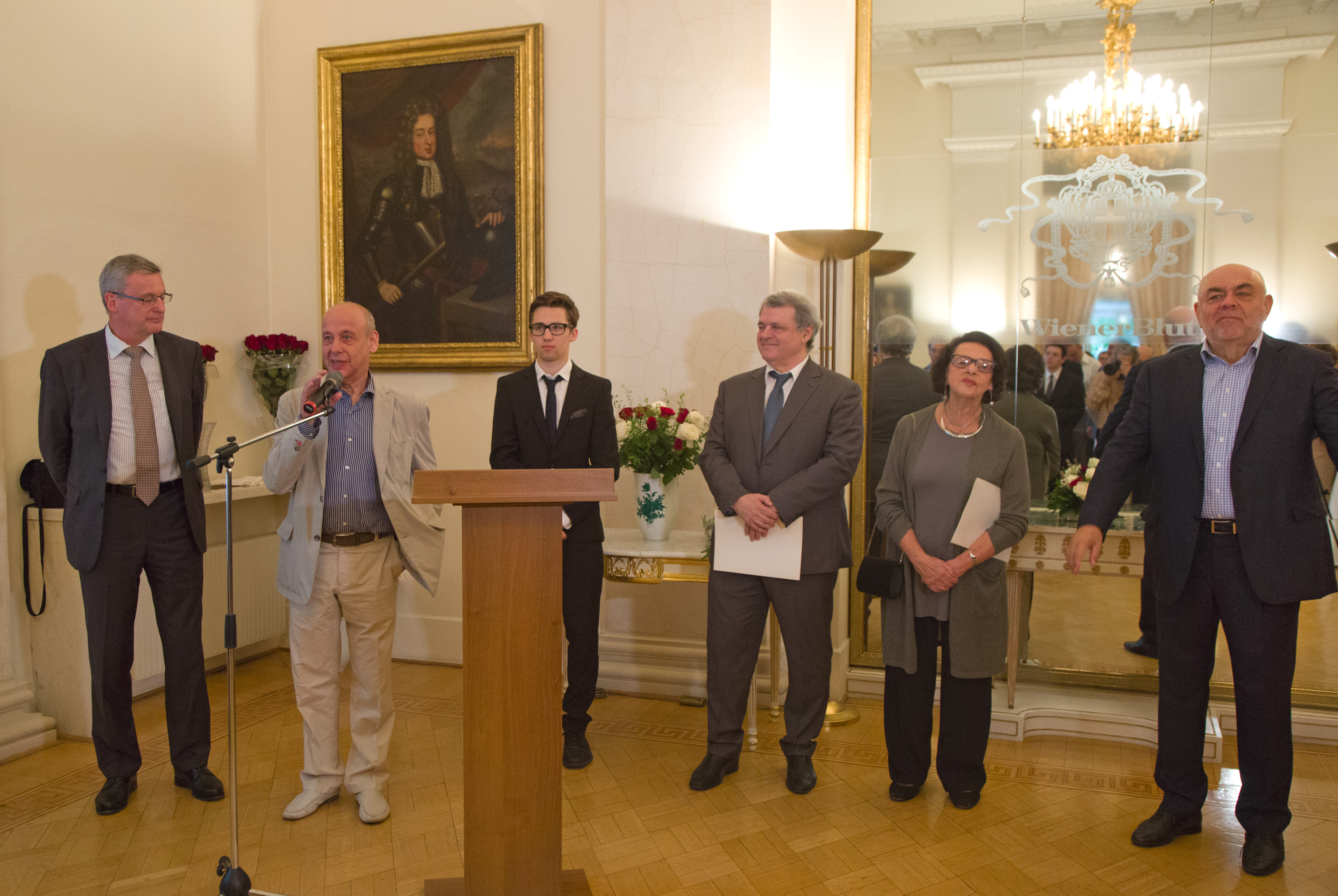
AHMA for Alla Gerber at the Austrian embassy in Moscow 2018

In 2006 Andreas Maislinger, chairman of the Austrian Service Abroad, initiated the Austrian Holocaust Memorial Award (AHMA). Winners:

- 2006: Pan Guang, Shanghai, China
- 2007: Alberto Dines, São Paulo, Brazil
- 2008: Robert Hébras, Oradour-sur-Glane, France
- 2009: Jay M. Ipson, Richmond, United States
- 2010: Eva Marks, Melbourne, Australia
- 2011: Auschwitz Jewish Center, Oświęcim, Poland
- 2012: Ladislaus Löb, United Kingdom
- 2013: Hugo Höllenreiner, Munich, Germany
- 2014: Marģers Vestermanis, Riga, Latvia
- 2015: Erika Rosenberg, Buenos Aires, Argentina
- 2016: Giorgio Frassineti, Predappio (Forlì), Italy
- 2017: Ruben Fuks, Belgrade, Serbia
- 2018: Alla Gerber and Ilya Altman, Moscow, Russia
- 2019: Tomislav Dulic, Uppsala, Sweden
- 2020: Dušan Stefančič, Ljubljana, Slovenia

== Austrian Servant Abroad of the Year ==
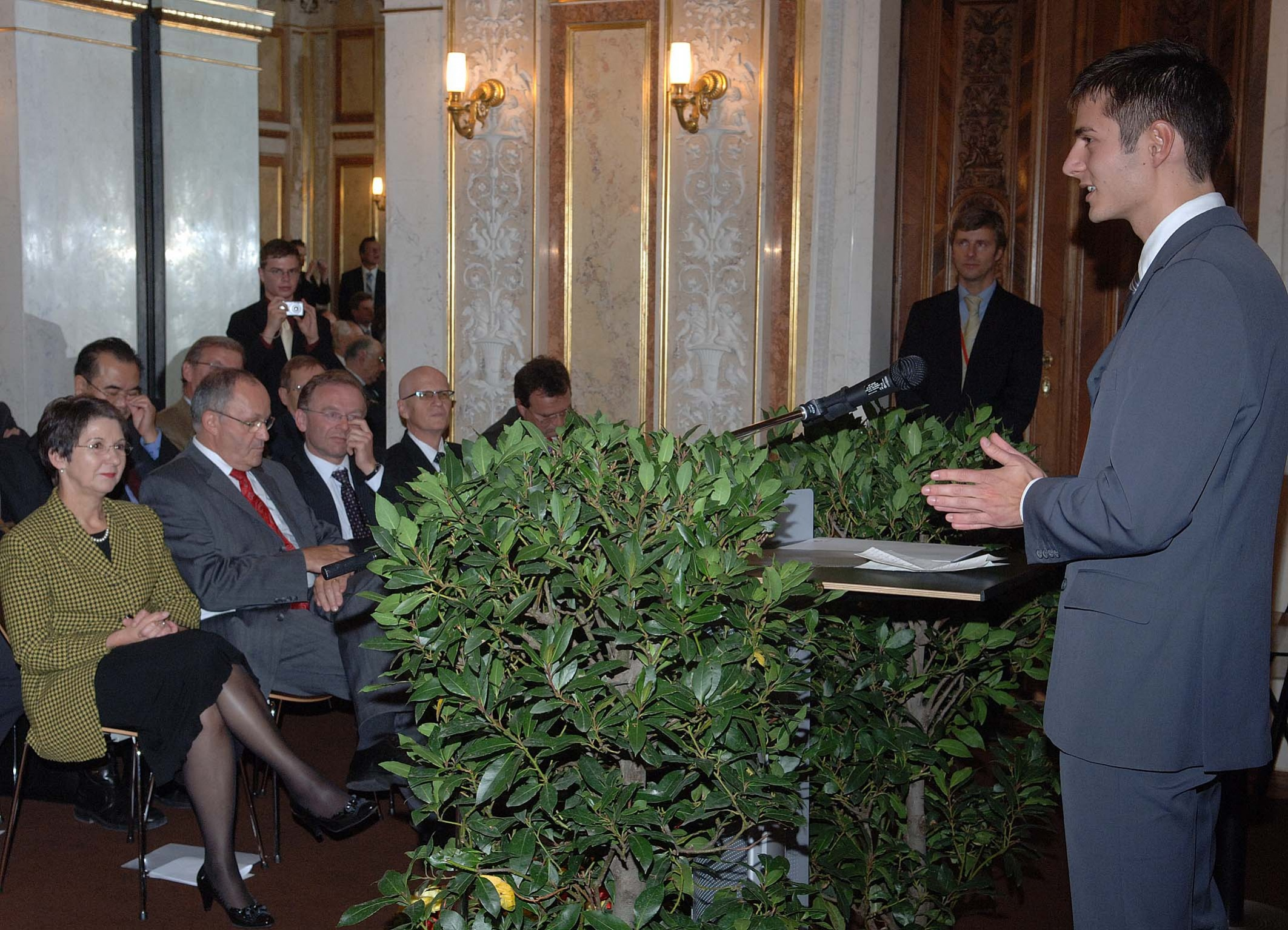
Austrian Servant Abroad of the year 2007 Daniel J. Schuster speaking at award ceremony in the Palais Epstein to the president of the Austrian parliament Mag. Barbara Prammer, Israeli ambassador to Austria Dan Ashbel, founder of the Austrian Service Abroad Andreas Maislinger, Australian ambassador to Austria Dr. Peter Shannon, Chinese ambassador to Austria Lu Yonghua, and former Austrian Minister of Interior Karl Schlögl (October 2007)

- 2004 Stefan Stoev, United States Holocaust Memorial Museum, Washington D.C., United States
- 2005 Dr. Andreas Daniel Matt, SOS Children's Villages Lahore, Pakistan
- 2006 Martin Wallner, Center of Jewish Studies Shanghai, China
- 2007 Daniel James Schuster, Yad Vashem Jerusalem, Israel
- 2008 René J. Laglstorfer, Centre de la mémoire d'Oradour, France & Center of Jewish Studies Shanghai, China
- 2009 Joerg Reitmaier, Auschwitz Jewish Center, Poland & Virginia Holocaust Museum, United States
- 2010 Peter Loibner, GU SRZ Vera, Russia
- 2011
  - Francesco Konigsberger, Federation of Jewish Communities, Czech Republic,
  - Cornelius Schwärzler, Russian Research and Educational Holocaust Center, Russia & Fondazione Museo della Shoa, Italy & Dokumentation Obersalzberg, Germany,
  - David Witzeneder, Tropical Field Station La Gamba & Finca Salvador, Costa Rica
- 2020
  - Jonathan Dorner, Holocaust Museum LA
  - Monika Messner, Na'amat Kindertagesstätte
- 2021
  - Florian Müller, Centre for Peace, Nonviolence and Human Rights, Kroatien & Hugo Valentin Centre, Schweden
  - Raphael Faul, Fondazione Centro di Documentazione Ebraica Contemporanea, Mailand & Haver Srbija, Serbien
  - Matthias Kralupper, Act for Transformation, Georgien & National Museum of Contemporary History, Slowenien
  - Haris Hadzimejlic, Centre de la Mémoire d’Oradour, Frankreich
  - Raffael Winkler, Tropenstation La Gamba, Costa Rica & Casa Estudiantil ASOL, Guatemala
- 2022
  - Tatjana Lang, Yad Vashem, Jerusalem, Israel
  - Marco Spieler, Tropenstation La Gamba, Costa Rica
  - Markus Mamadou Wane, Enda Graf Sahel, Dakar, Senegal
  - Teresa Dujmovits, Carnegie Foundation Friedenspalast, Den Haag, Niederlande
  - Dennis Miskić, Srebrenica Genocide Memorial, Potocari, Bosnien und Herzegowina
- 2023
  - David Ditlbacher, Fondation pour la mémoire de la déportation, Paris, Frankreich
  - Michaela Franjo, Centre for Peace, Non-violence and Human Rights Osijek, Kroatien
  - Dominik Hohla, Auroville Institute of Applied Technology (AIAT), Tamil Nadu, Indien
  - Noah Guilherme Plattner, Shung Ye Museum of Formosan Aborigines, Tapei, Taiwan und Le CegeSoma – Centre d ́Étude Guerre et Société, Brüssel, Belgien
  - Daniel Hackl, Holocaust Education and Genocide Prevention Foundation Montreal, Kanada
- 2024
  - Moritz Gemel, Capetown Holocaust and Genocide Centre, Südafrika
  - Philipp Auberger, The Azrieli Foundation, Kanada

== Ethical Foundation ==
The core concept underlying the initiative of the Austrian Service Abroad is the concept of responsibility. Hereby the initiative is guided by the ethics conceptualized by the Jewish philosopher Hans Jonas who defined the following supreme moral imperative: "Act so that the effects of your action are compatible with the permanence of genuine human life". By integrating the chronological dimensions of past, present and future, in addition to the totality of humanity and the full dimension of space, the Austrian Service Abroad is about supporting life in an ethical, sustainable, global, responsible and permanent manner.

== See also ==
- Austrian Holocaust Memorial Service
- Austrian Social Service
- Austrian Peace Service
- Austrian Holocaust Memorial Award
