= Ziegelman =

Ziegelman is a surname. Notable people with the surname include:

- Jane Ziegelman, American historian
- Gary Ziegelman, American singer
