= Illegal drug trade in Peru =

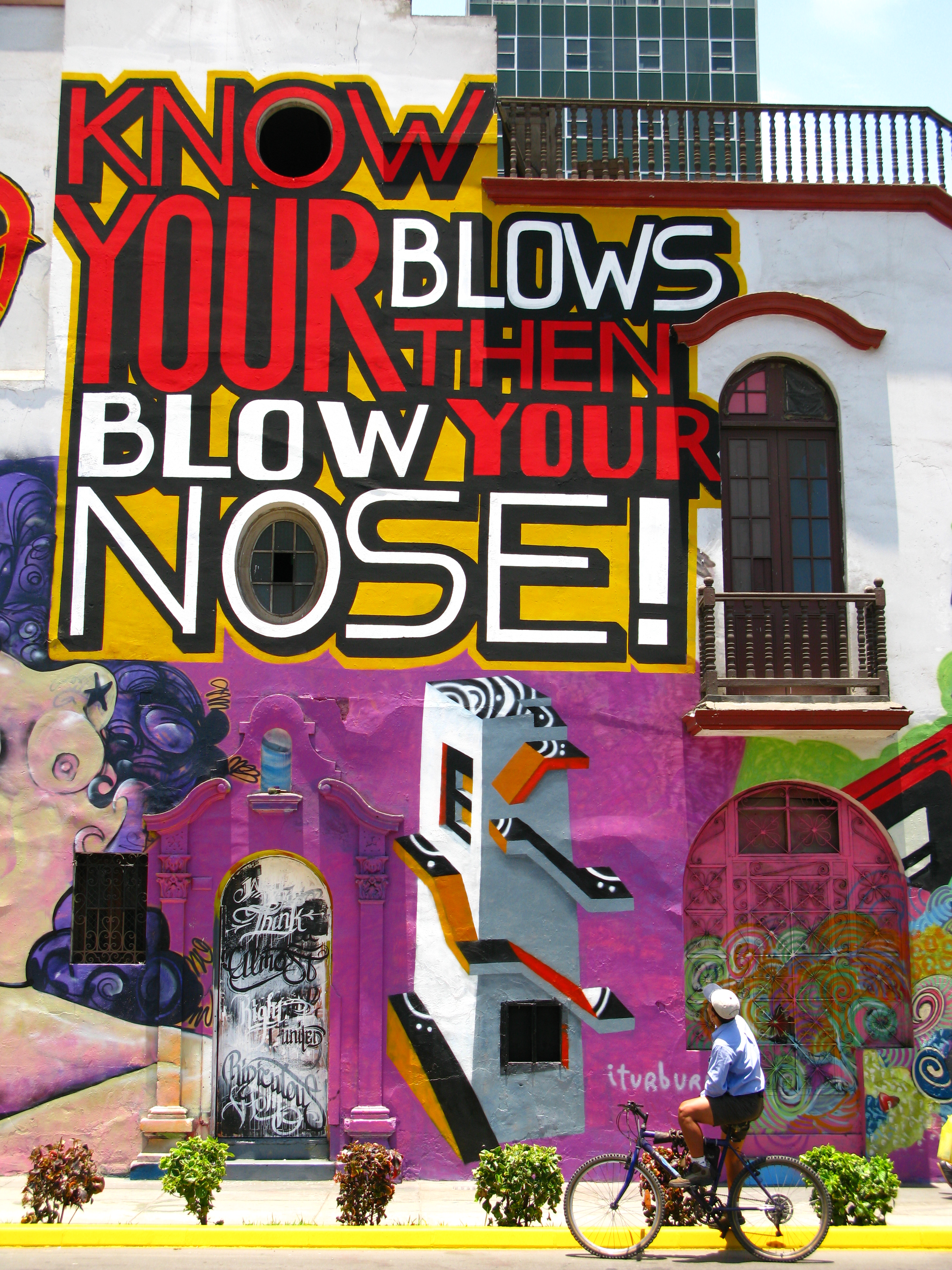
A site specific wordplay painting from "Above" in Lima, Peru commenting on the cocaine crisis and exportation

The illegal drug trade in Peru includes the growing of coca and the shipment of cocaine to the United States. In an example of the balloon effect, dramatic falls in coca cultivation in the late 1990s saw cultivation move to Colombia.

== Events ==
In 2001, American Christian missionary Roni Bowers's plane was shot down by the Peruvian Air Force, in the belief it was carrying drugs.

In 2004, Fernando Zevallos, founder of airline Aero Continente, was added to the US list of drug kingpins. The Chilean government accused the airline's personnel of using their airplanes for trafficking drugs and subsequently grounded Aero Continente Chile in June 2002 and seized their assets.

== See also ==
- Centro de Información y Educación para la Prevención del Abuso de Drogas
- Crime in Peru
- Drug trafficking in Peru
