= Eddy Wynschenk =

Eddy Wynschenk (July 18, 1927, Amsterdam, the Netherlands – December 16, 2003) was a Holocaust survivor who became renowned throughout the San Francisco Bay Area and beyond for sharing his story, frequently, at schools throughout Northern California. Before the Russian Army liberated Holocaust survivors from the Auschwitz death camp in January 1945, he was forced to go on a death march. During the march he suffered frostbite. Using scissors, nurses cut off his numb, frostbitten toes to save his life at the Dora-Nordhausen camp. Speaking to students, he got angry often, and often cried as well. But sharing his Holocaust story with students became his mission in life.

== Early life ==
Wynschenk was the youngest of four children whose father was a wholesale dealer in fruits and vegetables. When the Nazis occupied the Netherlands in 1940, Wynschenk’s father lost his business. Wynschenk was separated from the rest of his family after they were arrested in 1943. His two sisters were in hiding, but they turned themselves in after learning their younger brother was without his parents. His sisters did not survive. He arrived in the Westerbork transit camp in the Netherlands, alone, and then was deported to Auschwitz. Wynschenk never again saw any of his immediate family.

Wynschenk was put to work in Birkenau, the killing facility of Auschwitz. In a speech to the Holocaust Center of Northern California, Wynschenk later described how he was selected to work on the train platform where the Jews first arrived. After large transports of Hungarian Jews were forced off the trains, Wynschenk had to go aboard the cattle cars and empty them of whatever possessions the Jews had left behind, then load what was left behind onto trucks. Afterwards, he was selected to work in a coal mine in Furstengrubbe, an Auschwitz sub-camp.

As World War II drew to a close and Allied liberators closed in upon Auschwitz, Wynschenk was among thousands of prisoners forced from the camp and into a death march by the Nazis. The prisoners wended their way westward. After three days of trudging through freezing mud on their forced death march, and ten more days cramped among many other prisoners in an open convoy, the teenage Wynschenk's toes turned black from gangrene. He was not yet eighteen years old –and weighed a mere 75 pounds– at the end of World War II in 1945, when two nurses cut off his toes. No anesthetic was used, but Wynschenk was so numb that he did not feel anything. His toes were thrown into a fire. Afterwards, his unique gait became easily recognizable.

After liberation from the death camp, Wynschenk returned to the Netherlands, by which time his entire immediate family had been killed. He never graduated from high school. He married four years later, in 1949.

== Coming to America ==
In 1956, Wynschenk and his wife immigrated to the United States, first to Philadelphia, Pennsylvania, where he worked in a leather factory. The Wynschenks moved to the San Francisco Peninsula in 1957, had two children, and subsequently divorced. Wynschenk remarried, to a survivor of a Japanese concentration camp in Indonesia. Wynschenk worked in the insurance business.

== On a mission ==
Wynschenk never talked about his past, until after receiving a phone call in 1972 from a religious-school teacher. The teacher had discovered that Wynschenk was a Holocaust survivor from his son, Mike. Few Holocaust survivors were making their stories known at the time. The teacher asked the elder Wynschenk to speak to the class about his story, but he became angry instead, and promptly refused. But then he reconsidered. “He became determined for people to know his story and spoke to many, many schoolchildren over the years,” said Adrian Schrek, of the Holocaust Center of Northern California, “He touched many children over the years.”

Wynshenk received numerous letters from appreciative students who heard him, and many inviting him to speak. “I get goosebumps when I read them. I cry. The kids open up from deep inside. They touch me with their love, power, their strength.” In 1988, he was invited to a middle school in Galt, California, after a student there brought in a newspaper article about him. “Usually I get letters after I talk to schools,” he then told the Jewish Bulletin of Northern California, but the students had already written him more than a hundred letters. When he and his wife went to Galt, they were welcomed with a banner that said “Welcome, We Love You.”

Wynshenk was awarded an honorary high school diploma in 1989, from Earl Wooster High School in Reno, Nevada, where a month earlier his talk had held students spellbound for two hours.

In 1997, Wynschenk went to tell his story at a church in San Bruno, California, but was confronted by five Holocaust deniers who insisted his story was a hoax. But the audience would have none of it. “The kids stood up roaring, roaring, roaring. Eighty kids, as if on cue, stood up and said ‘Shut up, get out of here,’" according to Wynshenk. The crowd then began to chant, “Eddy, Eddy, Eddy,”

== Survivor's guilt ==
Wynschenk was haunted by survivor’s guilt, according to Louis de Groot of the Holocaust Center, who described him as “very scarred from his wartime experiences. There were very few people who understood him. He never was able to really conquer the damage that had been inflicted on him. He lived with a lot of guilt.” That his sisters came out of hiding on his account, only to be killed themselves, “was a very big burden that he carried,” de Groot said.

== Quote ==
“Whenever I talk about the Holocaust, I look to the sky, because that’s where the six million went.”

== See also ==
- American Gathering of Jewish Holocaust Survivors
- United States Holocaust Memorial Museum
