= SOS Hermann Gmeiner Technical School =

Chinese technical school

SOS Hermann Gmeiner Technical School Chinese: 格迈纳尔 职业 技术学校

Information
- Established: 1996; 29 years ago

The SOS Hermann Gmeiner Technical School (格迈纳尔 职业 技术学校 gé-mài-nà-ěr zhí-yè jì-shù- xué-xiào) is situated in Qiqihar, a city in Heilongjiang province, in the Northeast of China. Since its founding in 1996 the school focuses on two main learning fields: on the one hand on natural science and practical learning contents such as handcraft, on the other hand on language-teaching, especially on English lessons. It is named after Austrian philanthropist Hermann Gmeiner.

It is a vocational school according to the Western model. But its pedagogical principle places emphasis on social values because the school is connected to the local SOS Children's Village whose inhabitants have the possibility of free education.

== See also ==
- Austrian Service Abroad
- Austrian Social Service
