= Vida Nueva =

Vida Nueva may refer to:

== Periodicals ==
- Vida Nueva (es:Vida Nueva), defunct Spanish literary magazine
- Vida Nueva (ca:Vida Nueva), Catholic periodical started in Spain
- Vida Nueva, (:es:Vida nueva) Spanish trade union magazine
- Vida Nueva, The Tidings
- Vida Nueva, Chihuahua periodical Francisco Lagos Cházaro

== Organisations ==
- Via Nueva, Costa Rican NGO supported by Austrian Social Service

== Music ==
- Vida Nueva (Los Freddy's album)
- Vida Nueva, album by Funky 2007
- "Vida Nueva", song by Río Roma composed by José Luis Roma
- "Vida Nueva", song by Reyli Barba composed by R. Barba

== See also ==
- Nueva Vida (disambiguation)
