= Stephen Roth Institute =

Research institute at Tel Aviv University, Israel

Coordinates: 32°6′43.51″N 34°48′17.45″E

The Stephen Roth Institute for the Study of Contemporary Antisemitism and Racism is a research institute at Tel Aviv University in Israel.

It is a resource for information, provides a forum for academic discussion, and fosters research on issues concerning antisemitic and racist theories and manifestations. The institute's principal focus is the social and political exploitation of these phenomena in the period since the end of World War II, and the influence of their historical background.

== Details ==
The institute was founded as the Project for the Study of Anti-Semitism in the fall of 1991, and was headed by Prof. Dina Porat of Tel Aviv University until 2010. Since then, Dr. Scott Ury of Tel Aviv University's Department of Jewish History has been Director of the Roth Institute. The institute is situated within Tel Aviv University's Faculty of the Humanities and is associated with the Wiener Library for the Study of the Nazi Era and the Holocaust in Tel Aviv, home of one of the world's richest collections of documents related to fascist regimes and movements, and antisemitism. The Institute welcomes visitors and fosters cooperation with universities and research institutes outside Israel.
