= Yizkor books =

Holocaust memorial books

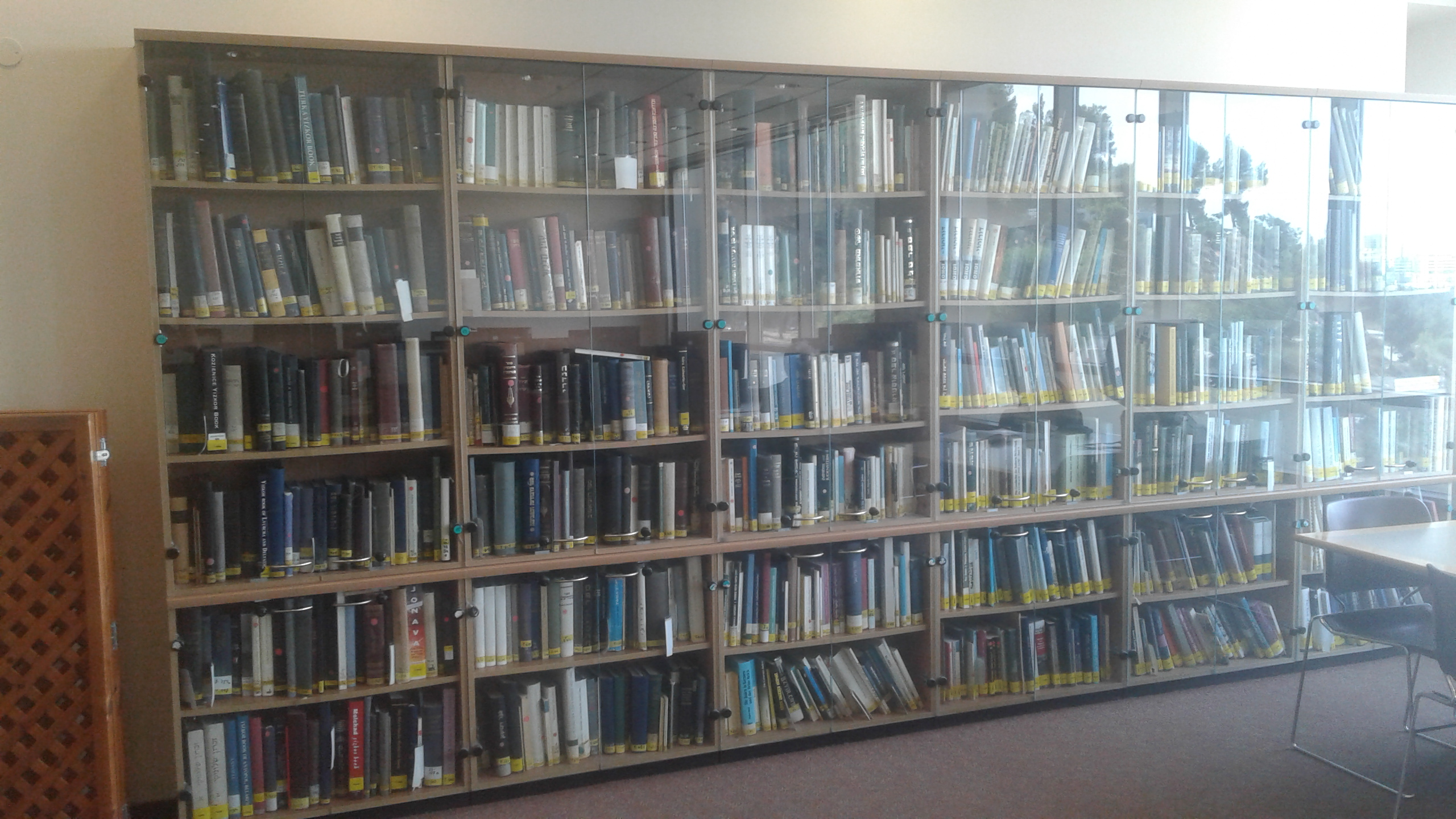
A part of the Yizkor books' shelves at the reading room at Yad Vashem library

Yizkor books (Yiddish: יזכור־בּוך, romanized: Yizkor-bukh, plural: יזכור־בּיכער, Yizkor-bikher) are memorial books commemorating a Jewish community destroyed during the Holocaust. The books are published by former residents or landsmanshaft societies as remembrances of homes, people and ways of life lost during World War II. Yizkor books usually focus on a town but may include sections on neighboring smaller communities.

Most of these books are written in Yiddish or Hebrew, some also include sections in English or other languages, depending on where they were published.

Since the 1990s, many of these books, or sections of them have been translated into English, digitized, and made available online.

== History ==
The publication of Yizkor books was one of the earliest ways in which the Holocaust was communally commemorated. A memorial book about the Jewish community of Łódź was produced in New York City in 1943. It was the first of more than 900 of this type that were subsequently published. More of these books began to appear in the mid to late 1940s and were usually published privately rather than by publishing companies.

Voluntary societies and welfare services of the various European Jewish communities, called landsmanshaften, usually took the lead in publishing them for their members who shared a common regional origin, history and culture.

The first Yizkor books were published in the United States, mainly in Yiddish, the mother tongue of most of the members of the landsmanschaften and Holocaust survivors. Beginning in the 1950s, after the immigration of large numbers of Holocaust survivors to the newly independent State of Israel, most of the Yizkor books were published there, between the mid-1950s and the mid-1970s, and mainly, but not exclusively, in Hebrew. From the late 1970s, the number of collective memorial books published declined, but this was offset by the publication of an increasing number of Holocaust survivors' personal stories and memoirs.

In total, about three-quarters of all the Yizkor books were ultimately published in Israel, and more than 60% of the total are in Hebrew.

== Collections and translations ==
Most Yizkor books were published in very limited quantities, and are therefore usually difficult to find and expensive to purchase. However, there have been a number of projects to collect and preserve these publications, digitize their contents and translate them into English, and make them available online:

Large collections of Yizkor books are housed at Yad Vashem in Jerusalem, the Library of Congress in Washington, D.C., the Jewish Theological Seminary and Yeshiva University in New York, University of California, Los Angeles, the Holocaust Center of Northern California in San Francisco, Harvard and Brandeis universities near Boston, the Price Library of Judaica at the University of Florida, Gainesville, the Jewish Public Library of Montreal, and the Jewish Documentation and Research Center of Mexico.

YIVO Institute for Jewish Research, and the New York Public Library in New York City, and the National Yiddish Book Center at Amherst, Massachusetts, have physical copies of the books as well as publicly accessible online repositories.

The Jewish family history website, JewishGen, established a Yizkor Book Project in 1994 to make the contents of Yizkor books more accessible to researchers, historians and genealogists by translating them into English and compiling an index of names of Holocaust victims memorialized, or others who are mentioned, in the books. The site also contains a bibliographic database of locations and libraries with Yizkor book holdings worldwide and includes call numbers for over 50 libraries.

Her 2026 book, Once There Was a Town: The Memory Books of a Lost Jewish World Jane Ziegelman describes Yizkor books and the memory of her family of the extermination of the Jewish population of Liuboml by the Nazis in 1942.

== See also ==
- Memorbuch
