= Unaproa =

UNAPROA (Unión de Amigos para la Protección del Ambiente) was founded by deputies of six village communities in the Brunca Region in the year 1995. This association has the ambition of promoting the organic agriculture and green tourism. Its domicile is situated in El General in Costa Rica. The members are mostly campesinos, who husband small fields at the Talamanca mountains. Meanwhile the community has grown and now embraces deputies of forty villages, one of them indigenous. UNAPROA has cooperated for several years with the Austrian magazine Grünen Bildungswerkstatt.

== See also ==
- Austrian Service Abroad
- Austrian Social Service
