= Austrian Social Service =

The Austrian Social Service (Österreichischer Sozialdienst) is part of the Austrian Service Abroad founded by Dr. Andreas Maislinger in 1998. It offers the possibility to substitute the compulsory military service in Austria with a 10-months service abroad and provides a platform for volunteering services.

== Legal framework ==
As part of the Austrian Service Abroad the Austrian Social Service is funded and supervised by the Austrian Ministry of Social Affairs and subject to the federal law for the promotion of voluntary engagement (Bundesgesetz zur Förderung von freiwilligem Engagement.)

== Mission and structure ==
The Austrian Social Service supports socially vulnerable groups and the social and economic development of its host country. Austrian social service volunteers are deployed in various kinds of partner organizations in a large number of countries. The focus lies on the developing world.

== Assignments ==
The Austrian Social Servants work in the fields of education, care, medical support, agriculture and economic development for street or homeless children, elderly, handicapped, ill, poor and/or marginalized people. Furthermore, also the field of environmental protection belongs to the Austrian Social Service, partnering with organizations engaged in projects for the protection and sustenance of the natural environment.

Since 2018 the Austrian Service Abroad also partakes in the program Understanding Israel, sending young Austrians to do social service at child-care places and handicapped-care facilities in the state of Israel in cooperation with the Israeli Volunteer Association.

== Partners ==
Argentina

- Buenos Aires – Center for homeless children and adolescents

Belarus

- Minsk – Belarusian Children's Hospice
- Minsk – 'Dietski dom no. 6' – Kinderheim no. 6
- Minsk – Kindergarten for Children with Special Needs

Belgium

- Brussels – European Disability Forum

Bosnia and Herzegovina

- Sarajevo – Phoenix Initiative

Brazil

- Alagoinhas – Associacao Lar Sao Benedito
- Lauro de Freitas – Community Centre Christ Liberator
- Rio de Janeiro – Center for Justice and International Law (CEJIL)

China

- Qiqihar – China SOS Children's Village Association Beijing, Qiqihar City, Helongjiang Province and Yantai City, Shandong Province

Costa Rica

- La Gamba – Tropical Field Station La Gamba
- Puntarenas – Finca Sonador - Asociaicón de Cooperativas Europeas Longo Mai
- Puntarenas – Union de Amigos para la Protección del Ambiente (Unaproa)
- San Isidro – Asociación Vida Nueva

Czech Republic

- Prague – The Jewish community of Prague

Germany

- Marburg – Terra Tech

Gabon

- Lambaréné – Medical Research Unit, Albert Schweitzer Hospital

Guatemala

- Quetzaltenango – Instituto de Formacion e Investigacion Municipal
- Santa Rosita – Casa Hogar Estudiantil ASOL

India

- Auroville – Auroville Action Group (AVAG)
- Dharmshala – Nishtha, Rural Health, Education and Environment Centre
- Dharmshala – Tibetan Children's Village:*Dharmshala - Tibetan Welfare Office
- Kerala – Mata Amritanandamayi Mission

Israel

- Jerusalem – St. Vinzenz-Ein Karem
- Understanding Israel

Kenya

- Nairobi – Kenya Water for Health Organisation (KWAHO)

Nicaragua

- Granada – Fundación Casa de los tres mundos
- León – Campo Recreativo MILAVF

Norway

- Oslo – Jodisk Aldersbolig

Pakistan

- SOS children villages Pakistan Karachi, Sialkot, Dodhial, Faisalabad, Sargodha, Lahore, Rawalpindi and Multan

Peru

- Huancayo – Unidad Territorial de Salud Daniel Alcides Carrión
- Lima – The information and education centre for the prevention of drug abuse (CEDRO)

Poland

- Kraków – Polska Akcja Humanitarna

Romania

- Iaşi – The hope of Romanian children

Russia

- Moscow – Together For Peace (TFP)
- Moscow – Centre for social development and self-help "perspective"

Uganda

- Fort Portal – Mountains of the Moon University (MMU)
- Kabale – Diözese Kabale – Bishops House

United Kingdom

- London – Royal London Society for the Blind

United States

- New York – Gay Men's Health Crisis
