= Bay Area Holocaust Oral History Project =

The Bay Area Holocaust Oral History Project (BAHOHP) was an organization that gathered oral life histories of Holocaust survivors, liberators, rescuers, and eyewitnesses to the Holocaust. Its goal was to develop and maintain a catalogue database for public use, to provide students, scholars, resource centers on the world, and the general public access to their archives.

BAHOHP sought to counteract Holocaust denial, hate crimes, and antisemitism through recorded personal testimony.

BAHOHP merged with the Holocaust Center of Northern California (HCNC) to form a single organization under that name.

== The collection ==
Lani Silver and R. Ruth Linden* founded the Holocaust Media Project, predecessor of the Bay Area Holocaust Oral History Project, in 1983. They co-directed the project until 1985. Silver was executive director from 1985 to 1997. Since then, the project has been headed by Anne Grenn Saldinger. Today, the project has some 1700 audio and video recordings of survivors, witnesses and children of survivors. In addition, the collection contains close to a thousand transcripts and other materials.

- Shapiro, Eleanor, "Interviewing Survivors Stirs Author's Identity Issues," Jewish Bulletin of Northern California, November 26, 1993; Linden, R. Ruth, "Making Stories, Making Selves: Feminist Reflections on the Holocaust." Columbus, OH: Ohio State University Press, 1993 [A Helen Hooven Santmyer Prize Winner].

== Interviews ==
BAHOHP gathers a complete life story of the interviewee, focusing on details surrounding the Holocaust. The questions will vary according to the specific experiences of each individual. The interviewer has an advanced degree in psychology or social work and experience conducting survivor interviews.

BAHOHP keeps a copy of each tape and sends the master and a duplicate copy to the United States Holocaust Memorial Museum in Washington, D.C. In addition, the interviewee is given a copy of his or her interview at the conclusion of the taping. R. Ruth Linden, Ph.D. donated copies of the original archives (1981–1984) to Yad Vashem, the Holocaust Martyrs' and Heroes' Remembrance Authority in Jerusalem, on 7 September 2007 through the Israeli Consulate in San Francisco.

BAHOHP has agreed to record the memories of SPK, AK, and Warsaw Uprising veterans.

== Examples of oral testimonies ==
- Helen Farkas was born in Romania, as Helen Safa. She remembers the Hungarian occupation and growth of anti-Semitism very clearly. She was part of the death march, yet made a heroic escape. Helen married her pre-war fiance and left Romania shortly before it came under communist rule. Helen later moved into the San Francisco Bay Area and spent much of her time educating about the Holocaust.
- Hurst Sommer is a Holocaust survivor. A German Jew, he escaped Germany with his family in 1938 to Shanghai, China, where he spent World War II in a Japanese internment camp.
- Max Drimmer and Herman Shine were both born in Berlin and knew each other as small children. In 1939 they were both sent to Sachsenhausen, a concentration camp close to Berlin. Their lives remained intertwined as they survived and escaped the horrific realities of the Holocaust.
- Gloria Hollander Lyon was born in 1930 in Nagy Bereg, Czechoslovakia, where her family owned a store. In 1938 Jews were forced to close all businesses. Gloria spent time in a local ghetto before being deportation to Auschwitz. While there, she was selected for the gas chamber, but escaped by jumping out of the truck. After several camps she was finally liberated. Gloria resides in San Francisco and is an active Holocaust educator.
- Oskar Klausenstock was born in Ciesezin, a small town in Poland. He was 17 years old when the war started. His memories of the Holocaust are from a teenager's perspective. He is also a poet whose poetry draws on his memories.
