= Finca Sonador =

Coordinates: 9°13′39″N 83°22′59″W

The Finca Sonador project was launched in 1979 to provide a home for Nicaraguan refugees. Salvadorians followed in 1982 and now there are about 700 Salvadorians, Nicaraguans and Costa Ricans living in the village of Longo Mai in Costa Rica. The village, which comprises a school, two shops, two churches and a great sense of community, is developing into a point of interest for many visitors. Biologists and others research the rainforest, archaeologists study rock paintings and other remains of the land’s earliest inhabitants and others teach, work on the field or simply learn how to bake a tortilla. The village hosts educational groups and individuals who do community service projects, take Spanish classes and learn from locals about history and culture of the region. “Finca Sonador” is a multinational experiment that has proven successful for almost three decades.

== See also ==
- Austrian Service Abroad
- Austrian Social Service
- Longo Mai
