= Nueva Vida =

Nueva Vida may refer to:

== Places ==
- Nueva Vida, Calakmul Municipality, Mexico
- Nueva Vida, Pichilemu, Chile

== Broadcasting ==
- Radio Nueva Vida Christian radio network

== Music ==
- Nueva Vida, album by Las Chicas del Can
- Nueva Vida, album by Sergio Dalma 2001
- Nueva Vida, EP by Ojos de Brujo
- "Nueva Vida" (Peso Pluma song)
- "Nueva Vida", song by Ojos de Brujo

== See also ==
- Vida Nueva (disambiguation)
