= Centro de Información y Educación para la Prevención del Abuso de Drogas =

Centro de Información y Educación para la Prevención del Abuso de Drogas (CEDRO) (Spanish for: information- and education-centre for prevention of drug abuse) is a private non-profit institution in Lima which was established by Peruvians in 1986. CEDRO focuses on working with street children, because these are in danger of drug abuse. For this purpose CEDRO has its own shelter for children in Lima.

Further objectives and working methods are:

- To educate the population about drug abuse and its consequences (in the form of attendance at masses, lectures and also workshops).
- Especially to protect endangered groups from drugs, e.g. street children by offering recreational activities such as music-courses, drawing-courses, sporting events or language-courses.

Since 2002, Austrian peace workers from the Austrian Association for Service Abroad have been working at CEDRO.

== See also ==
- Illegal drug trade in Peru
