= Jane Ziegelman =

American writer

Jane Ziegelman is director of the culinary program at the Lower East Side Tenement Museum in New York City and author of 97 Orchard: An Edible History of Five Immigrant Families and Foie Gras: A Passion.

Her 2010 book 97 Orchard is about Jewish, Irish, German, Russian and Italian people living together in a tenement building on Orchard Street in Manhattan's Lower East Side between 1863 and 1936. The book was published by HarperCollins. The Lower East Side Tenement Museum is located at 97 Orchard.

In 2016, Ziegelman and her husband, Andrew Coe, publisher A Square Meal: A Culinary History of the Great Depression, a history of the deprivations of Americans during the Great Depression.

Her 2026 book, Once There Was a Town: The Memory Books of a Lost Jewish World describes yizkor books and the memory of her family of the extermination of the Jewish population of Liuboml by the Nazis in 1942.
