= Organised crime in Peru =

Organised crime in Peru refers to the transnational, national, and local groupings of highly centralised enterprises run by criminals who engage in illegal activity in the country, including drug trafficking organisations, terrorism, and attempted murder.

== Gangs ==
Flag of the Shining Path

Founded in 1969, Shining Path is a Peruvian revolutionary organisation that supports a Maoism ideology. It is also known as Sendero Luminoso. The revolutionary organisation's aim is to replace the political system of Peru, not to influence it. The organisation provides protection to narcotics trade and makes use of their profits to strengthen their organisation and bring in more weaponry for security. In 2008, former jailed members of Sendero Luminoso and other supporters of the Shining Path established an organisation, MOVADEF, following the aim of Abimael Guzman, the former leader of Shining Path. MOVADEF continued to disseminate the ideology of their founder, Guzman, into remote villages in the Upper Huallaga Valley.

Balarezo Gang is a group of Peruvian smugglers which gradually emerged in the 1940s as cocaine trade became illegal. The gang consists of Balerzo and his six accomplices, who started exporting cocaine illegally in 1946. Balerzo lived in New York, expanding his smuggling business and owned a mansion on Long Island.

Barrio King, led by Gerson Gálvez Calle, is based in Callao and is known as Peru's largest drug ring. The criminal organisation had control over shipping centres to facilitate drug trafficking and was responsible for the many deaths in Peru.

== Prominent Individuals ==
- Abimael Guzmán is the former leader of Shining Path, partaking in activities against the Peruvian government.
- David Bazan Arevalo was the mayor of Tocache, Peru. He was investigated as a member of a drug trafficking operation, organising the production and trading of narco-trafficking.
- Andrés A. Soberón was the boss of Huanauco's cocaine industry. Soberón led cocaine makers during anti-cocaine law in 1947, and sent operatives and chemists into Bolivia.
- Gerson Gálvez Calle, also known as Caracol or Snail, led the drug trafficking organisation group called Barrio King. He was also called the new Joaquín "El Chapo" Guzmán by the Peruvian media for being capable of competing against Mexico drug trafficking organisations. Calle was released 12 years into a 15-year prison sentence, and has been a wanted man for murder, robbery, and drug trafficking.

== Activities ==
=== Drug Trafficking ===
==== Cocaine ====
Coca is an easy and profitable crop that farmers can grow with limited amounts of land. Cocaine started in eastern Peru in 1948 to 1949, and has been rapidly expanding domestic cocaine production, making it the world's second largest cocaine producer, after Colombia. Cocaine began as a major product for the Americans at the beginning of the Cold War, and the production of cocaine from Peru emerged during anti-communist regimes. Throughout the late 1940s, the cocaine industry was legal with minimal production from run down factories, however, by 1950, cocaine was being smuggled out of eastern Peru, and cities in Peru such as Uchiza District, Tingo María and Pucallpa. In 1949, Time nicknamed cocaine as "Peru's White Goddess." Initially, coca was not the main problem for Peru; however, advancements in technology and science turned it into a drug, by processing coca into cocaine for various purposes, such as medicine or wine. During the mid-1950s, cocaine export was pushed to La Paz, Bolivia. By the 1970s, the lack of supervision over cocaine trade enabled the growth of criminal networks centred on its trafficking.

With little police presence, Santa Rosa became an ideal route through which to smuggle cocaine to Brazil or Colombia. Weak state influence further allowed cocaine establishments to build coca fields, pits and labs. Most cocaine labs were situated in the jungle between the Putumayo and the River Amazon, and Caballococha became a gathering location for drug traffickers and producers.

==== Norco/Narco Trafficking ====
In 1986, the term "narco terrorism" was used in Peru as the relationship between drug traffickers and revolutionists. Peru is becoming a narco-trader for four continents. David Bazan Arevalo was investigated as an alleged member of a drug trafficking organisation. He has been indicted for being a member of a criminal organisation that trafficked drugs from coca-producing valley of Alto Huallaga to Colombia during the 1980s and 1990s.

=== Violence ===
==== Sexual assault ====
Peru is one of the many countries that followed the Marry-your-rapist law, which refers to as the exemption from punishment for a rapist by marrying their victims. The case of Peruvian ex-soldiers 'systematically' raping nine female farmers between 1984 and 1995 during the Shining Path guerrilla war was presented to the Truth and Reconciliation Commission in 2003, and the gang rape led to five of the women being pregnant.

==== Terrorism ====
The absence of government authority meant that the officials were underestimating Sendero Luminoso. Sendero Luminoso members communicate to the public through violent acts, such as going after essential power plants including water supplies or power grids. Rather than gaining support from the general public, destroying supply systems acts as no more than messages and symbols. The organisation was also initially involved in education at a university, in the training school department. In 1975, Sendero Luminoso appealed to double the school budget but the request was denied. As a result of their request being denied, Sendero Luminoso turned towards vandalism. In 1980, Sendero Luminoso declared war against the Peruvian government by burning ballot boxes that was going to be used in the first democratic election in Peru. The Shining Path operating in the Huallaga River region since the 1980s was financed and supplied weapons by David Bazan Arevalo. The criminal organisation took 71 hostages and attacked oil installations in Peru, as well as ambushing a police patrol and killing eight officials. Arevalo was part of a 2007 terrorist attack that resulted in the murder of a public prosecutor and three police officers in Tocache, which is known as one of the most crime-plagued regions of Peru.

=== Conservation criminology ===
==== Wildlife markets ====
The species diversity covers twenty times more land area, home to at least three endemic bird species and primate species in Andean forests. Wild animals in Peru are used for various reasons, including biomedical research, jewellery, and souvenirs. Pets are also products for sale involving live species such as parrots, monkeys, and tortoises found in Peru traded to Amazonas. The wild parrot trade in Peru, such as the Macaw, is localised in inter cities or cross-border trading between two countries. Parrots are poached because they are easy to capture and are abundant. Abundant populations of bears and monkeys in Peru are also poached for biomedical research; around 4,000 primates were trafficked for malaria research into Colombia.

The Ministry of Production, which is responsible for protecting endangered species have been caught illegally facilitating shark fin trade. Peru has become the third largest exporter of shark fin in the world, where the majority of shark fins are trafficked to China, as there is a high demand for shark fins in Asian markets.

==== Deforestation ====
Birds, amphibians, and ferns are examples of the biodiversity in eastern Peru which help constitute floristic assemblage. Cocaine cultivation attributes to the deforestation, mainly in the Huallaga Valley, and therefore, large groups of plant species are threatened by deforestation, and remaining forests are likely to lose species diversity.

Peru has one of the highest export of Swietenia macrophylla, driven by international demand. Lists of trees that do not actually need to be cut down or do not exist are given to authorities provided by criminal organisations, resulting in illegal loggers a permit by the authorities. Peruvian timber is exported to many countries, with the majority to countries such as China, the United States, Australia, Israel, and Puerto Rice, and involves tax evasion. The main port for timber exports in Peru is Callao. The Organismo de Supervision de los Recursos Forestales y de Fauna Silvestre was established as an anti-corruption organisation to prevent illegal deforestation activities in Peru, however, that has not stopped the act of illegal logging. According to the Center for International Environmental Law, more than 90 percent of timber sold in Peru was illegally obtained.

== Efforts to Reduce Organised Crimes ==
=== Political decentralisation ===
Armed forces and police in Peru cooperated together in capturing any Sendero Luminoso members and punished the captured criminal organisation followers with violence such as torture, execution or interrogations involving abuse. Through interrogations, the police were able to investigate Sendero Luminoso better. In 2001, the La Comisión de la Verdad y Reconciliación (CVR) was established to conduct analysis and studies of human violations by investigating assassinations, sexual violence, and torture of Peruvian civilians. The project was able to collect more than 16,000 testimonies from victims and witnesses, and aired on radios and national television as an act to raise awareness about violence and human rights.

The Peruvian government expanded their focus in Mantaro river in 2012, as the valley is known to be a trafficking route for cocaine and other drugs, to investigate the Shining plans to extend their control over narco-trafficking routes in La Convención. In February 2012, the Peruvian government captured Artemio, the leader of a faction in Sendero Luminoso in the Upper Huallaga Valley, which led to the dismantling of the military and weaponry in Sendero Luminoso.

The increase of drug usage in United States and Western Europe led to more drug production for Peruvian farmers selling at a higher price in the 1970s. In the 1980s, the U.S drug policy towards Peru was used as a plan to prevent cocaine production for their people, which brought devastating results to the economy in Peru. Under the pressure of the U.S drug policy, the Peruvian government proceeded towards the removal of cocaine production and focused on substituting the drug with other crops. As drug production in Peru decreased, Peruvian farmers lost their jobs.

On July 26, 2017, David Bazán Arévalo was arrested by Peru's counter-narcotics police. Lima office of the US Drug Enforcement Administration (DEA), the Peruvian Counternarcotics Directorate (Dirreción Nacional Antidrogas- DIRANDRO) arrested David Bazan Arevalo, targeting drug traffickers who financed narco-terrorist groups. The cocaine boom in the late 1990s came to an end when the Peruvian Air Force and DEA carried out tighter protection networks.

Balarezo was arrested in 1949 while he was on a boat to Italy, and took less than a month to receive a five-year sentence and $10,000 fine. 13 kilos of pure cocaine smuggled by Balarezo was found in New York, with $154,000 worth per kilo.

=== Social initiatives ===
Artemio was arrested to counter terrorism, which enabled the state security forces to enter regions to take action against terrorism. From 2005 to 2011, the Control y Reducción del Cultivo de la Coca en el Alto Huallaga was engaged in regional coca eradication campaigns.

Armed civilians in Peru organise their own protection and security, such as the Comités de Autodefensa (CADS), which coordinated the community for self-defence.

Community conservation of ecosystems and species by local people manage and enforce their own regulations, however, socio-political problems sometimes hinder creation of reserves for private land protection. Full cooperation from the majority of the community conservation is needed to from community leaders, which is two-thirds of the whole congregation. A two-year ban was promoted to restrict hunting of rodents such as the Agouti, and the use of slingshots toys by children was banned to recover bird and arboreal mammal populations.

Local Peruvians in communal organisations have provided environmental education and have controlled and reduced land invasion, from threats of climate change and to promote a harmonious relationship with nature. Loggers in Peru are required legitimate permit by the Organismo de Supervision de los Recursos Forestales y de Fauna Silvestre organisation if they wish to declare timber locations to cut down trees; however, the process is sometimes corrupt, involving compensation, and bribery.
