= GU SRZ Vera =

GU SRZ Vera The social rehabilitation center for minors GU SRZ Vera (ru: Социально-реабилитационный Центр для несовершеннолетних детей "ВЕРА") is a social organization, which tries to reintegrate Russian children on the margins of St. Peterburgian society. The organization GU SRZ Vera attempts to give children out of problem families (alcohol and drug abuse, violence, abuse, neglection...) and street children a new home. The children live in the organization's families together with special helpers, who really care for them. One of the biggest goals is that the children get used to a daily routine like in a real family. (school, dinner, studies, activities and games)

== Street children in St. Petersburg ==
St. Petersburg has approximately 5 million registered citizens within the municipal boundaries. There are an estimated 5,000 to 7,000 street children in St. Petersburg, with a greater number sleeping at home most of the nights but avoiding school and living on the street during the day. The general trend appears to substantiate the proposition that those sleeping at home but living on the street tend to graduate to sleeping outside the family residence within a period of 18 months. This is why it is extremely important that an organization like the GU SRZ Vera exists to improve the situation of Russian children on the margins of society.
