= Centre de la mémoire d'Oradour =

Military museum in France

Coordinates: 45°55′45″N 1°02′7″E

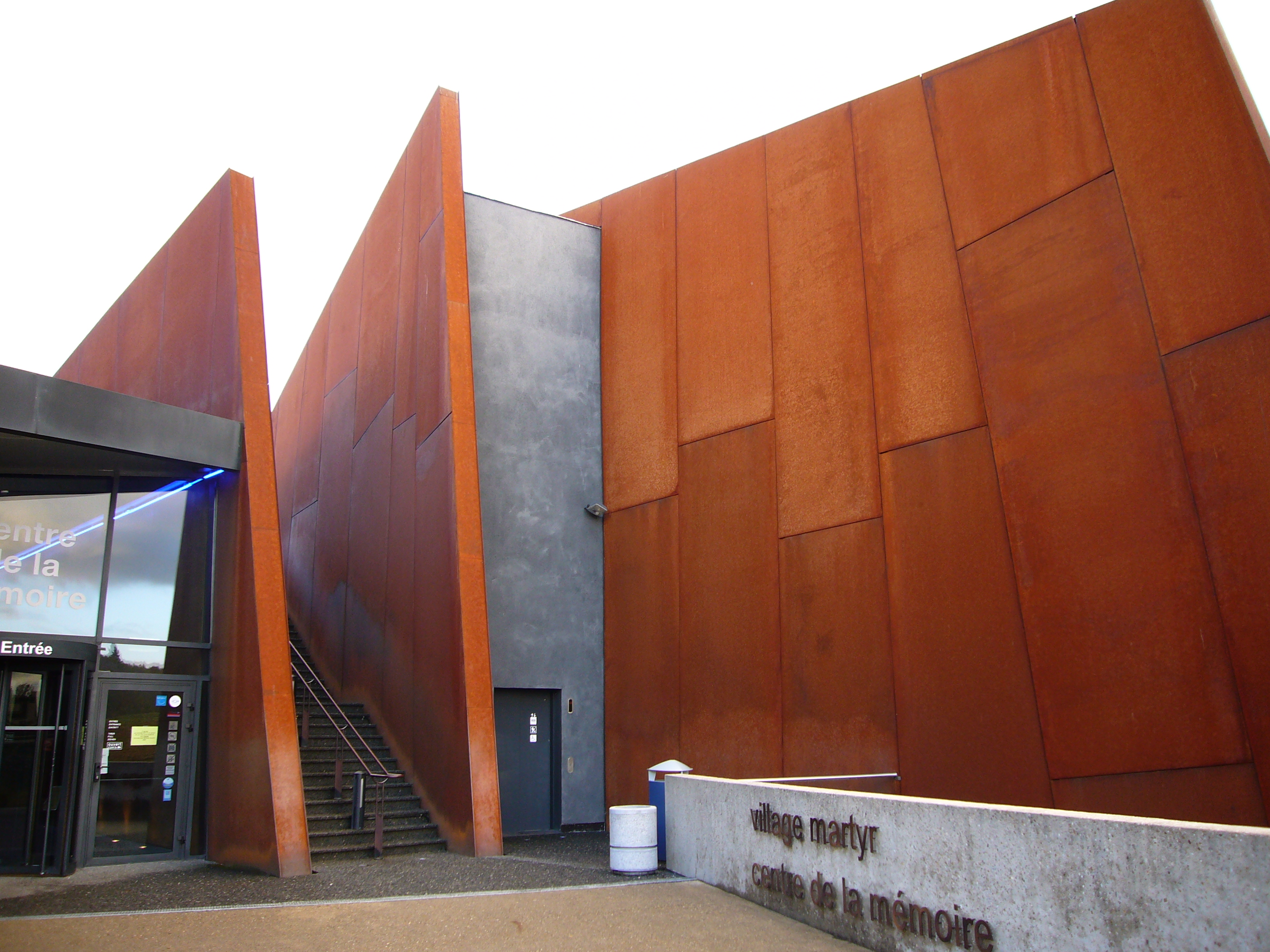
Entrance to the Centre

The Centre de la mémoire d'Oradour (the memorial center of Oradour) has made it its mission to commemorate the Oradour-sur-Glane massacre by the 2nd SS Panzer Division Das Reich of the Waffen-SS and to act as a memorial for coming generations.

== Founding ==
On initiative of Jean Claude Peyronnet, president of the Conseil Général of Haute-Vienne and with the agreement of the French association of families of the martyrs, the project was presented to the French president François Mitterrand in 1989.

In 1992 the project management was decided in an international tendering process and received the support of the ministry of culture, the ministry of war veterans and the European Community.

In 1994 a project director was engaged, to coordinate the process of historical research. At the same time, the architect Yves Devraine was assigned to design and build the Oradour memorial center.

In 1999 the Oradour memorial centre was opened by the French president Jacques Chirac and the French minister of culture Catherine Trautmann.

By 2002 the centre had had 300,000 visitors, who were able to see the permanent exhibition as well as temporary exhibits.

== Architecture ==
According to the architect's conception, the memorial centre and the landscape unite in a unique symbiosis of a so-called "non-architecture".

This "non-architecture" is realized in a roof which allows a view over the Glane valley, the ruins of the former village, and also of the new, reconstructed one. Rusty steel blades brutally separate the centre of the building symbolising destruction and remembrance as well as resistance to the elements. The materials, left in their natural state, appear aged.

In the circular entrance hall two large photographs are symbolically displayed. The one depicts Hitler haranguing the crowds at a Nuremberg rally and the other is the sign at the entrance to the ruins of Oradour-sur-Glane "Souviens-toi" (Lest you forget). The permanent exhibition is displayed through contrasting areas in black and red where picture rails hang clear of the wall and depict the Nazi movement and the advance of the division "Das Reich" towards Oradour, and light areas which depict in a much softer way the village and people of Oradour before the massacre.

On the lower level is the resource centre and rooms with temporary partitions that can accommodate school groups and teachers. Originally designed as a resource for the historical research that was undertaken in the preparation of the centre's permanent exhibition, the resource centre houses French and foreign archive material, photographs, films, publications and magazines.

The feeling of exposure that is reflected in the external appearance and the layout of the exhibition areas enable each visitor to pursue his or her own thoughts. Much importance has been placed on windows and mirrored surfaces, which encourage visitors to make the journey from the past towards the future and explore the other side of the mirror.

== Vandalism ==
In August 2020 graffiti denying the Holocaust was discovered on a wall of the Centre.

Officials placed a tarpaulin over the graffiti on the wall of the centre. The word "lie" was sprayed on the wall along with other words and the phrase "Village Martyr" was crossed over.

Gérald Darmanin, the interior minister, condemned the "abject filth" and Jean Castex, the Prime Minister, said the graffiti "dirties the memory of our martyrs". Éric Dupond-Moretti, the Minister for Justice tweeted "Shame on those who did this" and "All will be done to find and judge those who committed these sacrilegious acts."
