= Hiroshima Peace Culture Foundation =

The Hiroshima Peace Culture Foundation was established in April 1998 by the City of Hiroshima to promote peace, and to consolidate the city's activities in peace promotion, globalization, and international cooperation. It integrates with the Hiroshima International Relations Organization.
