= Wiener Library for the Study of the Nazi Era and the Holocaust =

Research library at Tel Aviv University

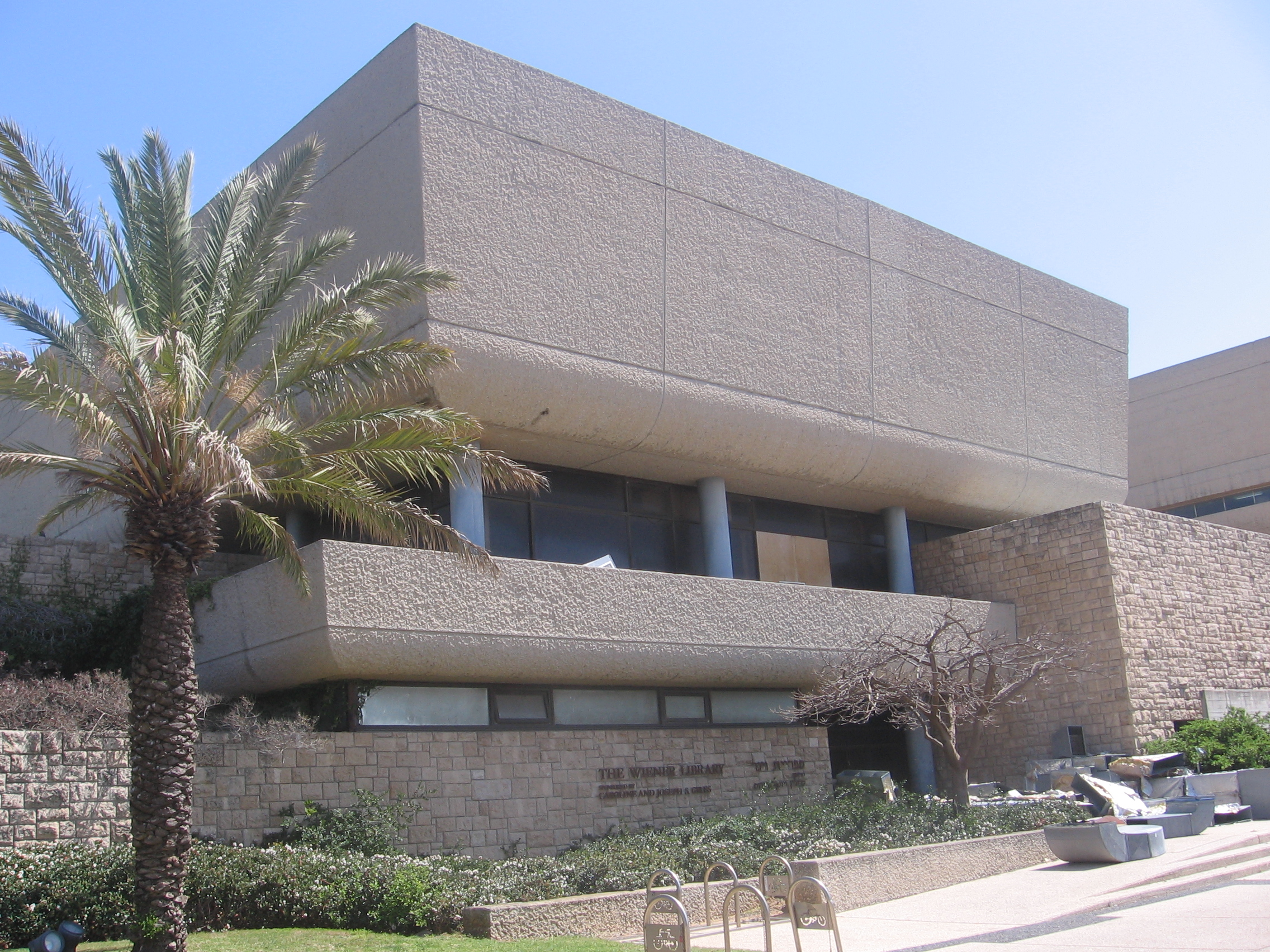
- Wiener Library in Tel Aviv University
- 32.114990511322254°N 34.8047749551364°E
- Location: Tel Aviv-Yafo, Israel
- Type: Research library

Other information
- Affiliation: Tel Aviv University
- Website: https://cenlib.tau.ac.il/wiener

The Wiener Library is a research library at Tel Aviv University which focuses on the Nazi era and the Holocaust. In addition to research books, the Library also holds the Wiener Archival Collection, consisting of thousands of documents on the Nazi era and the fate of European Jewry. The Library operates as part of the Sourasky Central Library.

== History ==
The Jewish Central Information Office (JCIO), which became known after the war as the Wiener Library, was founded in Amsterdam in 1933 by Dr. Alfred Wiener, an active member of the "Central Association of German Citizens of Jewish Faith" (Centralverein) who left Germany when the Nazis rose to power, and Prof. David Cohen, an Ancient History professor at the University of Amsterdam and a prominent member of the local Jewish community.

The establishment of the JCIO was based in an idea from the late 1920s of German Jewish activists to collect information about the Nazi party, as part of the struggle to prevent the strengthening of the party. In a similar manner, the Amsterdam center aimed to draw world attention towards the dangers of Nazi antisemitism, and the worsening of anti-Jewish policies in 1930s Europe. In 1939 Dr. Wiener transferred the collection to London. Throughout the war years he and his assistants continued to collect information and documents regarding the German occupation policy, responses to it, and particularly on the fate of European Jewry. When the war ended, Holocaust survivors' testimonies as well as information regarding the fate of Jewish refugees were collected. Up until his death in 1964, Dr. Wiener and his team continued to focus on expanding the collection.

In the late 1970s the Wiener Library in London and Tel Aviv University agreed to transfer the entire collection to the university. Following the transfer in 1980, the university's leading historians decided to establish the Wiener Library as a research library affiliated to the Sourasky Central Library. Copies of the original documents can be found on Microfilm at the Wiener Library in London.

== Today ==
The Library's collection has expanded considerably over the past three decades. It now contains: archival material and online databases of primary sources; research books; pamphlets and periodicals; as well as literature of nationalist, antisemitic and national-socialist origins. It includes such items as: various editions of The Protocols of the Elders of Zion, German and European newspapers of the Nazi period, extreme-right pamphlets, antisemitic and fascist movements and Holocaust denial literature.

The archive consists of thousands of documents from Europe in the Interwar period the Nazi era, concerning mostly the Holocaust, and the fate of Jewish communities and refugees in the post-war era. The archive includes such items as: documents from the Bern Trial, documentation of German Jewry in the 1930s, documentation of Nazi bureaucracy, survivors' and refugees' testimonies and documents from the Nuremberg trials.

The Wiener Library closely collaborates with research institutes at Tel Aviv University's Faculty of Humanities. As a research library it organizes a wide range of academic activities in order to promote interest in and research of subjects relating to the Nazi era and the Holocaust, amongst which are: lecture series, academic conferences, research workshops and exhibitions.
