= Tibetan Welfare Office =

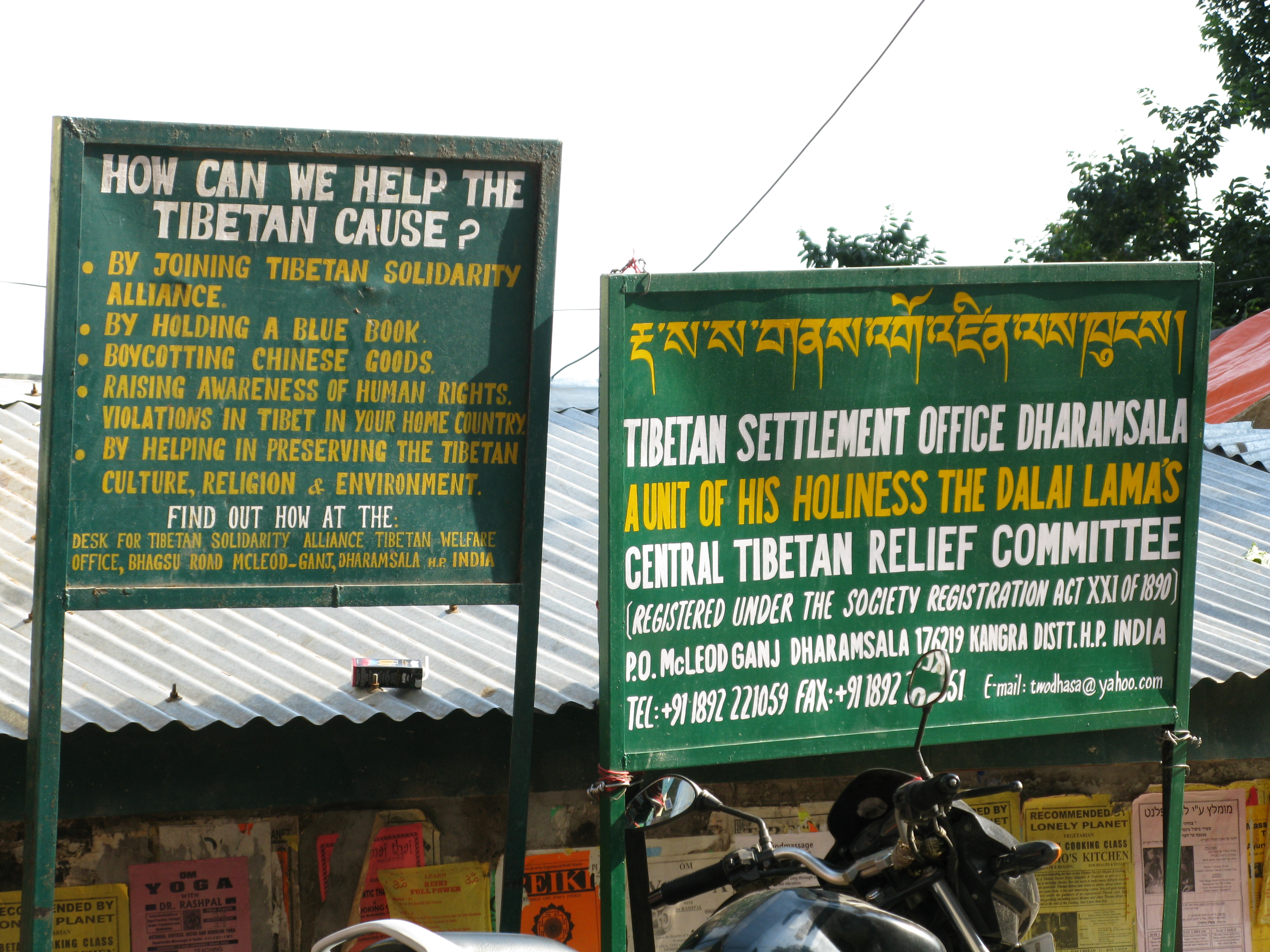
Signpost of Tibetan Settlement Office

The Tibetan Settlement Office (T.S.O.) (formerly "Tibetan Welfare Office") Tibetan: ང་ཚོའི་སྐོར།, Wylie: nga tsho'i skor is acting within the Tibetan Ministry of the Interior and is part of the central Tibetan administration in Dharmshala, India. The T.S.O. organizes projects in the social, cultural and economical sectors. Furthermore, they focus on issues of environment and enduring development.

== Waste Management ==
In 1994 the "Clean Upper Dharmshala“-project was launched by the T.S.O. The aim was to solve the waste management in Upper Dharmshala which needed strong efforts due to the increase of nonbiodegradable waste in that region.

In the beginning the project had installed three „Green Workers“, who collected recyclable material from companies and households in McLeod Ganj. A great positive impact on the environmental situation could also be achieved by installing five dustbins which were frequently emptied by a dust cart.

Furthermore, public toilets were built, which are frequently being maintained. The drainage system in the area of McLeod Ganj and the Dal Lake was displaced to prevent water pollution.

== Recycling ==
Recyclable material is being collected door by door by the "Green Workers" or emitted by the households.

The following materials are being recycled:

- soft plastics (i.e. plastic bags)
- hard plastics (cassettes, ballpoint pens, packages,...)
- glass bottles, cullet
- carton
- clothes and shoes
- tin and other metals

The collected material is either sold in Dharmshala or transported to Pathankot (distance: 80 kilometres). The transportation itself is not cost-effective.

== Paper Factory ==
The T.S.O. opened a little paper factory in Upper Dharmshala where handmade products are made by recycling paper.

== The Green Shop ==
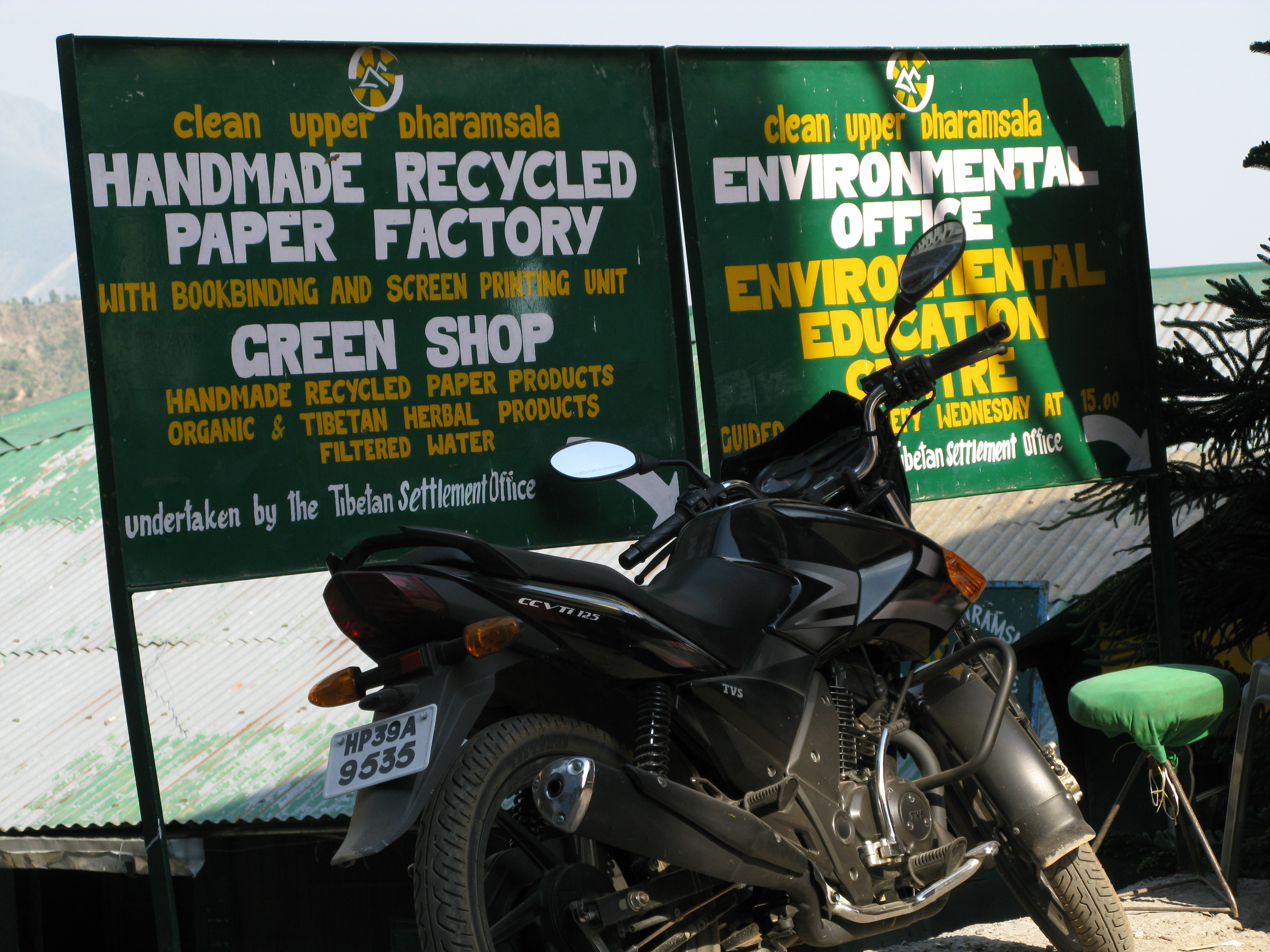
Signpost of Green Shop

In 1994 "The Green Shop“ was opened and is an environmentally oriented shop selling various products and acts as a collection point for hazardous materials, such as used batteries and expired medicines.

Furthermore, the following products are sold:

- clean water
- paper products from the paper factory
- bags
- ecological shampoos and conditioners
- soaps and crèmes
- Tibetan tea

== Social Commitment ==
The Tibetan Settlement Office is concerned about the needs of the society. It tries to find various solutions by questioning youth, education, and old-age provision. The T.S.O. is also giving legal advice in cases of conflicts in the society. One of its main goals is to obtain a social, religious and political harmony within the society.

The T.S.O. also established the „Gaddi Women's Self-Help Society“.

Since 2003, the Tibetan Settlement Office is a partner of Austrian Service Abroad, with one Austrian Social Servant (usually) per year working here for ten months.
