= Holocaust Center of Northern California =

Non-profit organization

The Holocaust Center of Northern California (HCNC) is a non-profit organization formed to ensure that the lessons of the Holocaust never be forgotten. HCNC provides services and programs to fulfill its mission of education, research and remembrance.

In 2010, the Holocaust Center of Northern California's collections and programs were relocated to Jewish Family and Children's Services of San Francisco, the Peninsula, Marin, and Sonoma Counties to form the "JFCS Holocaust Center".

== History ==
The Holocaust Center of Northern California, formerly known as The Holocaust Library and Research Center of San Francisco, was established in 1977 in reaction to the opening of a Nazi bookstore in a neighborhood in San Francisco where a large population of Holocaust survivors lived. Enraged, several Holocaust survivors broke into the bookstore and set fire to its inventory. Two individuals – Mr. Morris Weiss and his son Allan Weiss – were arrested.

The Jewish Community Relations Council intervened on behalf of the Weisses who were released. A Committee of Remembrance was formed, composed of Holocaust survivors and refugees, who decided to initiate three projects:

- An annual day of remembrance for Holocaust victims:

The first Yom HaShoah commemoration was held in April 1978

- Establishment of a research library:

The Holocaust Library and Research Center of San Francisco, opened in 1979.

- A lasting memorial in San Francisco:

"Holocaust," which was dedicated in Lincoln Park in November 1984, was created by the sculptor George Segal.

The Holocaust Center of Northern California is in collaboration with the Austrian Holocaust Memorial Service.

The Bay Area Holocaust Oral History Project merged with the HCNC.

== HCNC Programs and Services ==
=== Education ===
HCNC provides educational opportunities to students and educators through its various programs:

- Survivors Speakers Bureau
- Manovill Holocaust History Fellowship
- Day of Learning (annual day-long program of workshops on the Holocaust and genocide)
- Shalhevet (an annual trip to Poland and Israel)
- Morris Weiss scholarship
- Educator workshops
- Educator resource center

HCNC also provides adult education opportunities by sponsoring lectures and film series, and collaborating with other cultural institutions to co-sponsor community performances, exhibits, films, conferences and seminars.

HCNC is a primary sponsor of annual community Yom HaShoah commemorations throughout the Bay Area.

=== Tauber Holocaust Library ===
HCNC's Laszlo N. Tauber Library and Research includes over 12,000 volumes on the Holocaust and genocide, as well as archives which feature personal papers, government records, rare books, photographs, artifacts and special collections. Special collections include a Historical Pamphlet collection, Periodicals collection, Survivor Testimony collection, and oral history transcripts.

HCNC has one of the largest Yizkor (memorial) book collections in the world, with over 500 rare Yizkor books.

=== Oral History Project ===
HCNC's Oral History Project records interviews with Holocaust survivors, including refugees, hidden children, and children sent on the Kindertransport, as well as interviews with liberators of concentration camps and witnesses to the events of the Holocaust.

OHP has over 2000 recorded video and audio oral testimonies, which are available for research, as well as 800 transcripts.

== See also ==
- Illinois Holocaust Museum and Education Center
- Rywka Lipszyc
- Jewish Museum Milwaukee
