= Austrian Holocaust Memorial Award =

- Awarded for: Honoring "those who have shown special endeavors for the memory of the Shoah and / or made special contributions to Jewish life"
- Country: Austria
- Presented by: Austrian Service Abroad
- First award: 2006
- Website: www.auslandsdienst.at/en/ahma

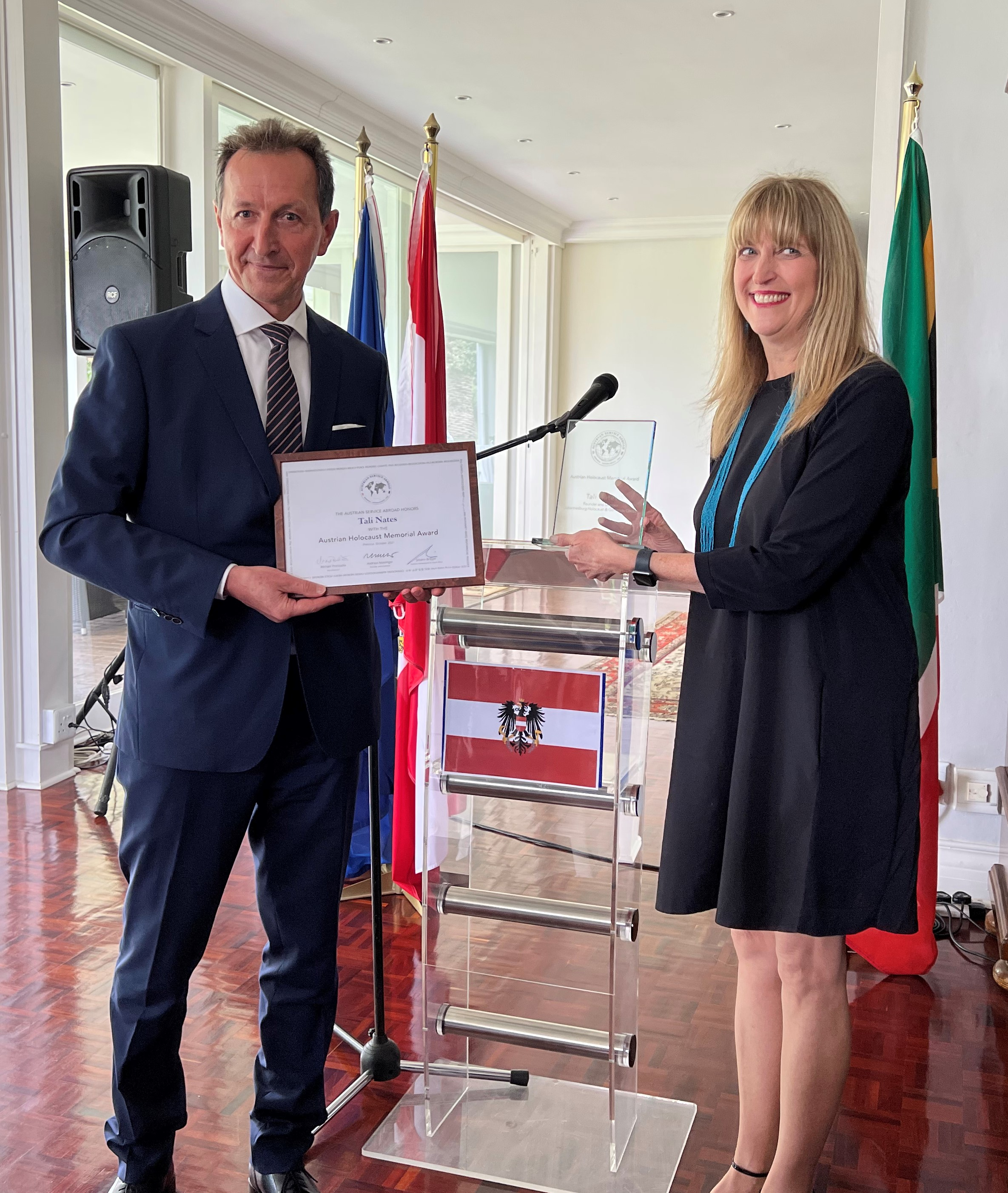
Austrian ambassador Dr Johann Brieger confers AHMA to Tali Nates in Pretoria on October 28, 2021

The Austrian Holocaust Memorial Award (AHMA) was founded by the Austrian Service Abroad in 2006.

== Meaning ==
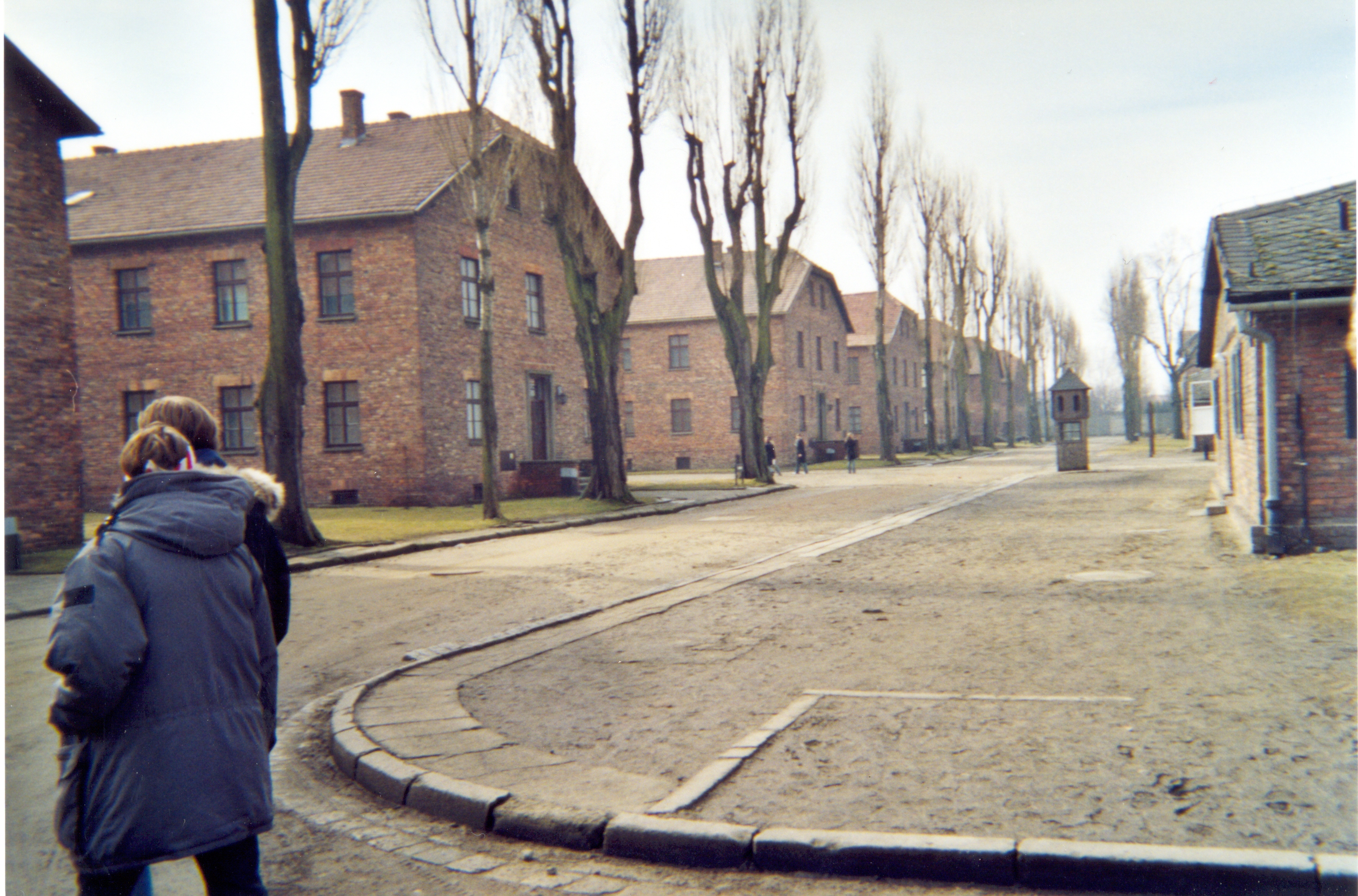
First young Austrian started in Auschwitz on September 1 1992

The prize is annually conferred to a person, a group of individuals or an institution, which has shown special endeavors for the memory of the Shoah and / or made special contributions to Jewish life.

== Background ==
Since 1992 Austria has annually sent young Austrians abroad to serve in form of Gedenkdiener in many places around the world remembering the crimes of Nazism, commemorating its victims and contributing to Jewish life. Example partner institutions are the Auschwitz Jewish Center in Poland, Yad Vashem in Israel, the Simon Wiesenthal Centre in the United States, the Jewish Museum Berlin in Germany, the Jewish Holocaust Centre in Australia, the Russian Research and Educational Holocaust Center in Russia and the Center of Jewish Studies Shanghai in China. The Gedenkdienst service is rooted in the acknowledgment of responsibility by the Republic of Austria for the crimes committed by the Austrian National Socialists.

== Presentations ==
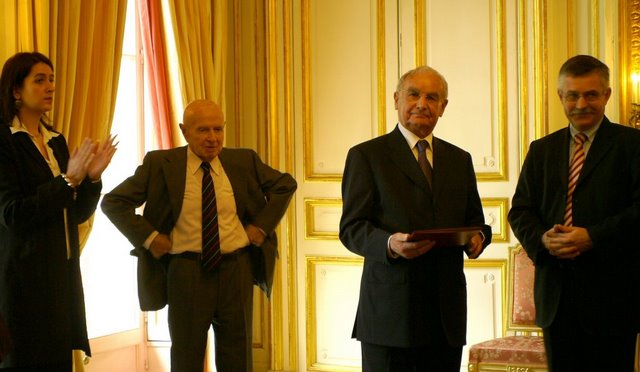
Reception at the Austrian Embassy in Paris (March 2008)

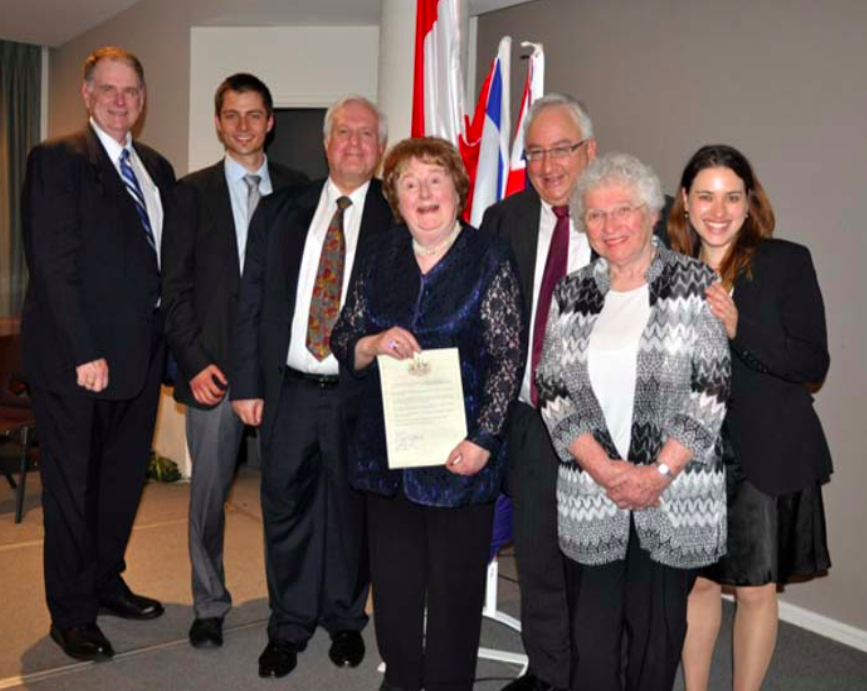
AHMA 2010 recipient Eva Marks with ceremony speakers. From left to right: Prof. Paul Bartrop, Master of Ceremony from the Austrian Service Abroad Daniel J. Schuster, Austrian ambassador to Australia Dr. Hannes Porias, Awardee Eva Marks with a Letter of Congratulations from the prime minister of Australia Julia Gillard, Australian MoP Michael Danby, Auschwitz Holocaust survivor Saba Feniger, Israeli diplomat to Australia Einat Weiss

On October 17, 2006, the Chinese historian Pan Guang was awarded the first AHMA prize. Michael Prochazka and Austrian Servand Abroad of the Year 2006 Martin Wallner attended the reception in Shanghai.

The Brazilian journalist Alberto Dines was crowned as the AHMA 2007 winner on October 24, 2007 at the Austrian consulate in Rio de Janeiro for his effort to establish Casa Stefan Zweig, a museum devoted to Stefan Zweig in Petropolis, and his book Morte no paraíso, a tragédia de Stefan Zweig.

In March 2008, Robert Hébras was assigned with the award at the Austrian embassy in Paris in presence of Beate Klarsfeld and Andreas Maislinger, founder of the Austrian Holocaust Memorial Service and initiator of the AHMA. Robert Hébras is one of only six survivors of the massacre of Oradour and is still giving tours at the age of 84. For 2009 Jay M. Ipson received the Austrian Holocaust Memorial Award. Austrian Ambassador to the United States of America Dr. Christian Prosl visited the Virginia Holocaust Museum and presented the award to the co-founder and Executive Director. Ipson is a Holocaust survivor from Lithuania, who was deported to the Kovno Ghetto at the age of six.

On October 28, 2010, the Austrian ambassador to Australia, Dr. Hannes Porias, conferred the award to the Austrian-born Holocaust survivor Eva Marks in Melbourne and read a letter of congratulations from the president of the Austrian parliament, Barbara Prammer. Also the prime minister of Australia, Julia Gillard, sent a congratulatory letter, conferred by the Australian MP Michael Danby.

== Recipients ==
- 2006 Pan Guang, Shanghai, China
- 2007 Alberto Dines, Rio de Janeiro, Brazil
- 2008 Robert Hébras, Oradour-sur-Glane, France

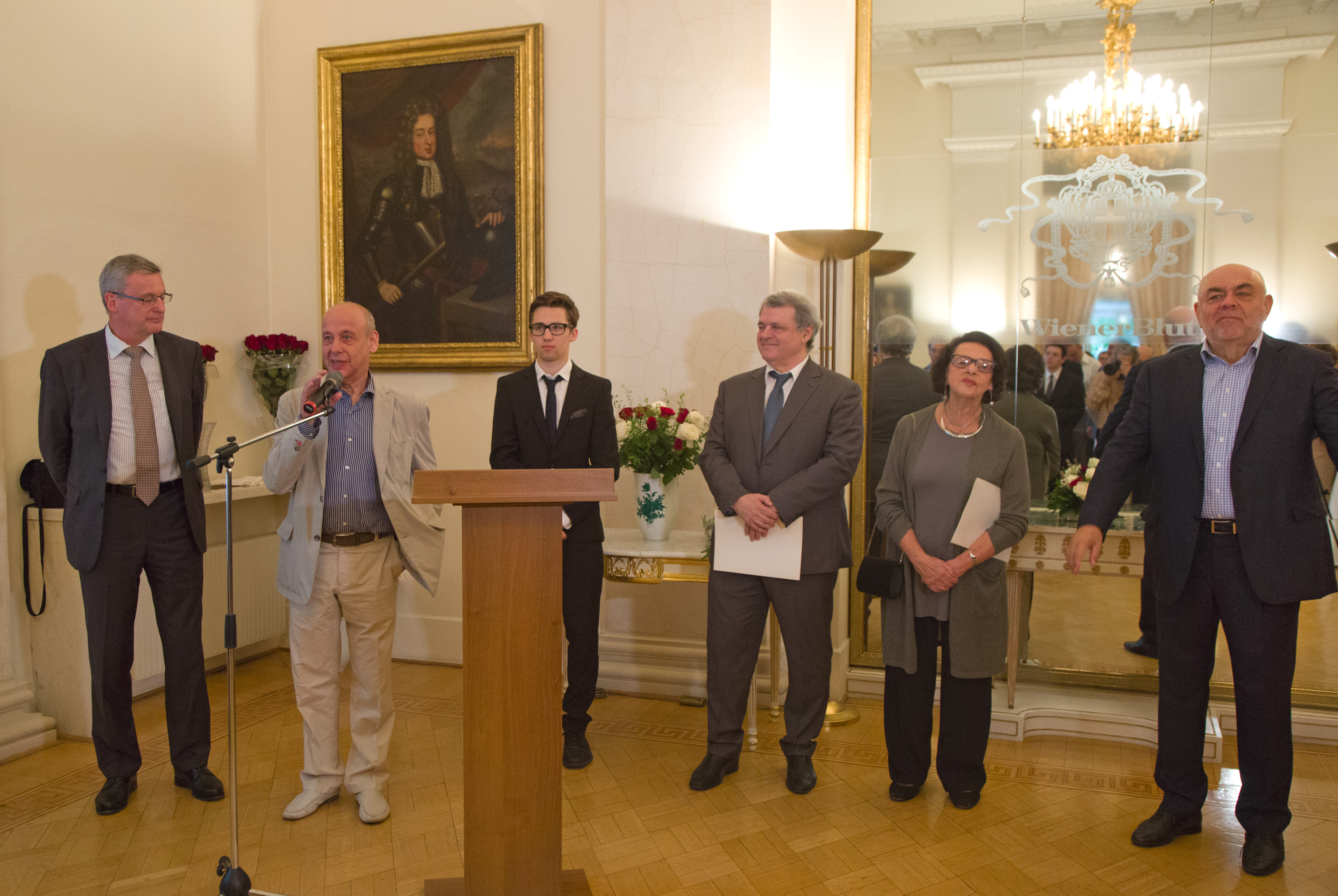
AHMA for Alla Gerber at the Austrian embassy in Moscow 2018

- 2009 Jay M. Ipson, Richmond, Virginia, United States
- 2010 Eva Marks, Melbourne, Australia
- 2011 Auschwitz Jewish Center, Oswiecim, Poland
- 2012 Ladislaus Löb, Brighton, England
- 2013 Hugo Höllenreiner, Ingolstadt, Germany
- 2014 Marģers Vestermanis, Riga, Latvia
- 2015 Erika Rosenberg, Buenos Aires, Argentina
- 2016 Giorgio Frassineti, Predappio (Forlì), Italy
- 2017 Ruben Fuks, Belgrade, Serbia
- 2018 Alla Gerber and Ilya Altman, Moscow, Russia
- 2019 Tomislav Dulic, Uppsala, Sweden
- 2020 Dusan Stefancic, Ljubljana, Slovenia
- 2021 Tali Nates, Johannesburg, South Africa
- 2022 Jeffrey D. Schwartz, NaTang, Glenn Leibowitz, Taipei, Taiwan

== See also ==
- Austrian Service Abroad
- Austrian Holocaust Memorial Service
- Andreas Maislinger
