= House of Responsibility =

Former project concept

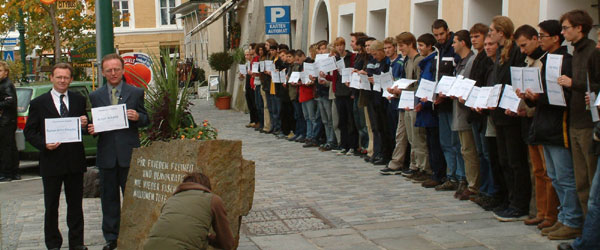
Gerhard Skiba, Andreas Maislinger and Gedenkdiener in front of Adolf Hitler's birth-house remembering Austria's Righteous Among The Nations

The House of Responsibility (abbreviated to HRB, German: Haus der Verantwortung) in Braunau am Inn was the idea of establishing an international meeting place and a place of learning in the birth-house of Adolf Hitler. People from all countries, backgrounds, religions and cultures were intended to meet in order to discuss, learn and develop projects revolving around the concept of responsibility relating to the dimensions of past, present and future. The main demographic was to be young people. The idea for the House of Responsibility originated from the founder of the Gedenkdienst and chairman of the Austrian Service Abroad, Andreas Maislinger.

== Conceptual background ==
The conceptual challenge surrounding the birth-house of Adolf Hitler roots in the fact that it is neither a perpetrator's site, such as the Obersalzberg, the Brown House or the Reichsparteitagsgelände; nor is it a victim's site, such as Auschwitz, Mauthausen or Hartheim, since Adolf Hitler was merely born in it and lived there for only two months as an infant. Nothing relating to the Holocaust was ever consciously decided or done in the house where he was born.

Nevertheless, the house is a place of symbolic meaning, a symbol of the birth of the Holocaust, for some a symbol for the birth of evil. The challenge posed was how to commemorate a place that is merely a symbol.

The House of Responsibility was about the creation of another symbol: a counter-symbol with the opposite meaning of what the birth of Adolf Hitler signifies. The House of Responsibility intended and envisioned turning the symbol of the birth of the Holocaust into a symbol of responsibility, learning, peace and creativity while concurrently turning the city of Braunau am Inn into a city representing the same values.

The House of Responsibility was to be based on the infrastructure and community of the Austrian Service Abroad and its worldwide partner organizations.

== Origins: Braunau sets a sign ==
After the FPÖ (Austrian Freedom Party) took part in the government under Jörg Haider in early 2000, the Braunauer Rundschau started to collect signatures under the slogan "Braunau setzt ein Zeichen" ('Braunau sets a sign'). Andreas Maislinger, an Austrian historian and founder of the Gedenkdienst and Braunau Contemporary History Days, reacted to the call and suggested setting up a House of Responsibility in the house where Adolf Hitler was born.

== Past – Present – Future ==
The Braunauer Rundschau presented the idea of Andreas Maislinger on 4 May 2000:

Concept HRB

transl. Volunteers from all countries, Austrian Zivildieners and former Austrian Servants Abroad should work and live together in the house. Because of this there should take place a constant exchange of ideas. The 'House of Responsibility' should be something completely new, split into three stories, where the 'unwanted inheritance' and the refurbishment of the background of the NS should take place on the first floor. The second floor will be devoted to the present, and concrete help for people will be offered for example through the Austrian Social Service and also by human rights – and third-world projects. On the third floor ideas for a more peaceful future should be worked out.

Philosophical basis for this project is the book Das Prinzip Verantwortung ('the concept responsibility') written by Hans Jonas in 1979.

== Realisation ==
The project could not be realized in the following years but the idea of taking responsibility remained. In 2005, the owner of a house close to where Hitler was born offered his house for the project. In 2002, members of the Gedenkdienst remembered the Austrian Righteous Among the Nations in front of Hitler's birth house. In October 2009, mayor Gerhard Skiba argued for the first time in support of a 'House of Peace' or 'House of Responsibility' in Hitler's birthhouse in Austria's newspaper Kurier.

In the first half of 2014, the HRB gained increasing support by the public and by acknowledged international organizations such as the Anti-Defamation League in New York, the Auschwitz Jewish Center in Oswiecim, the European Roma Rights Center and the John Rabe and International Safety Zone Memorial Hall in Nanjing.

On 2 June 2020, the Austrian Minister of Interior announced plans for the Austrian police to move into the birthplace of Adolf Hitler. The Austrian Service Abroad opposed this decision and lobbied against it.

On 22 July 2026, a police station was inaugurated in Adolf Hitler's birthplace. The website for the idea of the House of Responsibility has since been out of service.

== Supporting individuals ==
Argentina
Erika Rosenberg
Austria
Mina Ahadi, Martha Bißmann, Emil Brix, Erhard Busek, Alfred Dorfer, Klaus Eberhartinger, Valie Export, Franz Fischler, Alfred Gusenbauer, Josef Hader, André Heller, Ludwig Laher, Thomas Maurer, Cornelius Obonya, Florian Scheuba, Danielle Spera, Dirk Stermann, Ferdinand Trauttmansdorff
Brazil
Alberto Dines
China
Pan Guang
France
Michel Cullin, Beate Klarsfeld
Germany
Aleida Assmann Markus Ferber, Stefan Klein
Hungary
György Dalos, Paul Lendvai
Israel
Ben Segenreich, Moshe Zimmermann
Japan
Sven Saaler
New Zealand
Chris Harris
Poland
Wladyslaw Bartoszewski
Russia
Ilya Altman
South Africa
Tali Nates
Sweden
Gerald Nagler
Switzerland
Beat Wyss
Ukraine
Borys Sabarko
United Kingdom
Ladislaus Löb
United States
Abraham Foxman, Branko Lustig, Jack Kliger

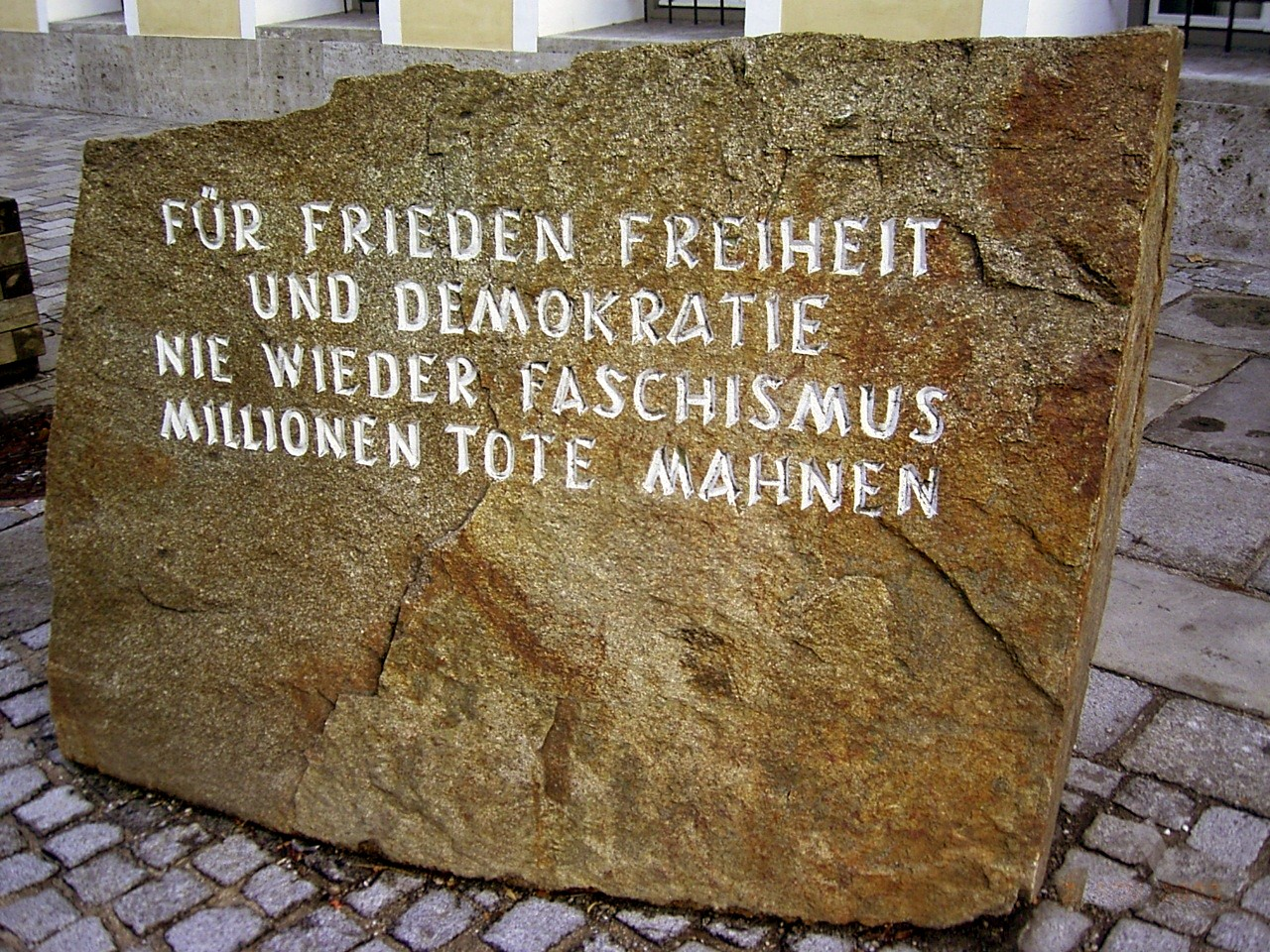
Hitler birthplace memorial stone

== Supporting organizations and institutions ==
Poland Auschwitz Jewish Center
USA
Anti-Defamation League
Ukraine
Past / Future / Art
Belgium
European Roma Rights Center

== See also ==
- Hitler birthplace memorial stone
- Braunau Contemporary History Days
- Austrian Holocaust Memorial Service
- Austrian Peace Service
- Austrian Social Service
- Andreas Maislinger
