= Giorgio Frassineti =

Italian politician (born 1964)

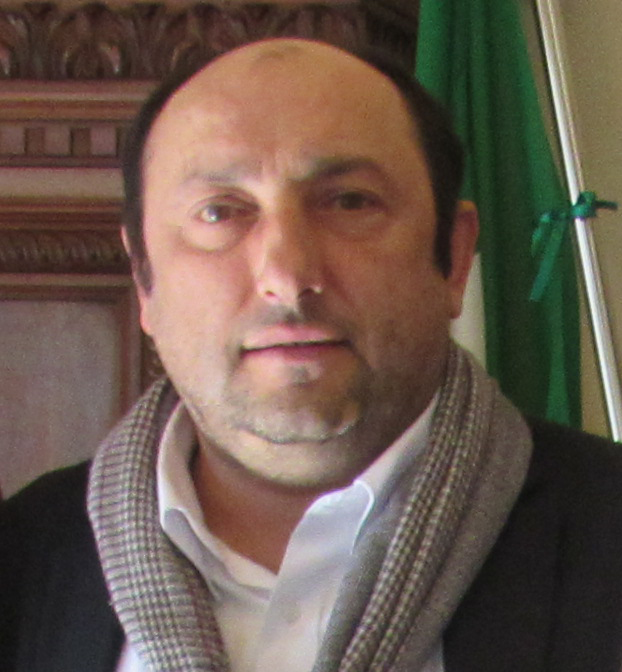
- Frassineti in August 2016

Mayor of Predappio
- In office 7 June 2009 – 26 May 2019
- Preceded by: Giuliano Brocchi
- Succeeded by: Roberto Canali

Personal details
- Born: 29 September 1964 (age 62) Forlì, Italy
- Party: Democratic Party
- Education: University of Bologna
- Profession: Geologist, politician

Giorgio Frassineti (29 September 1964) is an Italian politician who was mayor of Predappio from 2009 to 2019. Born in Forlì, he graduated in Geological Sciences at the University of Bologna and began his career in geology. During the 1990s, he also started his political career. As a member of the Democratic Party (PD), he was elected mayor of Predappio in 2009 with the centre-left coalition. He was re-elected in 2014.

An anti-fascist politician, Frassineti worked to create the Twentieth Century Documentation Centre and the Museum of Fascism. This was controversial because Predappio was the birthplace of Italian fascist dictator Benito Mussolini with significant neo-fascist pilgrims, while Frassineti hoped that the Museum of Fascim could bring new people and earned him the 2016 Austrian Holocaust Memorial Award. In 2019, no longer being mayor of Predappio, the project of the Museum of Fascism was abandoned under Predappio's right-wing administration.

== Early life and career ==
Frassineti was born in Forlì on 29 September 1964. In 1990, he graduated in Geological Sciences at the University of Bologna. After obtaining his license as a geologist on 2 May 1992, he began his professional career in the field of geology applied to engineering and geotechnics, and also operated in the issues of hydrogeology, remediation of contaminated sites, excavated soil and rocks, and environmental studies (VIA VAS and AIA). From 1995 to 1998, Frassineti was a consultant to the Geological Office of Emilia-Romagna for the creation of the Geological Map of the Plain and seismic microzonation studies.

From 1999 to 2006, Frassineti worked as an employer in the region's Water Resources Protection and Remediation Service, where he dealt with issues related to the planning of groundwater, aquifer vulnerability, and protection areas for water intended for human consumption. In 2007, he also became a teacher at the Aeronautical Technical Institute in Forlì. From 1994 to 2004, he served as a municipal councilor for Predappio. From 2004 to 2009, he served as councilor for urban planning, environment, private construction, and historical memory. During his term, he was primarily responsible for renewing urban planning tools, incorporating the requests from the vast municipal area into the regulations, and worked to revive properties. He also worked to increase cultural and economic interest in Predappio, and collaborated with the university community through several exhibitions, documentaries, conferences, and the creation of the Association of Italian Foundation Cities.

During his career, Frassineti was a councilor for the Mountain Community of the Forlì Apennines, the Romagna Land Reclamation Consortium, and the province of Forlì-Cesena with responsibility for urban planning. He was also a member of the board of directors of The Other Romagna (L'Altra Romagna) and the Association of Authentic Villages of Italy, and was a member of the Regional Committee for the Reduction of Seismic Risk of the RER. For the 2009 Italian elections, Frassineti won the January 2009 primary elections of the Democratic Party to earn the nomination for the centre-left coalition; his win was considered an upset. With 47% of the vote, he was elected mayor of Predappio in May 2009. The small town of 6,000 inhabitants in the Italian region of Emilia-Romagna, where he lives with his wife and son, is most widely known as the birthplace of Mussolini.

== Mayor of Predappio ==
Since becoming mayor, Frassineti sought to dissolve the Predappio-Mussolini Association, promoting culture and tourism based on other local resources while respecting its history. In October 2012, in response to a proposal by Unindustria director Massimo Balzani to rename Forlì Airport after Mussolini for visibility reason, with around 500 supporters of the Facebook page "Mussolini, Hands Off the Airport", Frassineti said: "I don't know why Balzani said such a thing, but, unfortunately, trivialising Mussolini for commercial gain is a mistake many people make, both on the right and the left." He added that "Mussolini's name is a hot topic, open to countless exploitations", that it was "convenient, a nice cover that boosts visibility", but that "we must be careful because we don't need to make ourselves look ridiculous. I hope Balzani will say he made a fool of himself by launching this proposal." He concluded by saying: "The wounds of fascism are still open, and Forlì Airport is precisely the site of one of those wounds. The area benefits nothing from this 'outburst'; for us, it's a step backward."

Because of Predappio's historical significance, it was of particular concern to Frassineti to preserve buildings from the 20th century. For the 2014 Italian local elections, he announced his re-election bid in March 2014 as part of the Predappio Bene Comune coalition, facing Franco D'Emilio of the centre-right coalition through the civic list For a New Predappio. After being re-elected with 45% of the vote in May 2014, Frassineti developed the idea of a historical documentation centre named the Twentieth Century Documentation Centre. In August 2016, Frassineti was given the Austrian Holocaust Memorial Award for his commitment to conducting studies on fascism through the creation of the Twentieth Century Documentation Centre. In June 2017, he announced his intention to run for the Senate of the Republic in the 2018 Italian general election if the Democratic Party supported his candidacy. He observed that as he was the mayor of a small town, he would not need to resign from the position.

From 2017 to 2019, Frassineti was president of the Union of Municipalities of Romagna Forlì. In February 2019, Frassineti expressed his satisfaction with the preliminary hearing judge Monica Galassi's decision to issue a €9,000 fine against Selene Ticchi, the suspended New Force activist who wore an "Auschwitzland" T-shirt to the anniversary celebration of the March on Rome that was organised by neo-fascists in Predappio. Interviewed by the news agency AGI, Frassineti emphasised that he was considering "the 'daspo' option for these individuals ... I think this woman should never come to Predappio again", and then called the fine issued against the defendant "very important". In the 2019 Italian local elections, Frassineti did not seek re-election and Roberto Canali, backed by Brothers of Italy (a political party heir of neo-fascism and post-fascism in Italy), and was elected as mayor of Predappio in place of Frassineti, ending the more than 70 years of left-wing rule in Predappio. Under the Canali administration, the idea of building the Museum of Fascism was abandoned by the new administration.

== Museum of Fascism ==
A documentation centre about the history of fascism was planned to house a permanent exhibition in the space of 1,000 square meters to be developed by Italian and international historians under the supervision of the Parri Institute from Bologna. In addition, space would be left for other projects that allow a critical and objective examination of the time period and at the same time cause a "learning from the past". Frassineti hoped that the museum would help attract new people rather than the neo-fascist pilgrims, and deter far-right supporters. He said that "Predappio is the right place to do this, because it's a fascist symbol ... I want to use culture as a weapon of mass destruction for ignorance."

The project planned to cooperate with the House of Responsibility for Adolf Hitler's birthplace in Braunau am Inn. Among others, the documentation centre could receive an Austrian Holocaust Memorial Servant. In September 2011, Frassineti followed an invitation from Andreas Maislinger and Oscar-winner Branko Lustig to participate at the 20th Braunauer Zeitgeschichte-Tage titled "Difficult Heritage". On 19 July 2016, the district council of Predappio officially gave the Parri Institute permission to proceed with the documentation centre. Costs were estimated to be €3 million, of which €2 million would be provided by the region of Emilia-Romagna from the European Union Structural Fund. The project attracted controversy and criticism amid concerns that it could become a place to celebrate Italian fascism and fascist leaders like Mussolini and Hitler, especially as in 2015 it marked the 70th anniversary of Mussolini's death. Frassineti insisted that the project would be a sober examination of authoritarianism. When the project was ultimately abandoned, Frassineti recalled in December 2023 that he had the support of the local Jewish community while ANPI (the Italian veterans association of anti-fascist partisans) opposed it.

== Personal life ==
Frassinati lives in Predappio alongside his wife Claudia. As of 2009, the couple had a son.

== Works ==
During his geological career, Frassineti wrote a number of publications and took part to several conferences. In 2025, he was the co-author of a book alongside two other former mayors, Ginfilippo Mignogna of Biccari and Ivan Stomeo of Melpignano. In August 2025, he and his co-authors were hosts of the fourth and final evening of Alberona's literary salon square I Libri nel Borgo to promote the book.
