= Michael Prochazka =

Michael Prochazka (born February 10, 1972, in Klagenfurt) is an Austrian social scientist and economist and vice-chairman of the Austrian Service Abroad.

== Life ==
=== Studying ===
Michael Prochazka studied economics, political science, as well as ethnology and sinology in Vienna, international relationships at the Ecole Superieure de Commerce de Paris, and graduated a studies at the Jiangxi University of Finance and Economics in Nanchang, VR China.

=== Work ===
In the years 2003-2005 he was secretary general of the international governing body of the Nature Lover and responsible for the coordination of the networking process of 50 Members and partner alliances with 500.000 members worldwide. He was also involved at the conversion of the projects Landschaft des Jahres Lebuser Land in the German-Polish border region at Frankfurt (or) and Landschaft des Jahres Jura Mountains in the French-Swiss-border region Jura.

In this capacity he was a member in the European Director-board at GREEN 9- the 9th biggest environment-movement in Europe: Greenpeace, WWF, Birdlife, Climate Action Network, Europäisches Umweltbüro, Epha Environment Network, Friends of the Earth, European Federation for Transport and Environment and Naturfreunde.

=== Engagement for Asia ===
In the year 2005 Michael Prochazka and his wife Hong Yang created the "Cheng Gong Help Scholarship Program". With this promotional program aggrieved children and juveniles from agrarian areas, whose parents are busy in the agriculture sector, are sponsored. The aim of this project is that children and juveniles who appear as engaged in a parental agriculture business, may afford attendance at school in which emerging costs get replaced by the "Cheng Gong Help Scholarship Program".

In the year 2006 he founded, together with Hong Yang, the association for the advancement of factors for success in the education field. Aim and purpose of this association is to succeed in the necessary factors for success for a deserved and sufficient education, and a basis for access to education, even in underdeveloped areas.

== Austrian Service Abroad ==
Below he was a volunteer at the Austrian Service Abroad, where he was elected in the directorate at the year 2001 and since that moment he is the locum from Andreas Maislinger and they coordinate the Austrian Holocaust Memorial Service, Austrian Social Service and Austrian Peace Service together. Michael Prochazka was in the year 2006 also applicable responsible for the amelioration of the assignments at the development cooperation. In 2003 Prochazka has conceived the mobillityprogram „experience european responsibility“ and started with the conversion. This program enables aggrieved juveniles in Europe to integrate in the job market by sponsored praxis-abidance abroad.

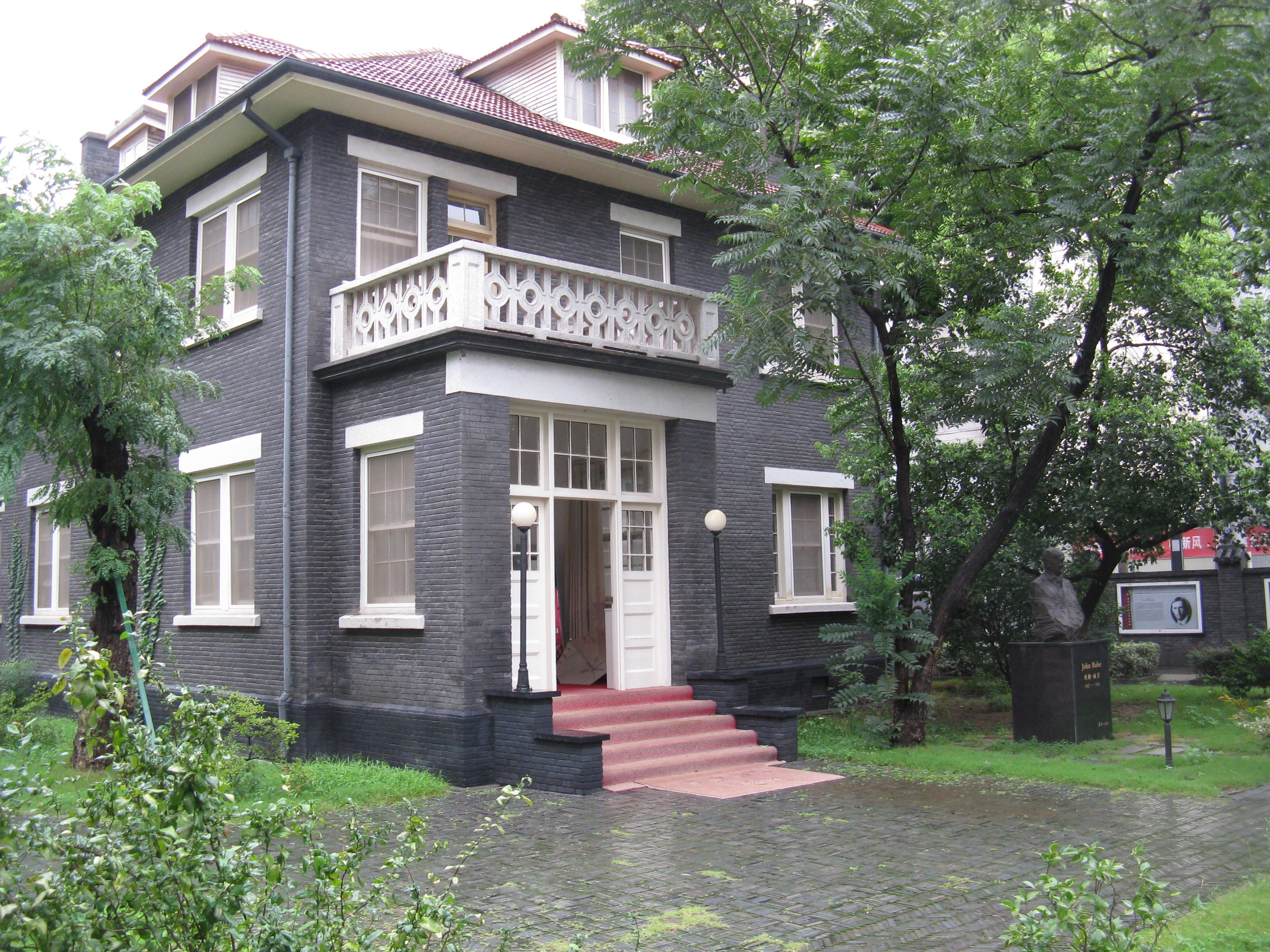
John Rabe's former residence in Nanjing (2008)

From 2001 till 2006 he prepared the Holocaust Memorial Service in China. On February 1, 2006, the first Holocaust Memorial Servant has formed up his Austrian Service Abroad in Shanghai at the centre for Jewish Studies.

On October 17, 2006, the Chinese historian Pan Guang was awarded the first Austrian Holocaust Memorial Award. Since 2008 the Austrian Service Abroad sends a peace servant to work with the John Rabe House in Nanjing every year.

== See also ==
- Austrian Service Abroad
- Austrian Holocaust Memorial Service
- Austrian Social Service
- Austrian Peace Service
- House of Responsibility
