= Franthiesco Ballerini =

Brazilian journalist (born 1981)

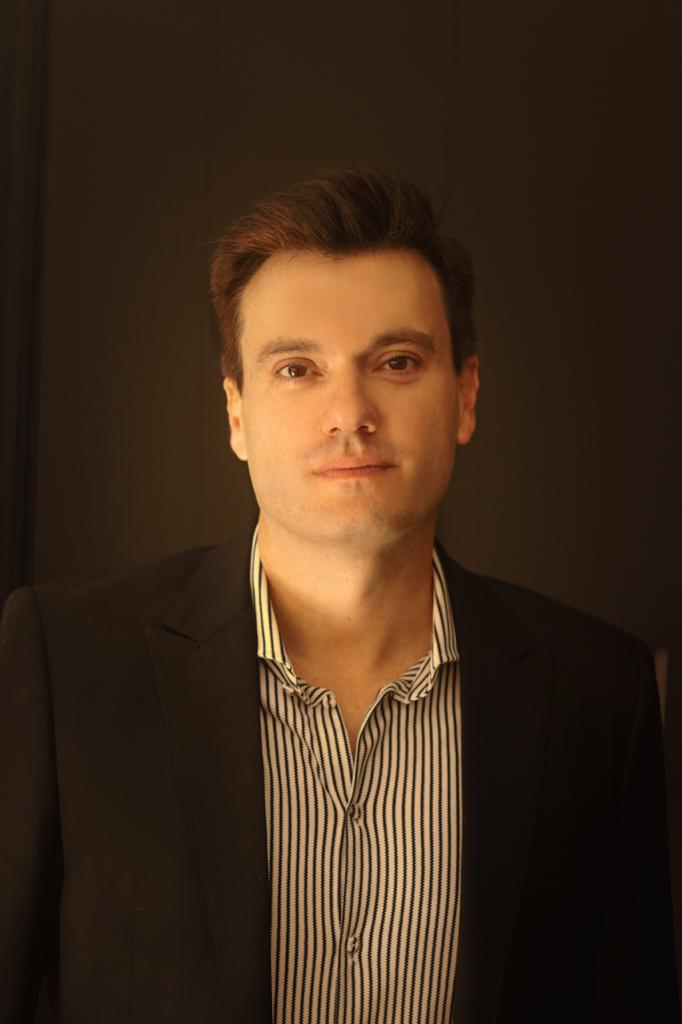
- Born: Franthiesco Anthonio Ballerini Manso; February 21, 1981 (age 45); Lorena, São Paulo, Brasil
- Education: Methodist University of São Paulo
- Occupations: journalist; writer; film critic; filmmaker; professor
- Writing career
- Genres: Soft power Movie review

Franthiesco Anthonio Ballerini Manso (born, February 21, 1981), is a Brazilian journalist, art critic who specializes in cinema, writer, professor and PhD in media communications. He was the coordinator of free courses at Academia Internacional de Cinema in São Paulo, and is a member of the Associação Brasileira de Críticos de Arte. In 2015 he started researching about the power of culture in the world, with an emphasis on artistic productions and audiovisual entertainment in the 21st century.

== Career ==
For eight years he was a journalist at Estadão, where he worked as a critic and international correspondent. From 2016 to 2019 he was a columnist at the Observatório da Imprensa, where he wrote regularly about themes related to the coverage of the arts. Since 2020, he has been writing about cultural soft power for the American independent media group, Fair Observer. In 2022, he was invited by the Segerstrom Center for the Arts in Costa Mesa, California, to cover the event Reunited in Dance, a spectacle with Russian and Ukrainian ballet dancers.

In Brazil, as a writer, he was a pioneer in dedicating exclusive publications about Indian cinema and soft power as a persuasive tool in arts and entertainment. He published 6 books since 2009, all about arts, cinema and arts journalism. His fourth book, Poder Suave – Soft Power was a finalist for the 60th Prêmio Jabuti in the creative economy category. In 2016, his article ‘Is Cinema a cultural bridge between Brazil and India?’ was published in the foreign language book Sur South – Poetics and Politics of Thinking Latin America / India, which is part of the Iberoamerican Library in Berlin, considered the greatest European library of Latin-American publications.

In cinema, he has worked as a producer, director and screenwriter, in fiction and documentaries, short and medium length films. He produced Legacy, part of the 2nd edition of ‘Films of City Frames’, invited by the Italian company Armani, exhibited during London Film Festival in 2015. In that same year, he wrote and directed the short Name, about journalistic vanity. The short was part of the official selection of Brazilian and international film festivals.

As film critic, he has contributed to the most important Brazilian media groups, and today he covers movie and tv shows releases for Metrópolis, a Brazilian cultural program shown by TV Cultura. He was also jury in competitive film festivals around Brazil.

== Bibliography ==
Year	Portuguese title	ISBN
2009	Diário de Bollywood	978-85-323-0537-4
2012	Cinema brasileiro no Século 21	978-85-323-0706-4
2015	Jornalismo cultural no Século 21	978-85-323-0960-0
2017	Poder Suave (Soft Power)	978-85-323-1064-4
2020	História do Cinema Mundial	978-85-323-1148-1
2023	Poder Cultural	978-65-554-9130-2

== Filmography ==
Year	Title	Acting
2009	Bollyworld	co-production and script
2015	Legado (Legacy)	production
2015	Nome (Name)	direction and script

== See also ==
- Joseph Nye
