= Centre for Jewish Studies =

Centre for Jewish Studies or Center for Jewish Studies may refer to one of the following:

Commonwealth spelling

- Oxford Centre for Hebrew and Jewish Studies
- Centre for Jewish Studies at York University

US spelling

- Center of Jewish Studies Shanghai
- Center for Jewish Studies Heidelberg
- Center for Jewish Studies at Duke University
- Center for Jewish Studies at Graduate Theological Union
- Center for Jewish Studies at University of California, Berkeley
- Center for Jewish Studies at University of Florida
- Center for Jewish Studies at University of Minnesota
