= Social Austria of the Future =

Social Austria of the Future Soziales Österreich der Zukunft
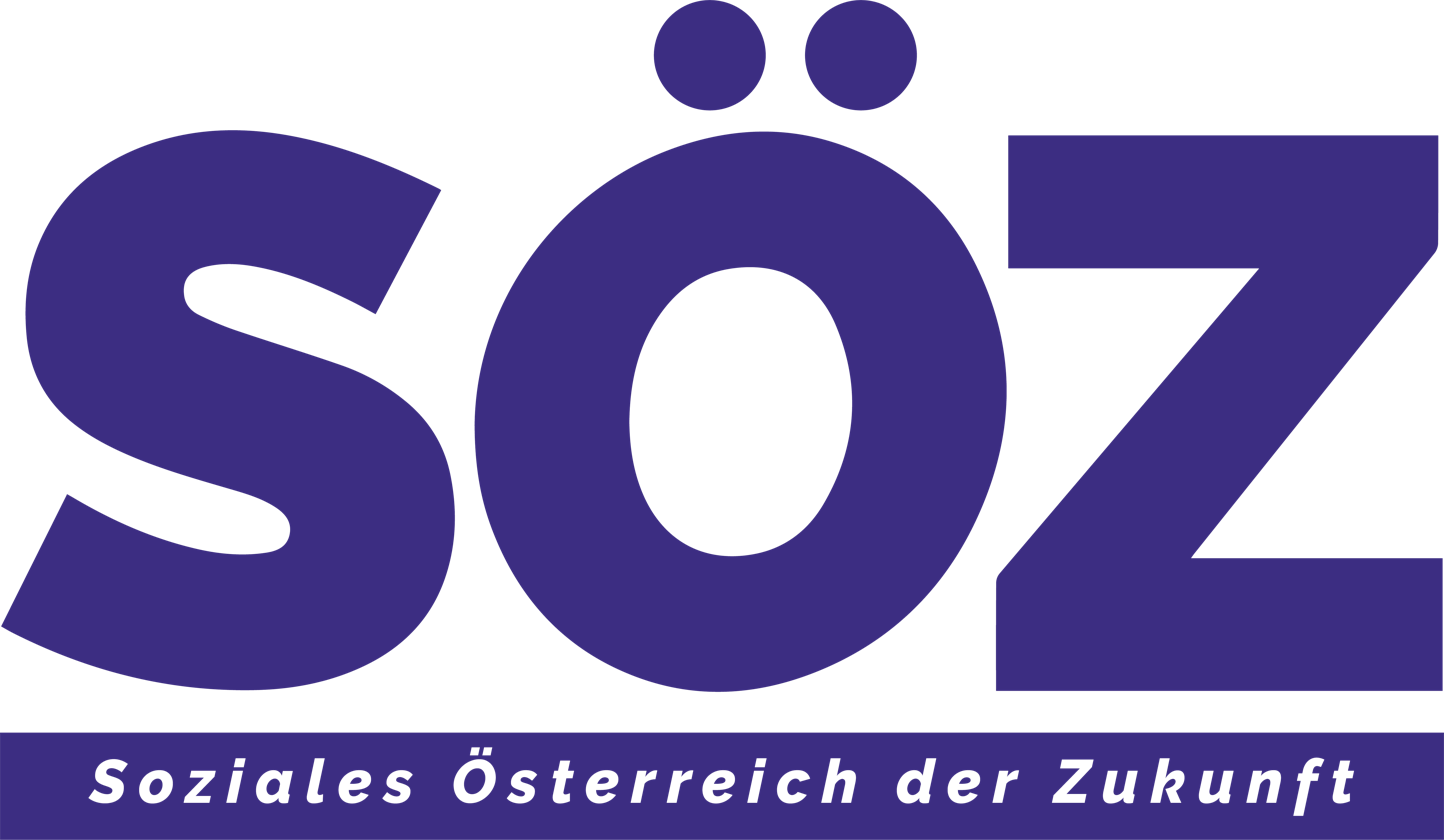
- Abbreviation: SÖZ
- Leader: Hakan Gördü
- Founded: 10 May 2019
- Merger of: Together for Vienna; New Movement for the Future
- Headquarters: Gudrunstraße 167 1100 Wien
- Ideology: Minority rights Multiculturalism; Identity politics Social ecology
- Political position: Left-wing
- Colours: Purple
- National Council: 0 / 183
- Federal Council: 0 / 61
- State diets: 0 / 440
- Viennese District councils: 2 / 1,144

Website
- soez.at

The Social Austria of the Future (German: Soziales Österreich der Zukunft; SÖZ, Turkish for "promise") is a small Austrian party that ran for the first time in the 2020 Viennese state and municipal elections.

== History and positions ==
SÖZ (Turkish: söz = the promise) was founded in 2019 by Hakan Gördü. It emerged from a renaming of the List Together for Vienna (GfW), which stood in the state and municipal council elections in Vienna in 2015, and its merger with the list New Movement for the Future. Party chairman Gördü ran for GfW at district level in 2015, but did not win a mandate. Until 2016 he was deputy chairman of the Union of Euro-Turkish Democrats (today: Union of International Democrats), but resigned after controversial statements in connection with the attempted coup in Turkey in 2016 when he attacked critics of the ruling party Justice and Development Party (AKP). The central themes of the party are the "fight against Islamophobia", the promotion of more multiculturalism and the protection of minorities.

Contrary to the term "migrants party" often used in the media, Hakan Gördü emphasized that SÖZ is not solely dedicated to "migrant" issues. On the other hand, he promised "progress for society as a whole. And that minorities can participate in political processes and actively shape the future." According to its own statements, the SÖZ positions itself "left of the center." He ruled out that the party could be influenced from abroad and that Turkish domestic politics should not separate people in Austria. The party describes itself as "socially ecological". In addition to its commitment to minorities, environmental protection and social justice are important issues.

== 2020 Viennese elections ==
In the run-up to the state and municipal council elections, SÖZ was able to collect enough signatures to be allowed to run for candidates in all 18 constituencies. In the district council election, which took place at the same time, the party ran in 19 of 23 districts (not in the 1st, 4th, 6th and 8th district). Contrary to the original plan to set up Hakan Gördü as the sole top candidate for the state elections, the former member of the National Council Martha Bissmann (non-party, previously Liste Pilz) could be won for a dual leadership. She announced that she wanted to get involved with the SÖZ against racism and everyday discrimination. Bissmann did not join the SÖZ for this. A curiosity among the candidates for the district councils was Alfred "Ali" Wondratsch, a former FPÖ district councilor who converted to Islam in 2012 and since then had been the only Muslim functionary of the Vienna FPÖ.

The party won 1.20% of the vote and thus did not enter the state parliament, but with a total of seven mandataries it was able to enter six district councils. SÖZ won two district representatives (including party chairman Gördü) in the Favoriten district, Top candidate Bissmann moved into the district council of Ottakring. The party promised to stand in the municipal council election in Bissmann's hometown of Graz, which was originally planned to be held in 2022.

In the end, SÖZ did not stand in the 2021 Graz local election. For the 2022 Austrian presidential election, SÖZ supported the incumbent president Alexander van der Bellen. SÖZ endorsed Gaza List in the 2024 Austrian legislative election.

According to analysis published by the OGM Institute, 20% of voters of Turkish immigrant background voted for SÖZ, making it the second-most popular party among this demographic.

== 2025 Viennese elections ==
SÖZ ran again in the 2025 Viennese state election, The party won 0.86% of the vote and thus did not enter the state parliament.
