= Six Point Films =

Six Point Films is a film production company based in Los Angeles, California. The company was established by Academy Award-winning producer Branko Lustig and entrepreneur Phil Blazer to produce "meaningful, thought-provoking films". The company was launched in 2008 with a limited slate of projects, based on historical true stories.

The company was initially started as a film development branch of Blazer Media Group (a publishing, radio and television production company) but has grown to its own separate entity to facilitate the production and financing of these theatrical projects.

The company holds the rights to the life story of Anne Frank.
