= Eva Marks =

Holocaust survivor (1932–2020)

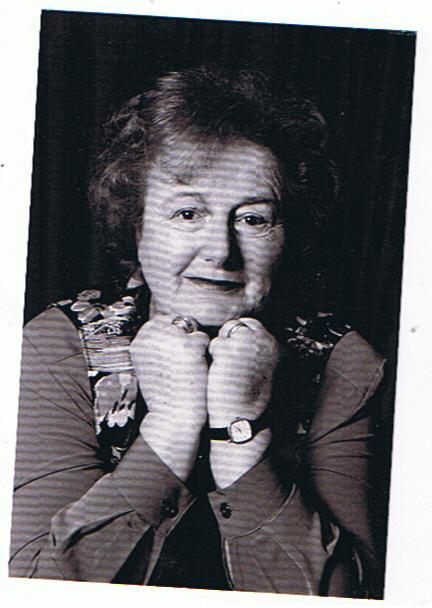
Eva Marks

Eva Marks (born July 1, 1932, in Vienna – January 27, 2020) was a survivor of the Holocaust and the wife of Stan Marks.

== Life ==
Born in Vienna to Austrian-Jewish parents, shortly after her birth her family fled to Latvia after the Kristallnacht. Her family subsequently left due to the Anschluss of Austria and risk of Nazi Germany. Her family meanwhile waited to get a US visa. After the German invasion of Russia in 1941, she and her family were transported by the Soviets to a Gulag located in deep Siberia, followed by another one to Kazakhstan in 1943. She built up a new existence in Melbourne following her liberation in 1947. Eva describes the story of her life in her book A Patchwork Life.

For decades she talked and lectured about her own and Jewish people's experiences during the Second World War in Europe and the Soviet Union, e.g. by speaking on Radio National in Australia's public broadcaster ABC or by contributing to the interactive video installation system Evolution of Fearlessness that was shown at the Melbourne International Arts Festival in 2009. She first went on record to speak publicly about her war experiences as early as 1952 on a Canadian radio channel. She worked as a volunteer for the Jewish Holocaust Museum and Research Centre in Melbourne for 17 years, for the Jewish Museum of Australia for 18 months, and was treasurer for three years of the Friends of the Holocaust Centre. Furthermore, she was a founding member of the Melbourne branch of the World Federation of the Child Survivors of the Holocaust.

On October 28, 2010, Eva Marks was awarded the Austrian Holocaust Memorial Award.

On January 27, 2020, Eva Marks died in Melbourne, Australia, survived by her family.

== Merits ==
- Child Survivors Certificate of Merit by the Jewish Holocaust Museum and Research Centre in recognition of the outstanding contributions made by Eva Marks
- Certificate of Recognition from Steve Bracks in recognition of her voluntary service for the Jewish Holocaust Museum and Research Centre
- Certificate of Recognition from the Glen Eira city in recognition of her many hours of voluntary service to the community
- Austrian Holocaust Memorial Award, October 28, 2010

== Works ==
- A Patchwork Life (2002)
