= Marģers Vestermanis =

Latvian Holocaust survivor and historian (1925–2026)

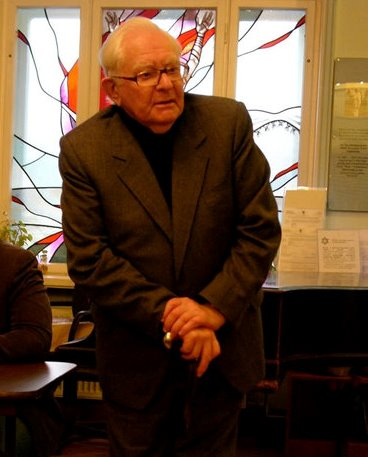
- Born: 18 September 1925; Riga, Latvia
- Died: 30 July 2026 (aged 100)
- Citizenship: Latvian
- Education: University of Latvia
- Known for: Founder of the museum Jews in Latvia
- Spouse: Hava Vestermane (1949–2022)
- Father: Ābrams Vestermanis
- Awards: Order of the Three Stars (2006); Austrian Holocaust Memorial Award (2015)
- Scientific career
- Fields: History of the Jews in Latvia

Marģers (Meirs) Vestermanis (18 September 1925 – 30 July 2026) was a Latvian Holocaust survivor, historian, and the founder and first director of the museum Jews in Latvia.

== Biography ==
=== Youth and World War II ===
Marģers Vestermanis was born in Riga into a Latvian Jewish, German-speaking family as the youngest of three sons of a merchant and manufacturer. He attended the Riga German Primary School No. 10 until 1933, and was later a student of the private, German (until 1934) and Latvian-language Jewish private gymnasium Ezra. In addition to that, Vestermanis received religious education from a rabbi at the age of 6 until he turned 15.

His father had most of his possessions confiscated by the Soviet authorities after Latvia's occupation in 1940. Upon the arrival of the Wehrmacht after the Nazi occupation of Latvia in 1941, the family was taken to the Riga Ghetto, where Marģers had to work as a homemaker, assisting the underground resistance movement of the ghetto at the same time. All members of the family and relatives, except Marģers, were killed in the Rumbula massacre in late 1941. After the ghetto was closed in 1943, he was interned in the Kaiserwald concentration camp. He was subjected to forced labor at the SS-Truppenübungsplatz Seelager and the neighboring camps Poperwahlen (Popervāle) and Dondangen (in Dundaga). Sent on a death march towards Liepāja in late 1944, he was able to escape into the woods nearby Ugāle, where he later joined a group of Soviet partisans, with whom he spent the rest of the war.

=== After World War II ===
After the war, Vestermanis returned to Riga and married a school acquaintance, medical student Hava Šneura, in 1949. He studied history at the Latvian State University and later worked in the Latvian State Historical Archive. He began researching the history of Latvian Jews, and was able to conduct full-time research after the start of the restoration of the independence of Latvia in the late 1980s. He organized the first gathering of Holocaust survivors of Riga in November 1988, and a year later in 1989 he founded the museum "Jews in Latvia", the first institution dedicated to Jewish history in Latvia since WWII, serving as its first director. Until 1996, when the first permanent exhibition was unveiled, the museum worked only as a research center.

In 1998 Vestermanis was appointed to the Commission of Historians at the Chancellery of the President of Latvia, which researched topics connected to the politics of the Nazi and Soviet occupation regimes on Latvia. He published a number of books and research papers about the history of the Jews and Holocaust in Latvia, as well as worked as a consultant on Latvian documentaries and films dedicated to these topics (e.g. The Mover by Dāvis Sīmanis Jr. in 2018). He was appointed doctor honoris causa of the Latvian Academy of Sciences.

Vestermanis died on 30 July 2026, at the age of 100.

== Awards ==
- In 2006 Marģers Vestermanis received the Herbert-Samuel-Award for tolerance and indulgence in Riga. The same year, he received the highest award of Latvia - the Order of the Three Stars.
- In 2007 he was awarded an honorary doctorate by the Latvian Academy of Sciences.
- In 2015 he was awarded the Austrian Holocaust Memorial Award by ambassador to Latvia Arad Benkö.
