= Emilie Schindler =

Wife of Oskar Schindler (1907–2001)

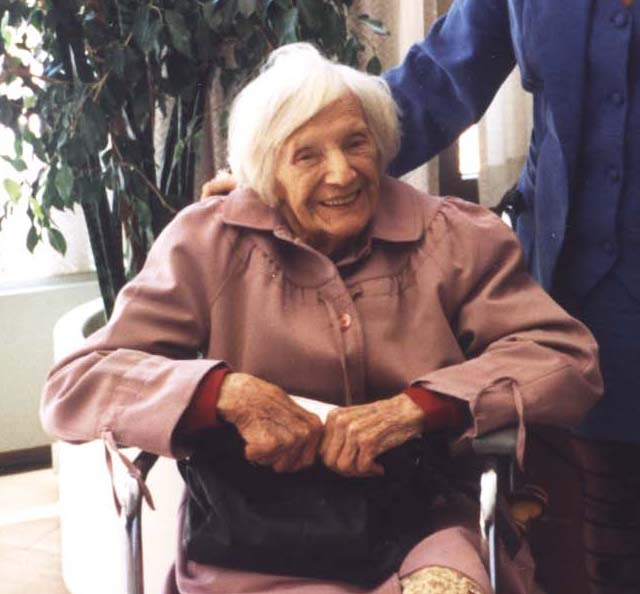
- Schindler in 2000
- Born: Emilie Pelzl; 22 October 1907; Maletín, Moravia, Austria-Hungary
- Died: 5 October 2001 (aged 93); Strausberg, Germany
- Known for: Humanitarian work
- Spouse: Oskar Schindler (m. 1928; died 1974)

Emilie Schindler (German: [eˈmiːli̯ə ˈʃɪndlɐ]; née Pelzl [ˈpɛltsl̩]; 22 October 1907 – 5 October 2001) was a Sudeten German-born woman who, with her husband Oskar Schindler, helped to save the lives of 1,200 Jews during World War II by employing them in his enamelware and munitions factories, providing them immunity from the Nazis. She was recognized as Righteous Among the Nations by Israel's Yad Vashem in 1994.

== Early life ==
She was born in the village of Alt Moletein (today Maletín in the Czech Republic), to Sudeten German farmers Josef and Marie Pelzl. She had an older brother, Franz, with whom she was very close.

Schindler's early life in Alt Moletein was idyllic, and she was quite fond of nature and animals. She was also interested in the Romani who would camp near the village for a few days at a time; their nomadic lifestyle, their music, and their stories fascinated her.

== Marriage ==
Emilie Pelzl first met Oskar Schindler in 1928, when he came to Alt Moletein to sell electric motors to her father. After dating for six weeks, the couple married on 6 March 1928 in an inn on the outskirts of Svitavy, Schindler's hometown.

In spite of his flaws, Oskar had a big heart and was always ready to help whoever was in need. He was affable, kind, extremely generous and charitable, but at the same time, not mature at all. He constantly lied and deceived me, and later returned feeling sorry, like a boy caught in mischief, asking to be forgiven one more time—and then we would start all over again ...

== World War II ==
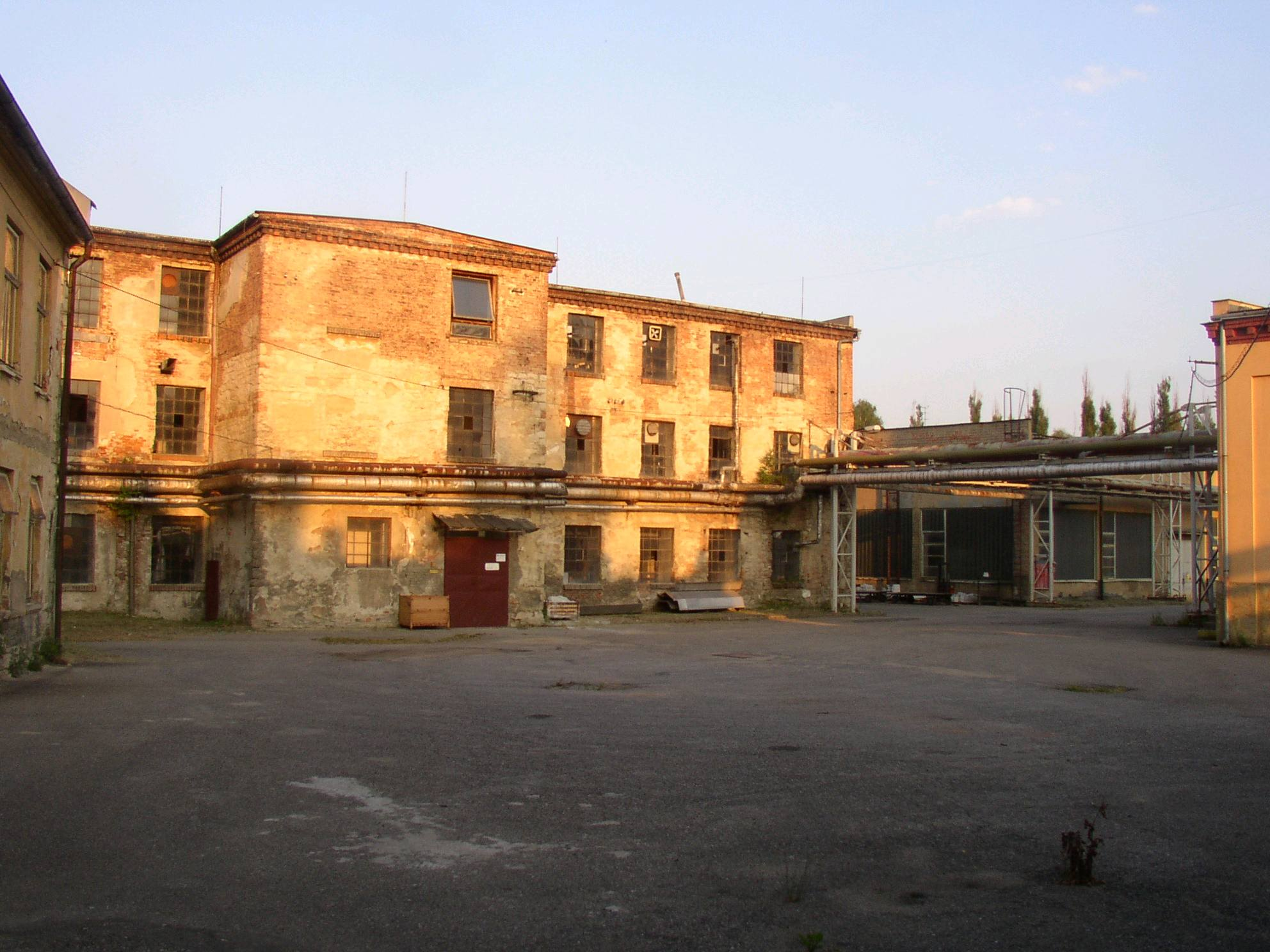
Schindler's factory at Brněnec in 2004

In 1938, the unemployed Oskar Schindler joined the Nazi Party and moved to Kraków, leaving his wife in Svitavy. There he gained ownership of an enamelware factory that had lain idle and in bankruptcy for many years and that he renamed Deutsche Emaillewaren-Fabrik, where he principally employed Jewish workers because they were the cheapest. However, he soon realized the true brutalities of the Nazis, and the Schindlers started protecting his Jewish laborers. Initially, they saved the workers by bribing the SS guards; later, they listed their employees as essential factory workers, manufacturing munitions for the Reich. When conditions worsened and they started running out of money, she sold her jewels to buy food, clothes, and medicine. She looked after sick workers in a secret sanatorium in the camp in Brněnec, Czech Protectorate, with medical equipment purchased on the black market.

One of the survivors, Maurice Markheim, later recalled:

She got a whole truck of bread from somewhere on the black market. They called me to unload it. She was talking to the SS and because of the way she turned around and talked, I could slip a loaf under my shirt. I saw she did this on purpose. A loaf of bread at that point was gold ... There is an old expression: Behind the man, there is the woman, and I believe she was the great human being.

The Schindlers saved more than 1,200 Jews from extermination camps. In May 1945, when the Soviets moved into Brünnlitz, the Schindlers left the Jews in the factory and went into hiding, in fear of being prosecuted because of Oskar's ties with the Nazi party.

== Life after the war ==
The Schindlers fled to Buenos Aires, Argentina, with a dozen of the Schindler Jews. In 1949, they settled there as farmers and were supported financially by a Jewish organization.

In 1957, a bankrupt Oskar Schindler abandoned his wife and returned to Germany, where he died in 1974. Although they never divorced, they also never saw each other again. In 1993, during the production of the film Schindler's List, Emilie Schindler and a number of surviving Schindler Jews visited her husband's grave in Jerusalem; she was accompanied by Caroline Goodall, the actress who portrayed her in the film.

At last we meet again ... I have received no answer, my dear, I do not know why you abandoned me ... But what not even your death or my old age can change is that we are still married, this is how we are before God. I have forgiven you everything, everything ...

After the film's release, Emilie's close friend and biographer, Erika Rosenberg, quoted Emilie in her book as saying that the filmmakers had paid "not a penny" to Emilie for her contributions to the film. These claims were disputed by Thomas Keneally, author of Schindler's Ark, who claimed he had recently sent Emilie a cheque of his own, and that he had gotten into an argument with Rosenberg over this issue before Emilie angrily told Rosenberg to drop the subject. In his 2001 film In Praise of Love, filmmaker Jean-Luc Godard accuses Steven Spielberg of neglecting Emilie while she was supposedly dying, impoverished, in Argentina. In response to Godard, film critic Roger Ebert mused, "Has Godard, having also used her, sent her any money?" and "Has Godard or any other director living or dead done more than Spielberg, with his Holocaust Project, to honor and preserve the memories of the survivors?"

Schindler lived with her pets for many years in her small house in San Vicente, 40 kilometres south-west of Buenos Aires. She received a small pension from Israel and Germany. Uniformed Argentinian police were posted 24 hours a day to protect her from anti-Semitic extremist groups. She formed friendships with many of the soldiers.

== Death ==
In July 2001, during a visit to Berlin, Schindler told reporters that it was her "greatest and last wish" to spend her final years in Germany, adding that she had become increasingly homesick. She died at the age of 93 from the effects of a stroke in Märkisch-Oderland Hospital, Strausberg, on the night of 5 October 2001, 2½ weeks before her 94th birthday. Her only relative was a niece in Bavaria. She is buried at the cemetery in Waldkraiburg, Germany, about an hour away from Munich. Her tombstone includes the words from the Mishnah, Sanhedrin 4:5, Wer einen Menschen rettet, rettet die Ganze Welt ("Whoever saves one life, saves the entire world.").

== Legacy ==
Schindler was honored by several Jewish organizations for her efforts during World War II. In May 1994, she and her husband received the title Righteous Among the Nations from Yad Vashem, along with Miep Gies, the woman who hid Anne Frank and her family in the Netherlands during the war. In 1995, she was decorated with the Order of May, the highest honor given to foreigners who are not heads of state in Argentina. Her life inspired Erika Rosenberg's book Where Light and Shadow Meet, first published in Spanish in 1992 and later made available in English and German translations.

She appears in the Thomas Keneally novel Schindler's Ark.

She is the subject of the opera Frau Schindler by composer Thomas Morse, which premiered in 2017 at the Gärtnerplatz Theater in Munich. The following year a new production of the opera, directed by Vladimir Alenikov, was produced at the Stanislavsky Nemirovich-Danchenko Theatre for their hundredth anniversary season.

== See also ==
- Individuals and groups assisting Jews during the Holocaust
- List of Righteous among the Nations by country

== Sources ==
- Bülow, Louis (2005). "Emilie Schindler: An Unsung Heroine". auschwitz.dk.
- Crowe, David M. (2004). Oskar Schindler: The Untold Account of His Life, Wartime Activities, and the True Story Behind the List. Cambridge, MA: Westview Press. ISBN 0-8133-3375-X.
- Ebert, Roger (18 October 2002). "In Praise of Love". Chicago Sun-Times.
- "Emilie Schindler". The Independent. London. 7 October 2001. Archived from the original on 21 October 2010.
- "Emilie Schindler, 93, Dies; Saved Jews in War". The New York Times. 8 October 2001.
- Keneally, Thomas (2008). Searching for Schindler: A Memoir. New York: Nan A. Talese.
- "Schindler list survivor recalls saviour". BBC News. 1 May 2008.
- Steinhouse, Herbert (April 1994). "The Real Oskar Schindler". Saturday Night.
- Thompson, Bruce, ed. (2002). Oskar Schindler. People Who Made History. San Diego: Greenhaven Press. ISBN 0-7377-0894-8.
