= Stan Marks =

Australian writer and journalist

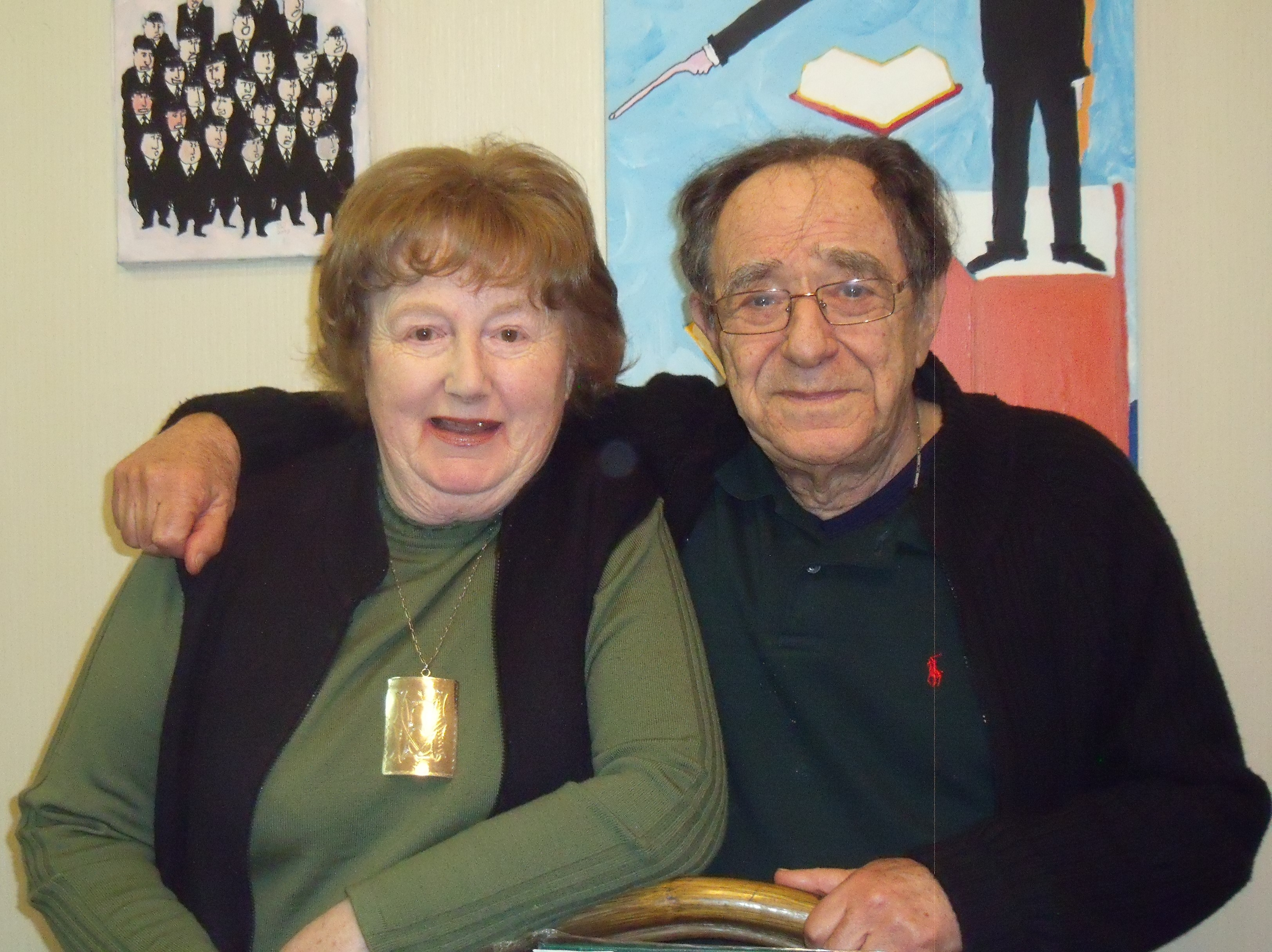
Stan Marks and his wife Eva Marks

Stan Marks is an Australian writer and journalist. He is the husband of Holocaust survivor Eva Marks.

== Life ==
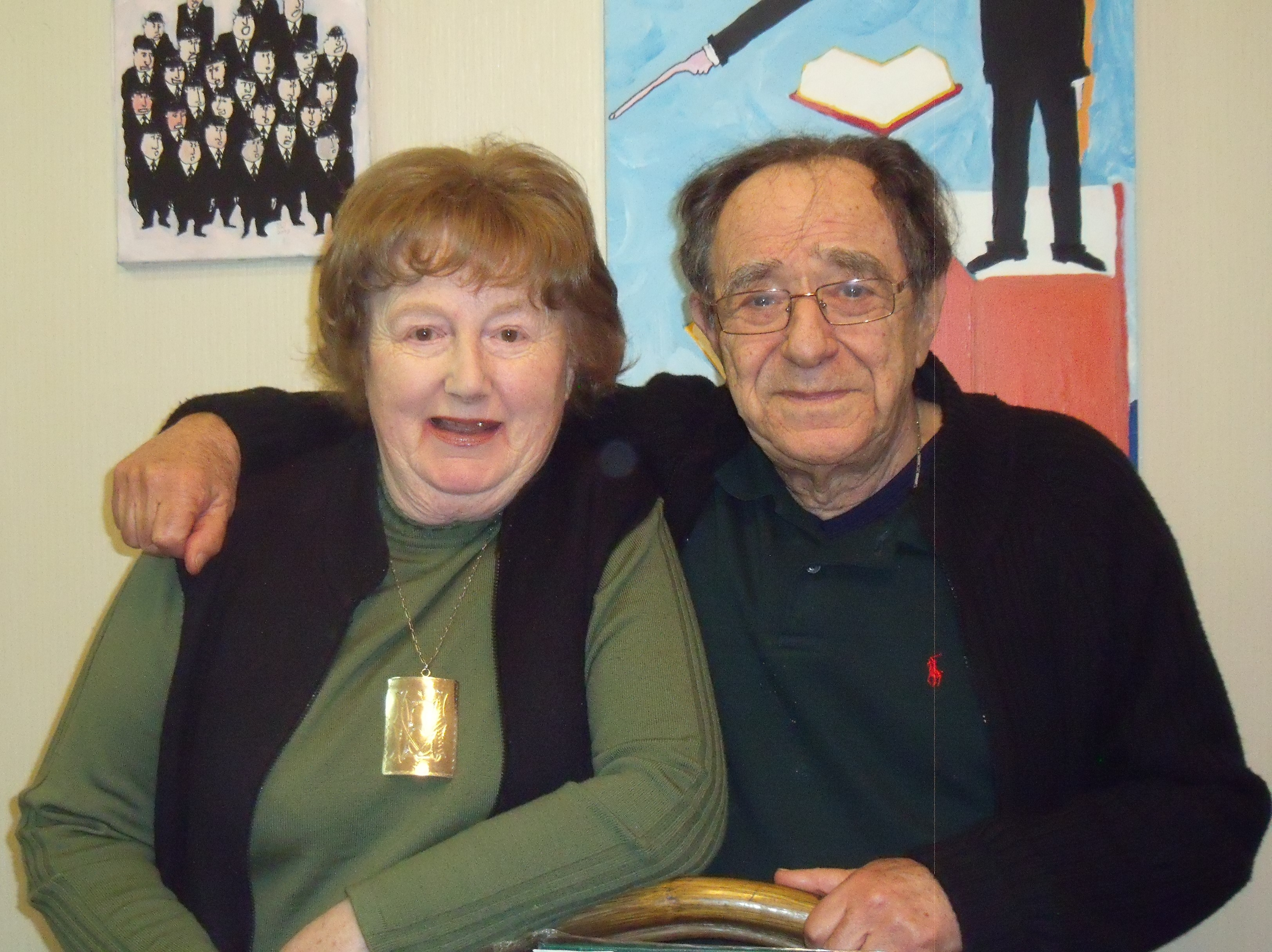
Eva and Stan Marks

Born in London, Marks moved to Australia aged two. He became a reporter on rural daily papers and then on the State's evening The Herald (Melbourne), reporting and acting as a critic in the Melbourne and Sydney offices. He worked in London, Canada and in New York City for Australian journals. Back in Australia, Stan Marks became Public Relations and Publicity Supervisor for the Australian Broadcasting Commission, looking after television, radio and concerts, including publicity for Isaac Stern, Yehudi Menuhin, Igor Stravinsky, Daniel Barenboim, Maureen Forrester and international orchestras for Radio Australia and the magazine TVTimes. Later he became Public Relations and Publicity Manager for the Australian Tourist Commission, writing articles for newspapers and journals at home and abroad. Marks was also the editor of the Centre News magazine of the Jewish Holocaust Museum and Research Centre for over 16 years.

He is the author of 14 books, published in Australia, England, United States, Israel and Denmark. He originated and co-wrote MS, a cartoon strip dealing with male-female relationships, which appeared daily in Australian and New Zealand newspapers. Marks wrote the play VIVE LA DIFFERENCE about male-female relations in the 21st century.

Stan Marks has given radio talks over BBC, CBC (Canada) and Australian Broadcasting Commission and to numerous groups, schools and organisations on many topics, particularly humour in all its forms. He has written much in Australia and overseas about fostering understanding and combating racism, hatred and prejudice, often advocating one united world. He wrote the first article (in the London Stage weekly) suggesting a British Commonwealth Arts Festival and then in various journals world wide. He also was first to suggest an Olympics Arts Festival as a way of possibly bringing the nations closer. A believer in bringing age-youth closer, including advocating, in the New York Times and other journals, a Youth Council at the United Nations and also later an Australian organization to help young and old to better understand each other and work together.

== Merits ==
- Order of Australia for community activities, 2007
- Glen Eira Citizen of the Year for community activities
- B'nai B'rith Merit award for services to the community

== Works ==
- God gave you one face (1966)
- Animal Olympics (1972)
- Rarua lives in Papua New Guinea (1973)
- Malvern sketchbook (1980)
- Out & About In Melbourne (1988)
- St Kilda heritage sketch book (1995)
- Reflections, 20 years 1984-2004 : Jewish Holocaust Museum and Research Centre Melbourne (2004)
