= Chiara Condello =

Italian winemaker

- Born: Forlì, Italy
- Education: Bocconi University, Milan
- Occupation: winemaker
- Years active: 2014–present
- Known for: Sangiovese wine

Chiara Condello is an Italian winemaker and winery owner based in Predappio, Emilia-Romagna, Italy. She grows Sangiovese grapes in an organic/biodynamic manner in the Romagna Sangiovese DOC and is considered a rising star female winemaker. Condello was born in Forlì and grew up in Fiumana di Predappio near her family winery, Conde. Her father Francesco Condello founded the Conde estate in 2001. The Predappio soil is complex and hospitable to grape growing, with a cooler climate than neighboring Tuscany.

Condello studied economics at Bocconi University in Milan and took over the business operations of her family estate at age 24. She then started farming her own grapes. Condello's first vintage was 2015, and she farms mostly Sangiovese wines in a biodynamic fashion on 4.8 hectares of land.
