= Hugo Höllenreiner =

Porajmos survivor

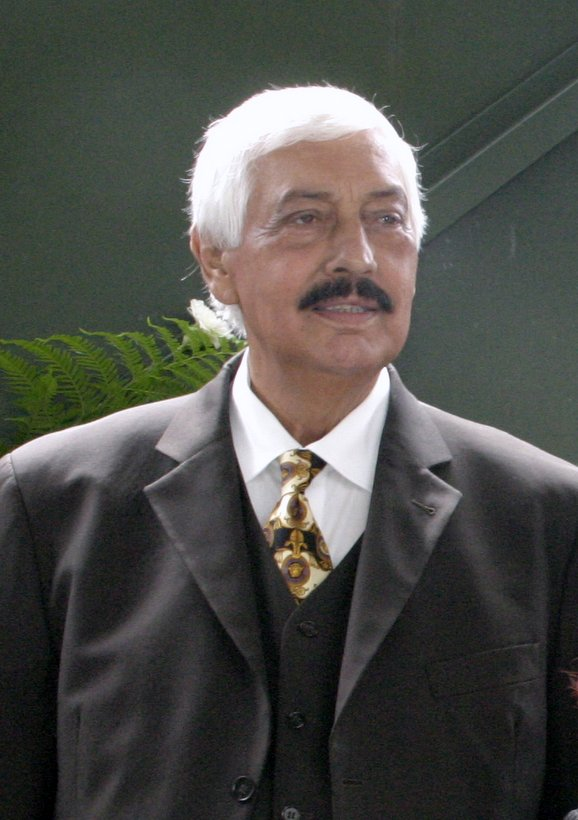
Hugo Höllenreiner (2009)

Hugo Adolf Höllenreiner (15 September 1933 – 10 June 2015) was a Sinti survivor of the Porajmos during the Nazi dictatorship.

== Life ==
Höllenreiner was born on 15 September 1933 in Munich, Germany. His parents chose his middle name in order to protect him from the growing threat of the Nazis. Still he was deported to the concentration camp Auschwitz on 16 March 1943, where Josef Mengele tortured him and his brother with cruel pseudomedical experiments. After being taken to the other concentration camps Ravensbrück and Mauthausen, he finally ended up in Bergen-Belsen. He, his five siblings, and both parents survived the Porajmos.

Since the late 1990s, Höllenreiner has given numerous lectures about his experiences. Höllenreiner lived in Ingolstadt.

== Awards and honors ==
Hugo Höllenreiner has received numerous awards and honors for his commitment as a contemporary witness of the National Socialist tyranny:

- In 2013 Höllenreiner received the Austrian Holocaust Memorial Award, an annual award conferred by the initiative Austrian Service Abroad. The awarding, where Charlotte Knobloch held an laudation, took place in the Jewish Museum Munich.
- On occasion of a memorial event on the 70. anniversary of the Roma revolt in Auschwitz-Birkenau, Höllenreiner received an honoring as an 'ambassador of humanity' in the Old Town Hall, Munich in 2014. The honor was conferred after a speech by Christian Ude, ex-mayor of Munich.
- In 2014 Höllenreiner was recipient of the honor-medal München leuchtet – Den Freundinnen und Freunden Münchens ("Munich aglow - dedicated to the friends of Munich"), awarded by the city munich, as 'an acknowledgement of his decade-long commitment in educational work as a contemporary witness of the National Socialist tyranny'. The medal was presented to him by the mayor of Munich, Dieter Reiter.

== Portrayal in literature, film and music ==
In numerous interviews with the author Anja Tuckermann, Höllenreiner has talked about his fate during the Nazi era. Tuckermann received the German Youth literature prize for her book "Denk nicht, wir bleiben hier!" The book also received numerous nominations for other literature prizes. In 2007 Angelus Mortis shot a documentary about Höllenreiner's fate. Adrian Coriolan Caspar did some interviews with Höllenreiner in 2008, which he implemented musically with his first orchestral work Symphonia Romani - Bari Duk, an oratorium for solo bass, mixed choir and orchestra.
