= Andreas Hörtnagl =

Austrian politician (born 1942)

Andreas Hörtnagl (born 28 November 1942) is an Austrian politician.

Born in Matrei am Brenner, Hörtnagl was mayor of Gries am Brenner from 1980 to 1992.

He became well known because of the conflict with his predecessor Jakob Strickner, who had praised himself in the German magazine Bunte because he had helped Josef Mengele to escape to Italy over the so-called Rat-Line. Hörtnagl was ashamed for the behaviour of his predecessor, and he regretted Strickland's attitude to holocaust survivors. Strickner sued him because of the offence of his honour; however he had no success before the court.

In 1991, at Bishop Reinhold Stecher's suggestion, mayor Hörtnagl arranged the first L’Arche community for disabled and able-bodied people, at Stecher's commune in Gries am Brenner. Also at Hörtnagl's instigation, Gries am Brenner became the first community in Austria which accepted 20 Romanian asylum seekers.

Hörtnagl he was not re-elected as a mayor in 1992. However the university Innsbruck and the Bishopric Innsbruck presented him high honours for his dedication.

In 1992 he and Andreas Maislinger arranged the Austrian Holocaust Memorial Service and gave young Austrian's the possibility to work in foreign holocaust memorial places. Since 2000 he has been assistant chairman of the Austrian Service Abroad.
