= Maletín =

- Municipality
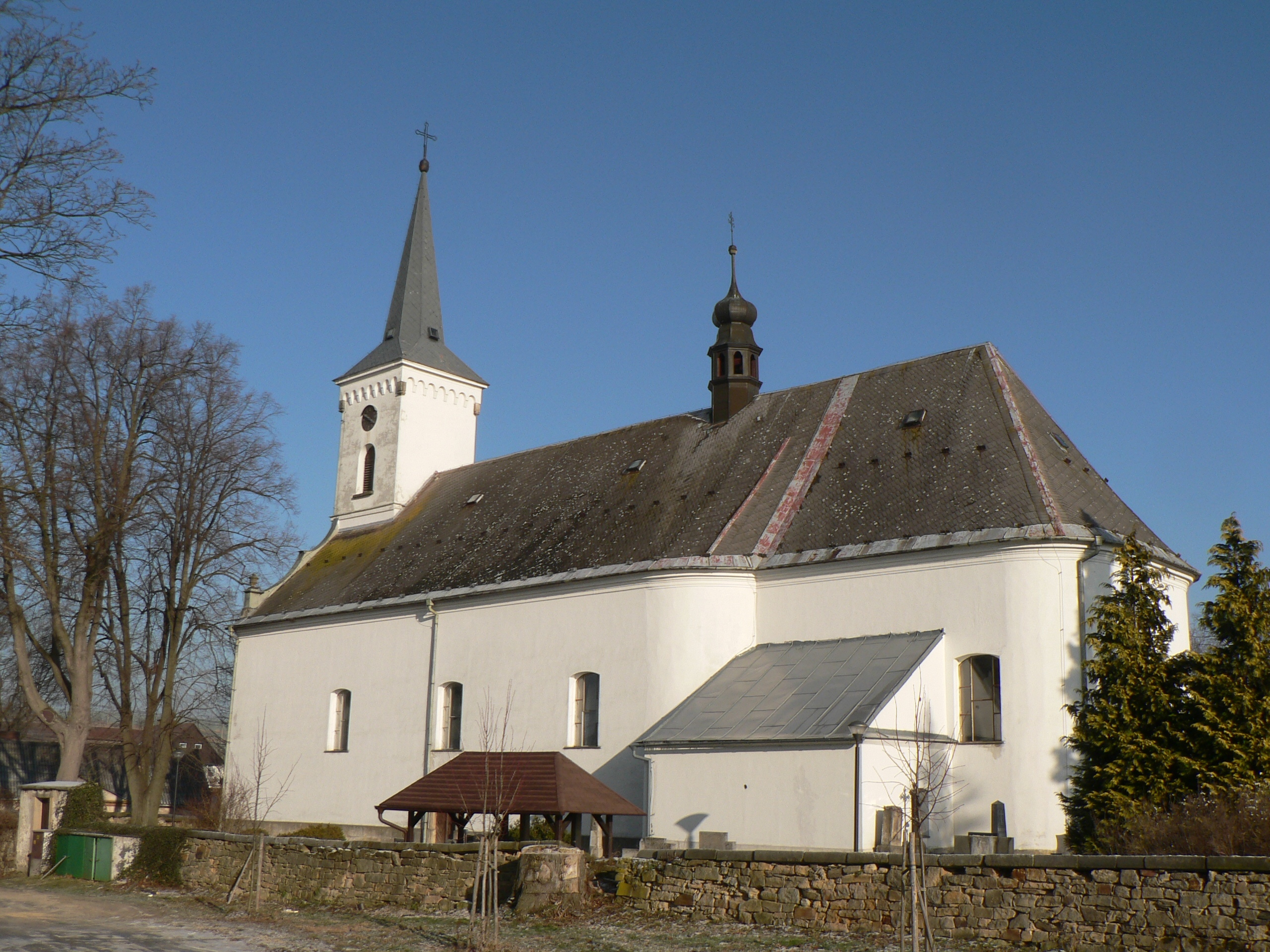
- Church of Saint Nicholas

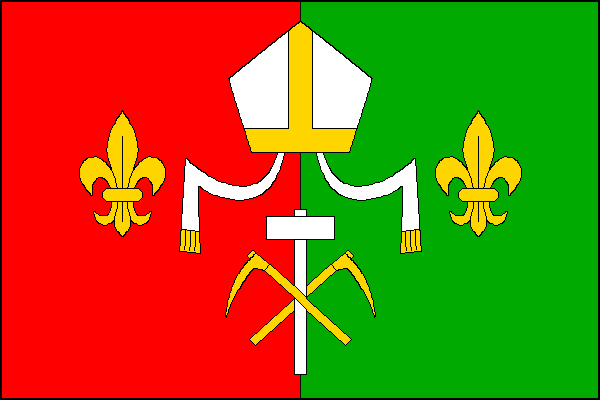
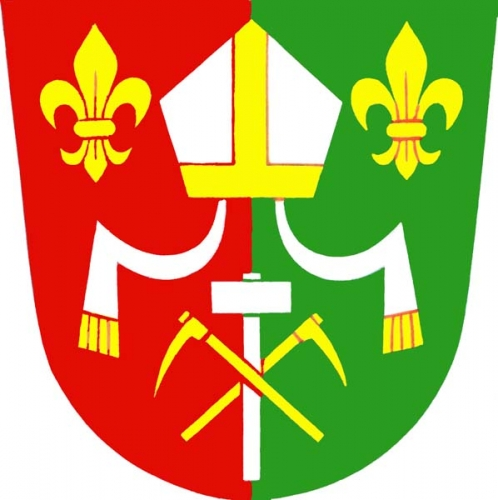
- Flag Coat of arms

- Location in the Czech Republic
- Coordinates: 49°46′55″N 16°47′7″E
- Country: Czech Republic
- Region: Olomouc
- District: Šumperk
- First mentioned: 1317

Area
  - Total: 18.56 km^{2} (7.17 sq mi)
- Elevation: 455 m (1,493 ft)

Population (2026-01-01)
  - Total: 449
  - Density: 24.2/km^{2} (62.7/sq mi)
- Time zone: UTC+1 (CET)
  - Summer (DST): UTC+2 (CEST)
- Postal codes: 789 01
- Website: www.maletin.cz

Maletín (German: Moletein) is a municipality in Šumperk District in the Olomouc Region of the Czech Republic. It has about 400 inhabitants.

Maletín lies approximately 23 kilometres (14 mi) south-west of Šumperk, 41 km (25 mi) north-west of Olomouc, and 173 km (107 mi) east of Prague.

== Administrative division ==
Maletín consists of three municipal parts (in brackets population according to the 2021 census):

- Starý Maletín (351)
- Nový Maletín (15)
- Javoří (26)

== Demographics ==
Historical population
Year	Pop.	±%
1869	2,134	—
1880	2,074	−2.8%
1890	2,216	+6.8%
1900	1,917	−13.5%
1910	1,684	−12.2%
1921	1,444	−14.3%
1930	1,341	−7.1%
1950	412	−69.3%
1961	389	−5.6%
1970	316	−18.8%
1980	293	−7.3%
1991	322	+9.9%
2001	368	+14.3%
2011	351	−4.6%
2021	392	+11.7%
Source: Censuses

== Notable people ==
- Emilie Schindler (1907–2001), Righteous among the Nations
