= Andreas Maislinger =

Austrian historian

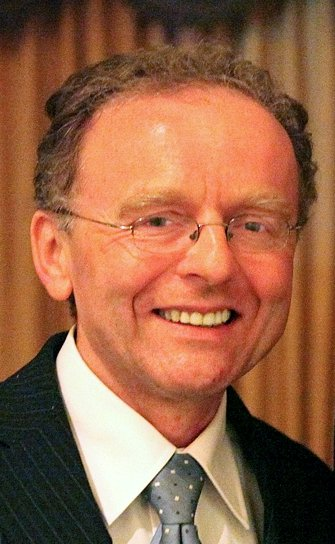
Maislinger in 2009

Andreas Maislinger (born 26 February 1955) is an Austrian political scientist and founder and former chairman of the Austrian Service Abroad. He is the founder of the Austrian Holocaust Memorial Award and the Braunau Contemporary History Days. In 2023, he resigned as chairman of the Austrian Service Abroad after several cases of severe misconduct committed by Maislinger came to light.

== Studying and learning ==
Maislinger was born in St. Georgen near Salzburg, Austria. He studied law and political science in Salzburg and political science and eastern-European history in Vienna, with study visits in, amongst others, Frankfurt am Main and Innsbruck. During his studies in Salzburg, Maislinger advocated for Austrian participation in the International Youth Meeting Center in Oświęcim/Auschwitz; Austrian president Rudolf Kirchschläger declined. Kirchschläger later acknowledged the value of Maislinger's proposal of civilian service for reconciliation and atonement related to the Holocaust.

In 1980 he received his doctorate for a dissertation on the problems of Austrian defense policy. He subsequently held posts at the Institute for Political Science at the University of Innsbruck, the University of New Orleans as visiting assistant professor, the Humboldt University of Berlin for a research visit, and the Hebrew University of Jerusalem.

In 1982 he co-founded the working group of independent peace initiatives of Austria and in 1986 he became a member of the founding committee of the Austrian-Israeli society Tirol. Until 1996, he published columns in the "Jüdische Rundschau" (Jewish Review).

== Austrian Gedenkdienst ==
Together with Andreas Hörtnagl, Maislinger founded the Gedenkdienst (Austrian Holocaust Memorial Service). He successfully pleaded for the legal establishment of this kind of alternative to mandatory military service, aiming at promoting education and raising awareness about the Holocaust.

On 1 September 1992 the first young Austrian started his Gedenkdienst at the Museum Auschwitz-Birkenau. Since then more the 1000 Gedenkdiener served in 23 countries worldwide. Prominent supporters of this program include Simon Wiesenthal, Teddy Kollek, Ari Rath and Gerhard Röthler.

In 1998 he founded the Austrian Service Abroad with Andreas Hörtnagl and Michael Prochazka, adding the Austrian Social Service and the Austrian Peace Service to the portfolio.

In October and November 2009 Andreas Maislinger made a 3-week lecturing and promotion tour through Canada and the United States.

In May 2023, Maislinger stepped down as chairman of the Austrian Service Abroad after public criticism.

== House of Responsibility (HRB) ==
As a reaction to the participation of the FPÖ (Austrian Freedom Party) in the Austrian federal government in 2000, Maislinger suggested that the city of Braunau am Inn should establish a "House of Responsibility" in the birth house of Adolf Hitler.

== Abuse allegations and resignation ==
In May 2023 the Austrian weekly news magazine Falter published severe accusations against Maislinger. He was accused of systematically harassing young memorial service volunteers, some of whom were minors. The allegations included, among other things, documented threats of suicide and legal action.

Maislinger called one volunteer and threatened him with suicide, saying, "You'll have to live with the fact that I'm going to kill myself now.", according to Austrian news station Puls 24. Jonathan Dorner, who was doing his Gedenkdienst in 2019, was also the target of a suicide threat and numerous other threats after he had contradicted Maislinger and addressed problematic circumstances. Dorner sees a system in these threats; the announcement of his suicide was used against the young people in the association "to get his way when something did not go according to his plan." Furthermore, threats of criminal charges were also alleged. In response to an inquiry by Austrian newspaper Kurier, Maislinger commented that the allegations had been clarified with the help of an ombudsman team two years ago and that he had no intention of participating in a public discussion.

The Ministry of Social Affairs, which is supporting the organization financially, had been aware of the allegations since the fall of 2022, according to Puls 24. A suspension of funding would have been unreasonable based on the state of knowledge at the time, the ministry commented in response to an ORF query. Three days after the allegations were made public, Maislinger announced his resignation as Chairman of the Austrian Service Abroad. An external investigation of the allegations came to the conclusion that there had been cases of abuse of power by Maislinger. The organizational structure had been adjusted to prevent a similar concentration of power as had occurred under Maislinger.

== Further activities ==
Since 1992, Maislinger has served as the scientific director of the annual Braunau Contemporary History Days in Braunau am Inn.

He also participates actively in projects promoting gifted children.

Since 2003 he is in charge of the Georg Rendl Symposion. He had founded the symposium to familiarise people with the life and works of the painter and author Georg Rendl, whom Maislinger had already met as a child in his hometown St. Georgen/Salzburg.

In 2006 he initiated the Austrian Holocaust Memorial Award, rewarding people who actively contribute to the remembrance of the Holocaust.

== Awards ==
In 2005 Maislinger received the Decoration of Honour in Silver for Services to the Republic of Austria from the president of Austria, Heinz Fischer, and the Medal of Merit of the state of Tirol from Herwig van Staa and Luis Durnwalder.

On 8 November 2009 Andreas Maislinger was awarded with a Lifetime Achievement Award for "his 10 year fight to obtain official recognition of alternative, philanthropic service" at the Annual Dinner of the Los Angeles Museum of the Holocaust together with Holocaust survivor and producer of Schindler's List Branko Lustig.

On 2 October 2012 Andreas Maislinger was awarded the Ordre national du Mérite issued by the president of France Nicolas Sarkozy in the French embassy in Vienna.

== Publications ==
(Selection)

- "Friedensbewegung in einem neutralen Land. Zur neuen Friedensbewegung in Österreich. (Peace movement in a neutral country. Related to the new peace movement in Austria.) In: Medienmacht im Nord-Süd-Konflikt". (The power of media in the north – south conflict.) Suhrkamp, Frankfurt am Main 1984 ISBN 3-518-11166-3
- "'Neue' Österreichische Friedensbewegung". ("New“ Austrian Peace Movement.) In: Österreichisches Jahrbuch für Politik 1983. (Austrian Annual for Politics 1983.) Vienna, 1984
- "Das katholisch-konservative Lager". (The catholic – conservative side.) In: Widerstand und Verfolgung in Tirol 1934–1945, Band 2. ÖBV, (Resistance and Persecution in Tirol 1934–1945, Band 2. Austrian book publisher), Vienna 1984 ISBN 3-215-05368-3
- "'Den Nationalsozialisten in die Hände getrieben'. Zur Geschichtspolitik der SPÖ von 1970 bis 2000". ("Drifted into the National Socialists Hands“. Related to the history politics of the Socialists in Austria from 1970 to 2000.) In: Europäische Rundschau, (European review), number 3/2001

=== Publishing ===
- Costa Rica. Politik, Gesellschaft und Kultur eines Staates mit ständiger aktiver und unbewaffneter Neutralität. (Costa Rica, Politics, Society and Culture of a State with Continuous Active and Unarmed Neutrality.) Inn-Verlag, Innsbruck 1986 ISBN 3-85123-091-4
- Der Putsch von Lamprechtshausen. Zeugen des Juli 1934 berichten. (The Putsch of Lamprechtshausen. Report of Witness to July, 1934), Self - published, Innsbruck 1992 ISBN 3-901201-00-9

== See also ==
- Austrian Holocaust Memorial Award
- Austrian Holocaust Memorial Service
- Austrian Service Abroad
- Braunau Contemporary History Days
- House of Responsibility
