= Predappio =

Predappio La Pré / Dviais (Romagnol)
- Comune
- Comune di Predappio
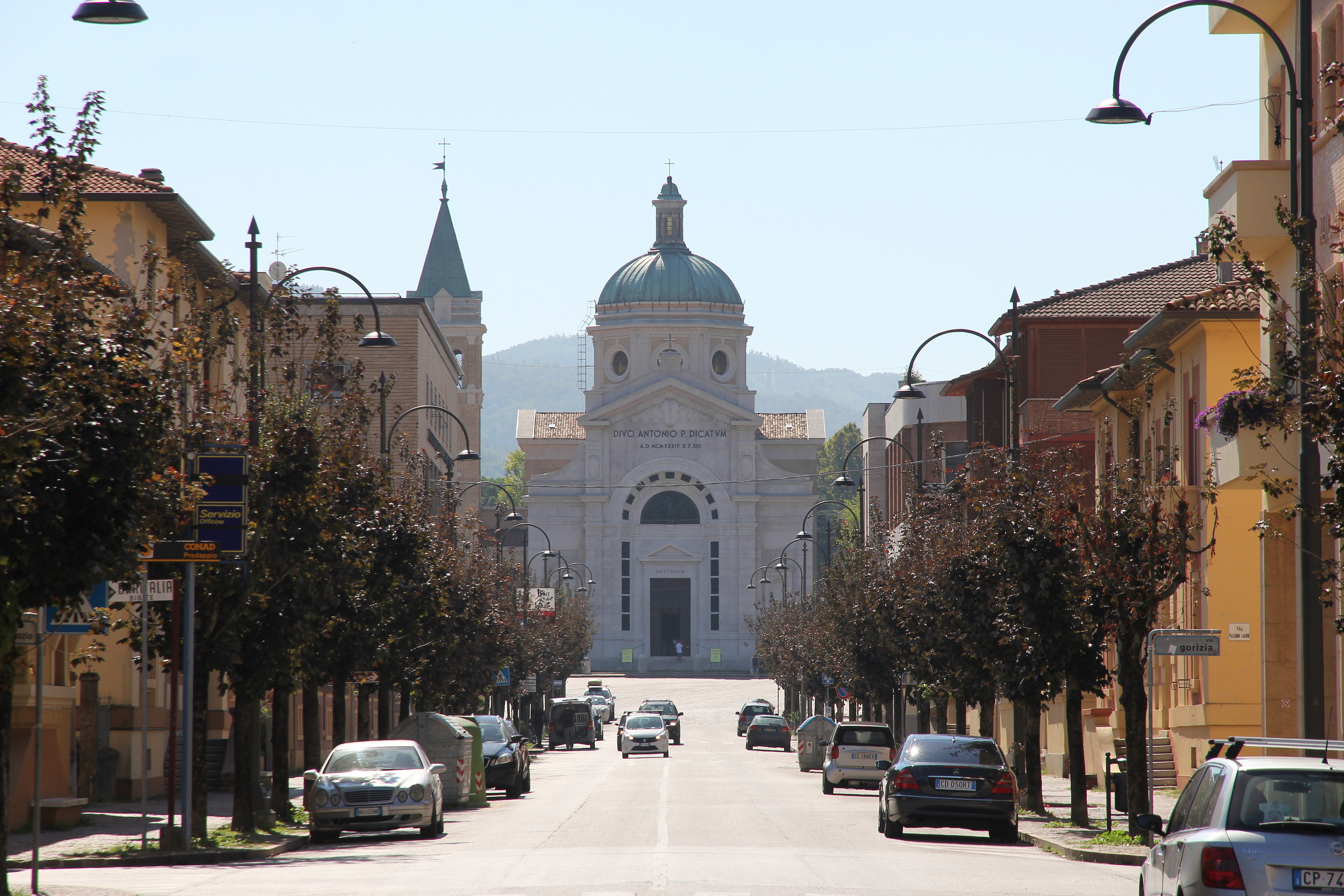
- The Church of Sant'Antonio as seen from the main street in Predappio

- Coat of arms

- Location within Italy Location within Emilia-Romagna
- Coordinates: 44°06′N 11°59′E
- Country: Italy
- Region: Emilia-Romagna
- Province: Forlì-Cesena (FC)
- Frazioni: Fiumana, Predappio Alta, Rocca delle Caminate, Tontola, Colmano, Fiordinano, Marsignano, Monte Colombo, Monte Mirabello, Montemaggiore, Porcentico, Riggiano, San Cassiano in Pennino, San Cristoforo, San Savino, Sant'Agostino, Santa Lucia, Santa Marina, Trivella

Government
  - Mayor: Roberto Canali

Area
  - Total: 91.39 km^{2} (35.29 sq mi)
- Elevation: 133 m (436 ft)

Population (1-1-2021)
  - Total: 6,135
  - Density: 67.13/km^{2} (173.9/sq mi)
- Demonym: Predappiese(i)
- Time zone: UTC+1 (CET)
  - Summer (DST): UTC+2 (CEST)
- Postal code: 47016
- Dialing code: +39 0543
- Patron saint: Anthony of Padua
- Saint day: 13 June
- Website: Official website

Predappio (/preɪˈdɑːpioʊ/ pray-DAH-pee-oh, Italian: [preˈdappjo]; Romagnol: La Pré or Dviais) is a comune (municipality) in the province of Forlì-Cesena, in the Italian region of Emilia-Romagna, with a population of 6,135 as of 1 January 2021. The town is best known for being the birthplace of Benito Mussolini, founder of the National Fascist Party (PNF) and dictator of Fascist Italy from 1922 to 1943. Mussolini is buried in Predappio, and his mausoleum is a local tourist destination, as well as a site of pilgrimage for Italian neo-fascists.

== History ==
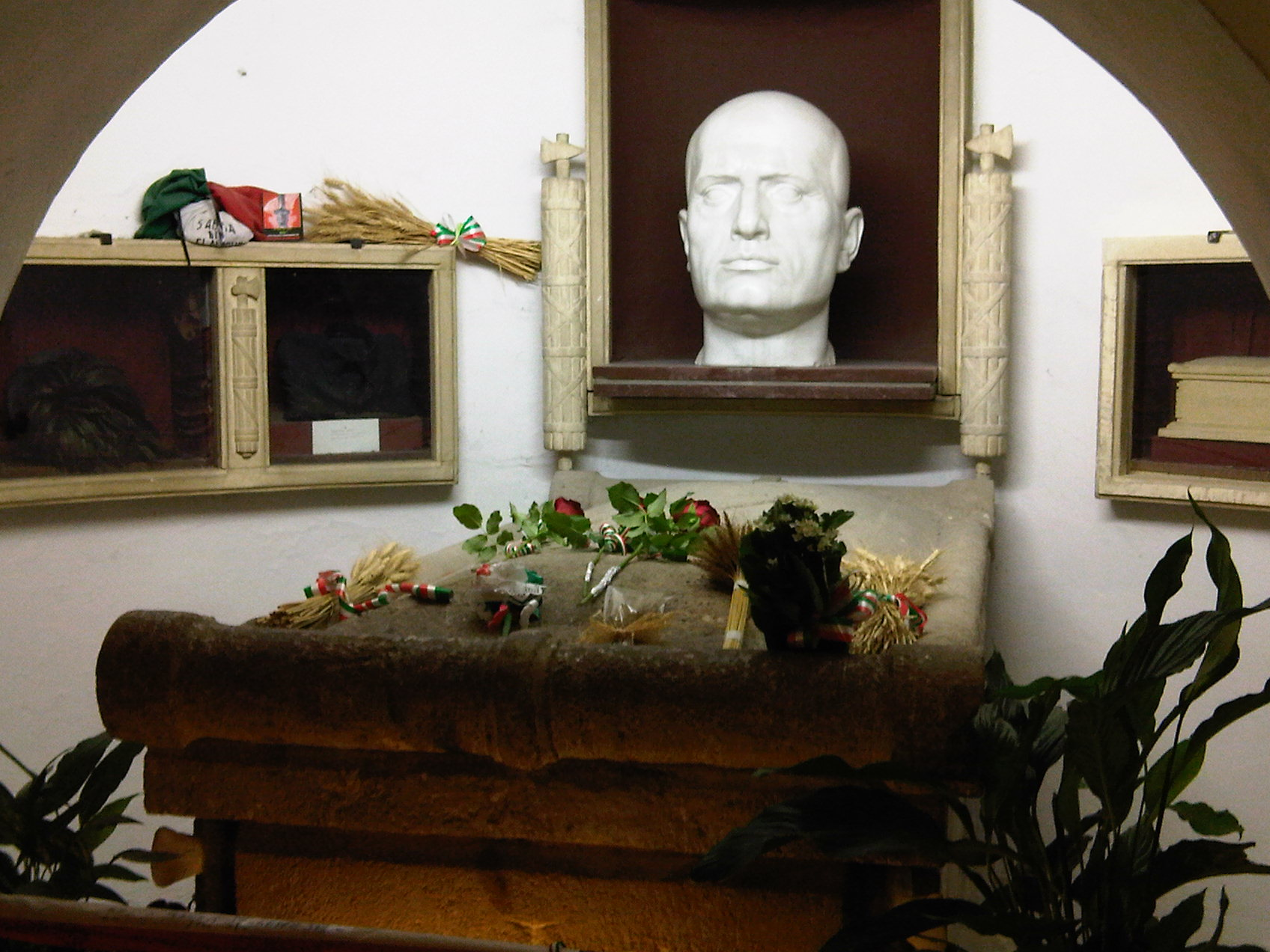
The tomb of Benito Mussolini is a tourist destination in Predappio.

From its origins (possibly Roman) until the 1920s, Predappio was a rural town of modest size, situated on the hills of Forlì. Augustus divided Italy into eleven provinces and Predappio was within the sixth province. It is believed that the town name derives from the installation in those locations of an ancient Roman family: the Appi. The town was accordingly named Praesidium Domini Appi, abbreviated to Pre.DiAppi.

Historically, the town developed around the medieval castle, looking down the valley. Along the valley, about 2 kilometres (1.2 mi) from Predappio, the town was known as Dovia (probably a corruption of the local Roman road Duo Via, Two-Way).

Benito Mussolini was born in Predappio in 1883. After a landslide hit the town in the winter of 1923/24 and left many people homeless, the government decided to build a bigger, more prestigious township to celebrate the birthplace of Mussolini, following the architectural dictates of the emerging Fascist Italy. Along with the nearby town of Forlì, Predappio was given the title of La Città del Duce ("The City of the Leader"), after the title taken by Mussolini as Italian dictator.

Predappio has become a site of pilgrimage for Italian and other neo-fascists, with this development drawing criticism and protests from anti-fascists.

In April 2009, the town council banned the sale of fascist souvenirs. In 2014, Mayor Giorgio Frassineti announced plans to build in the town "a museum dedicated to the history of fascism". The mayor, who was standing for re-election as a member of the centre-left Democratic Party, stated that the aim of the council's decision was to have people remember a "fundamental piece of [Italian] history" so that "Predappio would become a place for reflection – cutting the town from the hands of those who want to misuse it." As of early 2016, the museum's construction was still pending, but sale of fascist souvenirs was again permitted in the town.

In 2019, Brothers of Italy-backed Roberto Canali was elected as mayor of Predappio, ending the more than 70 years of left-wing rule in Predappio. On 24 July 2019, Canali announced plans to open Mussolini's crypt to the public all year round. Canali said that he wanted to promote the tomb as a tourist attraction to boost the local economy.

== Sister cities ==
- Breuna, Germany
- Kenderes, Hungary

== Notable people ==
- Benito Mussolini (1883–1945), politician and dictator of Fascist Italy from 1922 to 1943
- Edvige Mussolini (1888–1952), Benito Mussolini's sister
- Rachele Mussolini (1890–1979), Benito Mussolini's wife
- Adone Zoli (1887–1960), Prime Minister of Italy
- Benito Partisani (1906–1969), artist
- Pino Romualdi (1913–1988), politician and journalist
- Ivano Nicolucci (1930–2002), musician
- Andrea Emiliani (1931), art historian
- Vittorio Emiliani (1935), politician and journalist
- Gilberto Cappelli (1952), composer and painter
- Marino Amadori (1957), cyclist
- Giorgio Canali (1958), musician and singer
- Chiara Condello (fl 2016), winemaker
