= Alberto Dines =

Brazilian journalist and writer

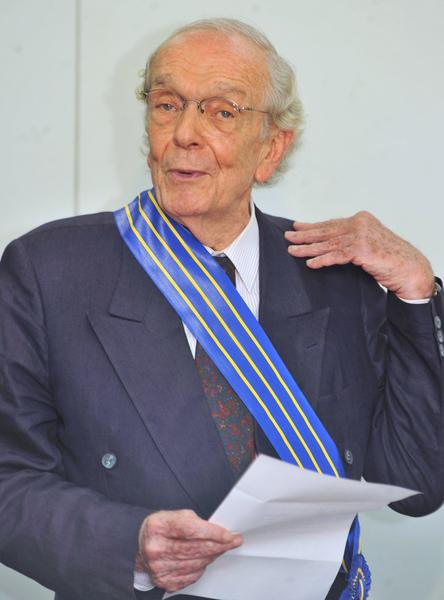
- Dines receiving the Roberto Marinho Prize for Communication on March 29, 2010.
- Born: February 19, 1932; Rio de Janeiro, Rio de Janeiro
- Died: May 22, 2018 (aged 86)
- Occupations: Journalist, writer

Alberto Dines (Portuguese pronunciation: [awˈbɛʁ.tu ˈd͡ʒĩ.nis]; February 19, 1932 – May 22, 2018) was a Brazilian journalist and writer.

== Biography ==
With a career spanning over five decades, Dines directed and launched several magazines and newspapers in Brazil and Portugal. He has taught journalism since 1963, and was a visiting professor at the Columbia University School of Journalism in 1974.

Dines was the editor in chief of Jornal do Brasil for twelve years, in addition to coordinating the Rio de Janeiro branch of Folha de S.Paulo. He was also the director of Grupo Abril in Portugal, where he launched the Exame magazine.

After years of dodging the military dictatorship censorship as the editor in chief of Jornal do Brazil, Dines was fired in June 1974 for publishing an article criticizing the overtly amicable relationship between the owners of the newspaper and the state government of Rio de Janeiro.

In addition to working as a journalist, Dines has written over 15 books, including Death in Paradise, the Tragedy of Stefan Zweig (1981) and Fire Links – Antônio José da Silva, the Jew and other stories of the Inquisition in Portugal and Brazil (1992). His book about Stefan Zweig was adapted into the film Lost Zweig (2002), directed by Sylvio Back. Dines also discussed Zweig in a documentary by the same director.

In April 1996, Dines launched the groundbreaking Observatório da Imprensa website. The media analysis website was later adapted into a weekly TV show, currently aired by TV Brasil, and a daily radio show, aired on public stations.

== Awards ==
- 1970: Maria Moors Cabot Prize
- 2005: Prêmio Imprensa Estrangeira
- October 2007: Austrian Holocaust Memorial Award
- 2009: Austrian Cross of Honour for Science and Art
- March 29, 2010: Roberto Marinho Prize for Communication (Brazil)

== Works ==
- Morte no paraíso, a tragédia de Stefan Zweig, Editora Nova Fronteira (1981), Editora Rocco (2004)
- Tod im Paradies. Die Tragödie des Stefan Zweig, Edition Büchergilde (2006)
