= Observatório da Imprensa =

Brazilian media outlet and television and radio program

- Genre: Broadcast journalism
- Presented by: Alberto Dines
- Country of origin: Brazil
- No. of seasons: 11
- No. of episodes: 502

Production
- Running time: Approximately 1 hour (per episode)

Original release
- Network: TV Cultura (1998-2008); TVE Brasil (1998-2007); TV Brasil (2008-present)
- Release: May 1998 – present

Observatório da Imprensa
- Genre: Current affairs, media
- Running time: 30 mins
- Country of origin: Brazil
- Language: Portuguese
- Home station: Cultura FM and AM (São Paulo)
- Syndicates: MEC AM (Rio de Janeiro); Nacional AM and FM (Brasília); Inconfidência AM and FM (Belo Horizonte); Universidade Federal FM (Rio Grande)
- Starring: Alberto Dines
- Narrated by: Luciano Martins
- Original release: May 2005 – Present
- No. of series: 5
- No. of episodes: 1012
- Website: Observatório da Imprensa

Observatório da Imprensa (Portuguese pronunciation: [ob.seʁ.vaˈtɔ.ɾi.u da ĩˈpɾẽ.sɐ]; lit. 'Press Observer') is a Brazilian website, and also television and radio programs, which focuses on the analysis of the current state of the mass media in the country.

== History ==
Observatório da Imprensa was launched in April 1996 as a website, edited by Alberto Dines. It was an initiative of the Institute for the Development of Journalism (Projor) and an original project of the Laboratory for Advanced Studies in Journalism (Labjor) of the Universidade Estadual de Campinas (Unicamp). It is currently funded by the Ford Foundation.

In May 1998, Observatório da Imprensa was launched as a weekly TV program, hosted by Dines and produced by public broadcasters TV Cultura and TVE Brasil (currently TV Brasil). On 2008, the São Paulo State government, which maintains TV Cultura, announced that it would cancel the program, which is currently produced by federal government-run TV Brasil only.

In May 2005, Observatório da Imprensa was launched as a radio program, broadcast daily on public and educational networks. The programs are available in the website as podcasts.

== Broadcast ==
Observatório da Imprensa is broadcast on several public and educational radio and television networks throughout Brazil.

=== Television ===
Location	Station	Schedule (Brasília time zone)	Rerun
Aracaju	TV Aperipê	Tuesday, 10:40 p.m.	n/a
Belo Horizonte	Rede Minas	Tuesday, 10:40 p.m.	n/a
Boa Vista	TV Universitária	Tuesday, 10:40 p.m.	Saturday, 8 p.m.
Brasília	TV Nacional	Tuesday, 10:40 p.m.	n/a
Cuiabá	TV Universidade	Tuesday, 10:40 p.m.	Saturday, 8 p.m.
Florianópolis	TV Cultura Santa Catarina	Tuesday, 10:40 p.m.	n/a
Fortaleza	TVE Ceará	Tuesday, 10:40 p.m.	n/a
Goiânia	TV Brasil Central	Tuesday, 10:40 p.m.	n/a
João Pessoa	TV Miramar	Tuesday, 10:40 p.m.	Saturday, 8 p.m.
Maceió	TVE Maceió	Tuesday, 10:40 p.m.	n/a
Manaus	TV Cultura Amazonas	Tuesday, 10:40 p.m.	n/a
Natal	TV Universitária RN	Tuesday, 10:40 p.m.	n/a
Palmas	TV Palmas	Tuesday, 10:40 p.m.	n/a
Porto Alegre	TVE Rio Grande do Sul	Tuesday, 10:40 p.m.	n/a
Recife	TV Universitária do Recife	Tuesday, 10:40 p.m.	n/a
Rio Branco	TV Aldeia	Tuesday, 10:40 p.m.	n/a
Rio de Janeiro	TV Brasil	Tuesday, 10:40 p.m.	n/a
Salvador	TVE Bahia	Tuesday, 10:40 p.m.	n/a
São Luís	TVE Maranhão	Tuesday, 10:40 p.m.	Saturday, 8 p.m.
São Paulo	TV Cultura	Wednesday, 12:10 a.m.	n/a
Teresina	TV Antares	Tuesday, 10:40 p.m.	Saturday, 8 p.m.
Vitória	TVE Espírito Santo	Tuesday, 10:40 p.m.	n/a

=== Radio ===
Location	Schedule (Brasília time zone)	Station
Belo Horizonte	Inconfidência AM (880 kHz) and FM (100,9 mHz)	Daily at 9:30 a.m. (AM) and 11:55 (FM)
Brasília	Nacional FM (96,1 mHz) and AM (980 kHz)	Daily at 10:30 a.m. (FM) and 12:30 (AM)
Rio de Janeiro	MEC AM (800 kHz)	Daily at 10:30 a.m.
Rio Grande	Universidade Federal FM (106,7 mHz)	Daily at 11:30 a.m.
São Paulo	Cultura FM (103,3 mHz) and AM (1200 kHz)	Daily at 9 a.m.
