= Martha Bissmann =

Austrian politician (born 1980)

Martha Bißmann
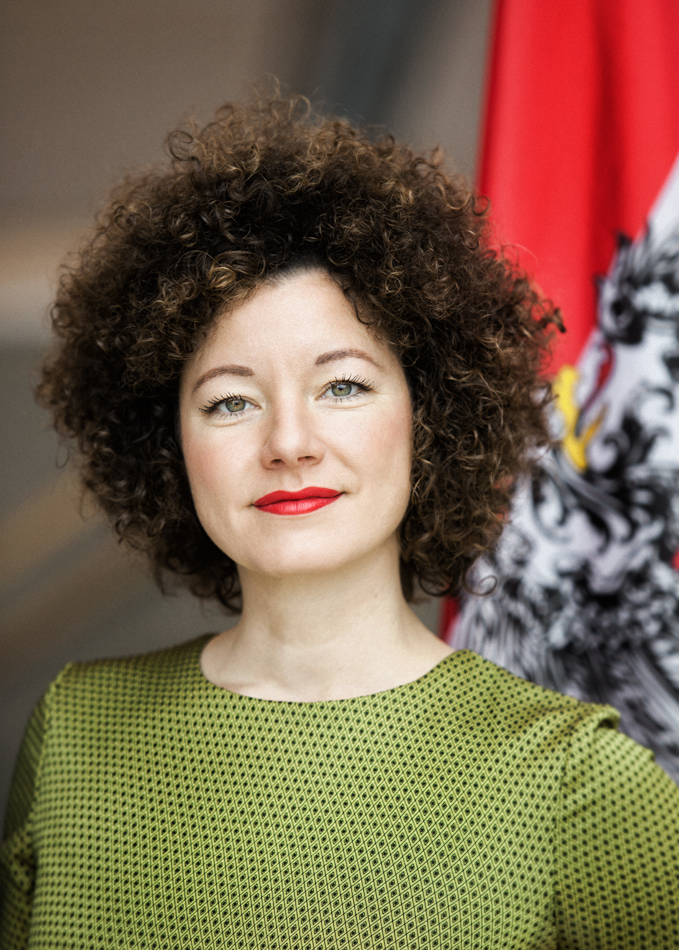
- Bißmann in 2018

Member of the National Council
- In office 9 November 2017 – 29 September 2019

Personal details
- Born: Martha Bißmann; 23 March 1980 (age 46) Graz, Styria
- Party: Social Austria of the Future (since 2020); Peter Pilz List (JETZT) (2017–2018)

Martha Bißmann (born 23 March 1980) is an Austrian politician. She served in the National Council from 2017 to 2019, entering as a member of the Peter Pilz List after its leader Peter Pilz withdrew. She was expelled from the party in July 2018, and thereafter served as an independent deputy. She did not seek re-election in the 2019 election. Prior to this, she was campaign manager for independent candidate Irmgard Griss during her 2016 presidential bid.

Bißmann is the lead candidate of the minor party Social Austria of the Future (SÖZ) in the 2020 Viennese state election.

== Biography ==
Bißmann grew up as the eighth of nine children in Graz. She studied energy and environmental Management at the Burgenland University of Applied Sciences, and graduated in 2006. During her studies, she was active in the intercultural exchange program and club culture series Brighton Calling, which initiated and organized political programming. Bißmann is co-founder of the ELEVATE festival for contemporary music and political discourse in Graz. From 2003 to 2005 she was a board member of the Styrian Education Workshop of The Greens.

She wrote her diploma thesis, which examined the technical and economic possibilities for wind-driven seawater desalination, while working as an energy expert in an Austrian Agency for Development Cooperation (ADA) project in Cape Verde. After graduation, she moved to Munich and worked as a project manager for EU-funded sustainability campaigns and research network projects on climate protection and renewable energy. The climate protection campaign Energy Union which Bißmann initiated placed second in the 2013 Sustainable Energy Europe Award. She also worked on an EEMusic Energy Efficient Music Culture project which networked and trained festivals and club operators from 28 European countries in climate protection.

== Political career ==
At the beginning of 2016, Bißmann worked as a campaign manager for the presidential campaign of Irmgard Griss. From July to August 2017 she was head of the direct democracy campaign Österreich Entscheidung (Austria Decides) in Vienna. In the 2017 federal election, she ran as a candidate for the Peter Pilz List. She was second on the party's list in her home state of Styria, behind party leader Peter Pilz. The party won one seat in Styria, which was filled by Pilz. However, Pilz declined to take the seat after sexual assault allegations against him surfaced at the beginning of November, and the seat passed to Bißmann. She thus entered the National Council. She became the Pilz group spokesperson for the environment, energy, transport, agriculture, development cooperation, sport, and citizen participation.

During the legislative period, tensions grew between Bißmann and the Pilz party, especially after she refused to give up her seat when Peter Pilz sought to re-enter parliament, despite being offered major concessions such as the position of party chairperson. She was threatened with expulsion from the parliamentary group in June, but an agreement was negotiated in which Bißmann resigned her party membership but remained within the group. Nonetheless, just a month later on 19 July 2018, Bißmann was expelled from the Pilz group. After this point she served as a non-attached deputy in the National Council. During her time in the legislature, she stated she sought to promote climate protection and defend the rights of minorities in Austria. She was one of the most active members of parliament, delivering 69 speeches in her two years as deputy.

Bißmann did not seek re-election during the 2019 federal election, choosing to leave the National Council. In 2020, she announced she would run for the Viennese parliament as the lead candidate of minor party Social Austria of the Future (SÖZ).
