= Pan Guang =

Chinese academic

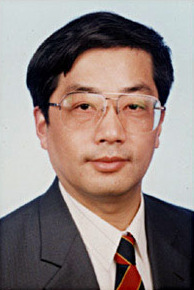
Pan Guang

Pan Guang (Chinese: 潘光; pinyin: Pān Guāng; born June 7, 1947) is the Director of and Professor at the Shanghai Center for International Studies and Institute of European & Asian Studies at the Shanghai Academy of Social Sciences, Director of SCO (Shanghai Cooperation Organisation) Studies Center in Shanghai, Dean of Center of Jewish Studies Shanghai (CJSS), and Vice Chairman of the Chinese Society of Middle East Studies.

Pan Guang was born in Shanghai and raised in Hainan province in south China. He studied at Renmin University in Beijing, and at East China Normal University in Shanghai. He holds a bachelor of political science and a Ph.D. in history. Furthermore, he is a council member of the Asia Society in the United States, Senior Advisor of the China-Eurasia Forum in the United States, Advisory Board Member of the Asia Europe Journal in Singapore and Senior Advisor on Anti-terror Affairs to the Mayor of Shanghai. In 1993 he received the James Friend Annual Memorial Award for Sino-Jewish Studies, in 1996 the Special Award for Research on Canadian Jews from China, in 2004 the Saint Petersburg-300 Medal for Contribution to China-Russia Relations awarded by President Vladimir Putin and in 2006 the Austrian Holocaust Memorial Award. Furthermore, he was nominated by UN Secretary-General Kofi Annan as a member of the High-Level Group for the Alliance of Civilizations in 2005. Pan had months-long discussions with the Chinese government to help re-open an historical synagogue in Shanghai in 2008.

== Publications ==
- The Jews in China
- Open Door Policy in Asia, Africa and Latin America
- Selected Works on Arab African History
- US War on Iraq (2003)
- From Silk Road to ASEM: 2000 years of Asia-Europe Relations
- China—Central Asia-Russia Relations
- SCO and China's Role in the War on Terrorism
- Contemporary International Crises
- China's Success in the Middle East
- China's Anti-terror Strategy and China's Role in the War on Terror
- Islam and Confucianism: the Development of Chinese Islam
- Ethnic and Religious Conflicts in Pacific Rim Area
- China and Post-Soviet Central Asia
- China's Energy Strategy
- Jewish Refugees in China (1939–1945): History, Perspective and Chinese Model (2017)

== See also ==
Center of Jewish Studies Shanghai
