= Branko Lustig =

Croatian film producer (1932–2019)

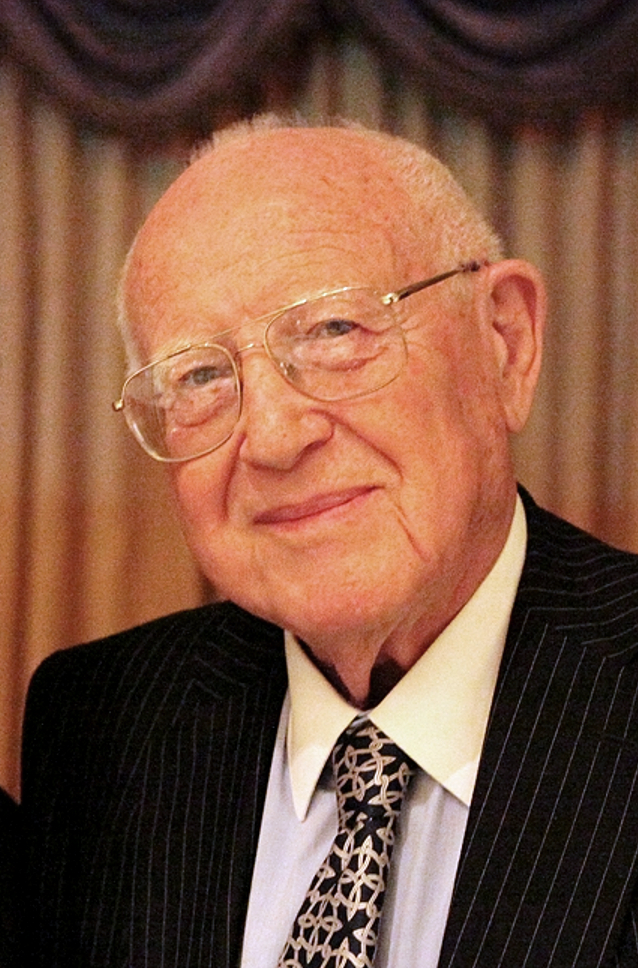
- Lustig at the LAMOTH 2nd Annual Dinner in 2009
- Born: 10 June 1932; Osijek, Sava Banovina, Kingdom of Yugoslavia
- Died: 14 November 2019 (aged 87); Zagreb, Croatia
- Occupation: Film producer
- Years active: 1955–2019
- Spouse: Mirjana Lustig (m. 1970)
- Children: 1
- Parents: Mirko Lustig; Vilma Gütter

Branko Lustig (10 June 1932 – 14 November 2019) was a Croatian film producer best known for winning Academy Awards for Best Picture for Schindler's List and Gladiator. He is the only person born in the territory of present-day Croatia to have won two Academy Awards.

== Early life ==
Lustig was born in Osijek, Kingdom of Yugoslavia to a Croatian Jewish family. His father, Mirko, was head-waiter at an Osijek Café Central, and his mother, Vilma (Gütter), was a housewife. Lustig's grandparents, unlike his parents, were religious and he regularly attended the local synagogue with them.

During World War II, as a child he was imprisoned for two years in Auschwitz and Bergen-Belsen. Most members of his family perished in the death camps throughout Europe, including his grandmother who was killed in the gas chamber, while his father was killed in Čakovec on 15 March 1945. Lustig's mother survived the Holocaust and was reunited with him after the war. On the day of the liberation, he weighed only 66 pounds (29.94 kg). Lustig credited his survival in Auschwitz to a German officer who happened to be from the same suburb of Osijek as Lustig. He overheard Lustig crying and asked him who his father was. It turned out the officer had known Lustig's father.

== Movie career ==
Lustig began his film career in 1955 as an assistant director at Jadran Film, a state-owned Zagreb-based film production company. In 1956 he worked as a unit production manager on Branko Bauer's World War II drama Ne okreći se sine, winner of three Golden Arena awards at the 1956 Pula Film Festival. Lustig was the location manager for Fiddler on the Roof (1971). In the 1980s Lustig worked on the miniseries The Winds of War (1983) and its sequel War and Remembrance (1988). He moved to the United States in 1988.

Lustig received his first Oscar in 1993 for the production of Schindler's List, a film based on the novel of Thomas Keneally (which is, in turn, based on the true-life story of a German manufacturer who saved hundreds of Jews during World War II). Lustig himself had a cameo early in the film as a nightclub maitre d’. In July 2015, Lustig presented the Oscar to Yad Vashem for eternal safekeeping. He received his second Oscar for the epic movie Gladiator about a struggle for power in Imperial Rome, in 2001. Other major Hollywood films that Lustig worked on as a producer or executive producer include The Peacemaker (1997), Hannibal (2001), and Black Hawk Down (2001). In 2008, Lustig helped establish an independent production company Six Point Films to produce "meaningful, thought-provoking independent films".

== Personal life and death ==
In 1994 Lustig received the Order of Duke Trpimir by President Franjo Tuđman for his work in film. In 2008 he became the first filmmaker ever, and second in the field of the arts (preceded by Vladimir Nazor), to be awarded an honorary doctorate from the University of Zagreb.

The Los Angeles Museum of the Holocaust honored Branko Lustig together with Andreas Maislinger at his 2nd Annual Dinner on 8 November 2009 at the Beverly Hills Hotel for his long-time commitment to Holocaust education and commemoration. Lustig was the honorary president and one of the founding members of the Jewish Movie Festival in Zagreb. On 16 September 2010, he was awarded honorary citizenship of Osijek.

Lustig celebrated his bar mitzvah on 2 May 2011 at Auschwitz, in front of barrack No. 24a. He missed his rite of passage as a 13-year-old because at the time he was a prisoner in the very same barrack, having been deported from Osijek when he was ten years old. The bar mitzvah ceremony was held during a March of the Living educational tour of Poland and Israel for high school students.

Lustig resided between Los Angeles and Zagreb, and called both of the cities his home, although in the Jutarnji list interview from September, 2012 he stated: "But more and more, slowly, I am returning to Zagreb. I'm coming back." In the 2017 local elections Lustig was elected member of the Zagreb City Assembly as a candidate of Milan Bandić's party list but eventually did not take his seat.

Lustig died in Zagreb on 14 November 2019, aged 87.

Lustig's life was remembered in BBC Radio 4's obituary programme Last Word in December 2019.

== Filmography ==
Year	Title	Role	Notes
1962	Kozara	A German wounded in the eyes	
1975	Anno Domini 1573	Bringer of the execution crown	
1984	Memed, My Hawk	Prison Guard	
1993	Schindler's List	Nightclub Maitre d'	
1997	The Peacemaker	Man with Poodle	(final film role)
