= Center of Jewish Studies Shanghai =

Chinese think tank

The Center for Jewish Studies Shanghai (CJSS, simplified Chinese: 上海犹太研究中心; traditional Chinese: 上海猶太研究中心; pinyin: Shànghǎi Yóutài Yánjiūzhōngxīn) was established in 1988. It is a department of the Shanghai Academy of Social Sciences. Under the leadership of Dean Professor Pan Guang CJSS has become the most influential research institute in China studying Judaism and Israeli affairs. The founder, Professor Pan Guang, has published a systematic study of the Jewish refugees' experience in China during World War II, that marked the conclusion of a project sponsored by the National Science Fund of China.

== Overview ==
The Center focuses its research on the history of the "Shanghai Jews" (the Holocaust refugees during World War II), the remnants of Jewish communities in China (the largest of which are in Tianjin, Harbin and Kaifeng) and political studies on the Near East. About 30,000 Jewish refugees came to China between 1933 and 1941. Most of them landed in Shanghai, an open city that didn't require a visa to enter. This is described in the book "Jewish Refugees in China (1933-1945)" published by the Dean of CJSS, Professor Pan, after 7 years of research with dozen of colleagues.

Amongst the publications of the Center are The Jews of China, The Jewish Civilization, The Revitalization of the Jewish People and Jews in China: Legends, History and New Perspectives.

The Center has organized several national as well as international academic conferences along with so-called Rickshaw Reunions (reunions of Holocaust refugees who survived the Holocaust in Shanghai). The Center has been visited by prominent guests, amongst them Yitzhak Rabin, Ehud Olmert, Gerhard Schröder, Ariel Sharon, Hillary Clinton and then Austrian President Thomas Klestil.

The institution receives international support. It is a partner of the Austrian Holocaust Memorial Service (gedenkdienst). Professor Pan Guang also created within the Center the Walter and Seena Fair Chair for Jewish Studies, endowed by an American benefactor.

== See also ==
- Prof. Pan Guang
- Diane and Guilford Glazer Institute of Jewish Studies
- Shanghai Jewish Refugees Museum
- Shanghai Ghetto
