= Erika Rosenberg =

Argentine writer and journalist (born 1951)

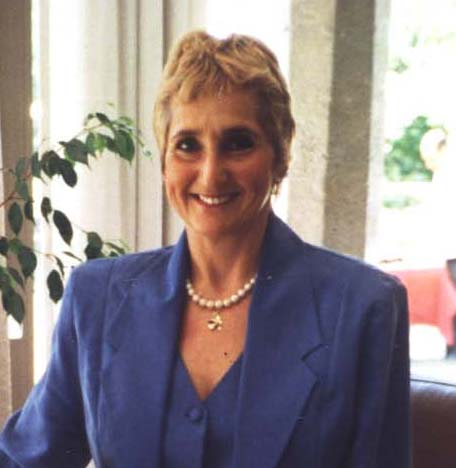
Rosenberg (2000)

Erika Rosenberg (born 24 June 1951) is an Argentine author, interpreter and journalist. She wrote a biography of Emilie Schindler.

== Life ==
Rosenberg was born in a family of German Jews in Buenos Aires, Argentina. Her parents, a lawyer and a doctor, fled Germany in 1936 via Paraguay to Argentina and escaped the Holocaust.

In 1990 she met Emilie Schindler for the first time. Their intensive conversations are documented in more than 70 hours of recordings from which Rosenberg made the biography "In Schindlers Schatten" in 1997. After Emilie Schindler's death on October 9, 2001, Erika Rosenberg was appointed one of her heirs, as their common work also led to a great friendship.

Since 2009 Rosenberg has represented Argentina at the International Council of the Austrian Service Abroad. Erika Rosenberg was 2015 honored with the Bundesverdienstkreuz am Bande of the Federal Republic of Germany. She published a new book with the biography of Pope Francis, and 2016 a biography of Carl Lutz, who saved the life of more 60,000 Jews from deportation in Hungary. Erika Rosenberg was the key note speaker at the International Congress of Education in Tullahoma, Tennessee in 2017.

== Written works ==
- Where Light and Shadow Meet: A Memoir, W. W. Norton & Company (1997). ISBN 978-0-393-33617-7
- In Schindlers Schatten. Emilie Schindler erzählt ihre Geschichte, Kiepenheuer & Witsch (1997). ISBN 3-462-02585-6
- Ich, Oskar Schindler: Die persönlichen Aufzeichnungen, Briefe und Dokumente, Herbig Verlag, Munich 2001 ISBN 3-7766-2204-0
- Ich, Emilie Schindler. Erinnerungen einer Unbeugsamen, Herbig Verlag, Munich (2001). ISBN 3-7766-2230-X
- Oskar Schindler. Seine unbekannten Helfer und Gegner Lit-Verlag (2012). ISBN 978-3-643-11884-4
- " Als ich mit dem Papst U-Bahn fuhr", When I was with the Pope in the tube, Langen Müller Herbig, München 2015
- "Das Glashaus. Carl Lutz und die Rettung ungarischer Juden vor dem Holocaust", Langen Müller Herbig, München 2016
