= List of North European Jews =

Before the Holocaust, Jews were a significant part of the population in Lithuania where they numbered around 240,000, including approximately 100,000 in Vilnius, or about 45% of that city's pre-World War II population (Vilnius was also once known as the "Jerusalem of Lithuania"). A large Jewish community also existed in Latvia. In comparison, Estonia and the Nordic countries have had much smaller communities, concentrated mostly in Denmark and Sweden. The following is a list of prominent North European Jews, arranged by country of origin:

== Denmark ==
- Mogens Ballin, painter
- Victor Bendix, composer, conductor and pianist
- Susanne Bier, film director
- Kim Bodnia, actor
- Harald Bohr, mathematician and footballer (Jewish mother)
- Niels Bohr, physicist, Nobel Prize (1922) (Jewish mother)
- Victor Borge, entertainer
- Edvard Brandes, politician, critic and author, minister of finance from 1909 to 1910
- Ernst Brandes, economist and editor
- Georg Brandes, author and critic, father of Danish naturalism
- Marcus Choleva, chief executive officer of KFI
- Dagmar Cohn, illustrator
- Esther Gehlin, painter
- Meïr Aron Goldschmidt, author and editor
- Heinrich Hirschsprung, industrialist, art patron (Den Hirschsprungske Samling)
- Arne Jacobsen, architect and designer (Jewish mother)
- Abraham Kurland, Olympic wrestling medalist
- Arne Melchior, politician and former Transport Minister and Minister for Communication and Tourism
- Marcus Melchior, chief rabbi of Denmark, father of Arne Melchior
- Michael Melchior, rabbi and Israeli politician
- Ivan Osiier, seven-time Olympic fencer
- Lee Oskar, harmonica player, member of War
- Herbert Pundik, journalist
- Raquel Rastenni, jazz and popular singer
- Edgar Rubin, Gestalt psychologist
- Dan Zahavi, philosopher
- Nikolaj Znaider, violinist, conductor

== Estonia ==
- Jüri Alperten (1957–2020), conductor, pianist and music teacher
- Eino Baskin (1929–2015), actor and theatre director
- Avi Benjamin (born 1959), composer
- Ben Berlin (1896–1944), jazz musician
- Maria Dangell (born 1974), singer and pianist
- Aaron Feinstein, chess player
- Moses Wolf Goldberg (1905–1964), chemist
- Heinrich Gutkin (1879–1941), businessman and politician
- Idel Jakobson (1904–1997), NKVD investigator
- Louis Kahn (1901–1974), architect
- Anna Klas (1912–1999), pianist
- Eri Klas (1939–2016), conductor
- Mihhail Lotman (born 1952), philologist and politician
- Juri Lotman (1922–1993), semiotician
- Zara Mints (1927–1990), literary scientist
- Vladimir Padwa (1900–1981), pianist and composer
- Ita Saks (1921–2003), translator and publicist
- Hagi Šein (born 1945), journalist, film director, screenwriter and professor
- Benno Schotz (1891–1984), sculptor
- Samuel H. Shapiro (1907–1987), politician
- Emmanuel Steinschneider (1886–1970), physician
- Leonid Stolovich (1929–2013), philosopher
- David Vseviov (born 1949), historian

== Finland ==
- Mathilda Berwald, singer
- Max Dimont, historian and author
- Ida Ekman, soprano singer
- Abba Gindin, Finnish-born Israeli football player
- Rosalia Gurovich, barber
- Kim Hirschovits, ice hockey player
- Ruben Jaari, businessman
- Max Jakobson, diplomat
- Wolf Karni, football referee
- Daniel Katz, writer
- Elias Katz, athlete, Olympic medalist
- Kalle Katz, footballer
- Salomon Klass (1907–1985), Finnish Army captain
- Yorai Maliach, Israeli footballer of Finnish-descent
- Roni Porokara, footballer
- Boris Rotenberg, football player
- Marion Rung, pop singer
- Elis Sella, actor
- Seela Sella, actress
- Pekka K. Sinervo, Finnish-Canadian physicist
- Mauritz Stiller, director
- Uniikki, rapper
- Sam Vanni, painter
- Poju Zabludowicz, business magnate
- Ben Zyskowicz, conservative leader

== Iceland ==
- Vladimir Ashkenazy (born 1937), pianist (Jewish father)
- Bobby Fischer (1943–2008), chess player (Jewish mother, but did not self-identify as a Jew; American expatriate, Icelandic)
- Dorrit Moussaieff (born 1950), former First Lady of Iceland
- Sruli Recht (born 1979), fashion designer

== Latvia ==
- Elya Baskin, actor
- Isaiah Berlin, historian of ideas
- Lipman Bers, mathematician and activist
- David Bezmozgis, author
- Boris Brutskus
- Sergei Eisenstein, film director
- Movsas Feigins, chess player
- Morris Halle, linguist
- Philippe Halsman, photographer
- Joseph Hirshhorn, financier and philanthropist
- Abraham Zevi Idelsohn, Jewish musicologist
- Hermann Jadlowker, musician (born at Riga)
- Mariss Jansons, conductor (Jewish mother)
- Gil Kane, comic book illustrator
- Alexander Koblencs, chess player
- Abraham Isaac Kook, rabbi
- Gidon Kremer, violinist; father was a Jewish Holocaust survivor
- Nechama Leibowitz
- Yeshayahu Leibowitz
- Hermanis Matisons, chess player
- Mischa Maisky, cellist
- Solomon Mikhoels, actor
- Aron Nimzowitsch, chess player
- Arkady Raikin, performing artist
- Yosef Rosen, der Rogatchover Gaon
- Mark Rothko, painter
- Judith Shklar, political philosopher
- Meir Simcha of Dvinsk, rabbi
- Mikhail Tal, world chess champion
- Max Weinreich, linguist

== Lithuania ==
- Semyon Alapin (1856–1923), chess player
- Mark Antokolsky (1840–1902), sculptor to Tzar Alexander II of Russia
- Moshe Arens (1925–2019), former Minister of Defence and former Minister of Foreign Affairs of Israel
- Aaron Barak (born 1936), President of the Supreme Court of Israel
- Zerach Barnett (1843–1935), one of founders of Mea Shearim (Jerusalem), Petach Tikva and Neve Shalom, Israel
- Saul Bellow (1915–2005), writer and laureate of the Nobel Prize for Literature (1976)
- Eliezer Ben-Yehuda (1858–1922), reviver of Hebrew
- Bernard Berenson (1865–1959), art critic
- Izis Bidermanas (1911–1980), photographer
- Reuben Asher Braudes (1851–1902), Hebrew-language novelist and journalist
- Victor David Brenner (1871–1924), designer of the US penny
- Eli Broad (1933–2021), American philanthropist and investor; founder of KB Home
- Sir Montague Burton (1885–1952), British retailer
- Abraham Cahan (1860–1951), writer and activist
- Leonard Cohen (1934–2016), musician, poet
- David Cronenberg (born 1943), film director
- Eliyahu Eliezer Dessler (1892–1953), rabbi, Talmudic scholar
- Simeon Dimanstein (1886–1938), Soviet Commissar of Nationalities
- Bob Dylan (born 1941), singer-songwriter, artist, writer
- Ilya Ehrenburg (1891–1967), one of the most prolific and well-known writers during the Soviet Union
- Nosson Tzvi Finkel (1849–1927), Orthodox Jewish leader
- Vyacheslav Ganelin (born 1944), jazz musician
- Sara Ginaite (1924–2018), former resistance fighter, now Canadian academic
- Romain Gary (1914–1980), novelist, the Prix Goncourt (twice)
- Morris Ginsberg (1889–1970), sociologist
- Louis Ginzberg (1873–1953), scholar of the Talmud
- Philip Glass (born 1937), classical composer
- Leah Goldberg (1911–1970), poet
- Emma Goldman (1869–1940), political activist
- Nahum Goldmann (1895–1982), world Jewish leader
- Chaim Grade (1910–1982), Yiddish writer
- Iosif Grigulevich (1913–1988), secret agent, historian
- Zvi Griliches (1930–1999), economist
- Shira Gorshman (1906–2001), Zionist pioneer, Yiddish writer
- Aryeh Leib ben Asher Gunzberg (c. 1695–1785), rabbi
- Bernard Lown (1921–2021), scientist, Nobel prize winner
- Aron Gurwitsch (1901–1973), philosopher
- Laurence Harvey (1928–1973), actor
- Jascha Heifetz (1901–1987), widely regarded as one of the greatest violinists of the 20th century
- Sidney Hillman (1887–1946), political activist
- Shemp Howard (1895–1955), comedian and actor
- Moe Howard (1897–1975), comedian and actor
- Curly Howard (1903–1952), comedian and actor
- Jay M. Ipson (born 1935), founder of the Virginia Holocaust Museum
- Leo Jogiches (1867–1919), revolutionary
- Al Jolson (1886–1950), singer, comedian, and actor
- Berek Joselewicz (1764–1809), colonel of the Polish Army
- Joseph Kagan, Baron Kagan (1915–1995), clothes manufacturer
- Yisrael Meir Kagan (1838–1933), rabbi
- Daniel Kahneman (1934–2024), psychologist, Nobel Prize (2002) (Lithuanian parents)
- Mordechai Kaplan (1881–1983), founder of Reconstructionist Judaism
- Shlomo Kleit (1891–1962), political activist
- Aaron Klug (1926–2018), chemist, Nobel Prize (1982)
- Gurwin Kopel (1923–1990), artist
- Lazare Kopelmanas (1907–1980), international law scholar
- Abba Kovner (1918–1987), poet, writer
- Abraham Dob Bär Lebensohn (c. 1789/1794–1878), Hebraist, poet, and educator
- Micah Joseph Lebensohn (1828–1852), poet and translator
- Phoebus Levene (1869–1940), biochemist
- Emmanuel Levinas (1906–1995), philosopher
- Isaac Levitan (1860–1900), landscape painter
- Bernard Lewis (1916–2018), historian
- Morris Lichtenstein 1889–1938), rabbi, founder of the Jewish Science
- Jacques Lipchitz (1891–1973), cubist sculptor
- Jay Lovestone (1897–1990), politician
- Alexander Ziskind Maimon (1809–1887), author and scholar of the Talmud
- Osip Mandelstam (1891–1938), poet and librettist
- Abraham Mapu (1808–1867), Hebrew novelist
- Isser Zalman Meltzer (1870–1953), rabbi
- Harvey Milk (1930–1978), gay-rights activist
- Hermann Minkowski (1864–1909), mathematician
- Oskar Minkowski (1858–1931), physiologist
- Benjamin Netanyahu (born 1949), Prime Minister of Israel
- Mitchell Parish (1900–1993), Lithuanian-born American lyricist
- Abram Rabinovich (1878–1943), chess player
- Bar Refaeli (born 1985), Israeli supermodel, television host, actress, and businesswoman
- Willy Ronis (1910–2009), photographer
- Eduardas Rozentalis (born 1963), chess player
- Yisroel Salanter (1809–1883), rabbi and Talmudist
- Meyer Schapiro (1904–1996), art historian
- Alexander Schneider (1908–1993), violinist and conductor
- Lasar Segall (1891–1957), painter, engraver, and sculptor
- Benjamin Schlesinger (1876–1932), American labor leader and former President of the International Ladies Garment Workers Union
- Ben Shahn (1898–1969), artist
- Esther Shalev-Gerz (born 1948), artist
- Karl Shapiro (1913–2000), poet (Lithuanian parents)
- Sam (1878–1905), Lee (1871–1953), and Jacob Shubert (1879–1963), theatre managers and producers (cf. Shubert Brothers)
- Joe Slovo (1926–1995), ANC activist
- Elijah ben Solomon (1720–1797), rabbi, the Gaon of Vilna
- Maximilian Steinberg (1883–1946), classical composer
- David Suchet (born 1946), English actor
- Helen Suzman (1917–2009), anti-apartheid MP (Lithuanian parents)
- Isakas Vistaneckis (1910–2000), chess player
- Louis Washkansky (1912–1967), recipient of the world's first human heart transplant
- Uriel Weinreich (1926–1967), linguist
- Irv Weinstein (1930–2017), American broadcaster (Lithuanian parents)
- David Wolfsohn (1855–1914), second President of the World Zionist Organization
- Bluma Zeigarnik (1900–1988), psychologist and psychiatrist
- Emanuelis Zingeris (born 1957), politician
- William Zorach (1889–1966), painter, sculptor, printmaker, and writer
- Louis Zukofsky (1904–1978), poet and professor (Lithuanian parents)
- Benjamin Zuskin (1899–1952), actor

== Norway ==
- Bjørn Benkow, journalist, known for faking interviews
- Jo Benkow, President of the Parliament of Norway
- Carl Paul Caspari, professor in theology (Lutheranism)
- Leo Eitinger (born in Slovakia), professor of psychiatry at University of Oslo and Holocaust survivor, known mainly for his work on late-onset psychological trauma amongst Holocaust survivors
- Victor Goldschmidt, professor in mineralogy
- Salo Grenning, pen name Pedro, editorial cartoonists in Verdens Gang
- Berthold Grünfeld, specialist in psychiatry, and professor in social medicine until 1993
- Imre Hercz, physician and public debater
- Bente Kahan, Yiddish singer and actress
- Hermann Kahan, Holocaust survivor, activist
- Morten Levin, professor of organization and work science
- Robert Levin, pianist
- Oskar Mendelsohn, historian, known for his two-volume history of Norwegian Jews
- Charles Philipson, Supreme Court Justice Judge, Chairman of the Petroleum Law Committee, deputy chairman of the Petroleum Council and chairman of the Riksel Committee
- Moritz Rabinowitz, merchant, active in public debate against antisemitism and Nazism before World War II
- Øystein Wingaard Wolf, poet and author

== Sweden ==
- Olof Aschberg, businessman and banker
- Robert Aschberg, journalist, media executive, TV personality
- Amalia Assur, first female dentist in Sweden
- Lovisa Augusti, opera singer
- Jean-Pierre Barda, musician
- Mathilda Berwald, née Cohn, musician
- Sharon Bezaly, flute soloist
- Jonathan Conricus (born 1979), Swedish-Israeli IDF Lieutenant-Colonel (ret), IDF International Spokesperson
- Jerzy Einhorn, pathologist and politician
- Herbert Felix, entrepreneur
- Aron Flam (born 1978), comedian, podcaster, and writer, and actor
- Josef Frank, architect and designer
- Isaac Grünewald, artist
- Lars Gustafsson, writer and scholar
- Johan Harmenberg, épée fencer, Olympic fencing medalist
- Eli Heckscher, economist
- Aaron Isaac, businessman from Swedish Pomerania, pioneer in the history of Sweden's Jewish population
- Erland Josephson, actor and writer
- Ernst Josephson, painter
- Ragnar Josephson, writer and art historian
- Anne Kalmering, singer
- Mirjam Katzin, academic
- Joel Kinnaman, actor
- George Klein, pathologist and writer
- Oskar Klein, physicist
- Oscar Levertin, poet and literary historian
- Jacob Marcus, businessman, pioneer in the history of Sweden's Jewish population
- Rudolf Meidner, economist
- Hanna Pauli, painter
- Dominika Peczynski, musician
- Alexandra Rapaport, actress
- Marcel Riesz, mathematician
- Göran Rosenberg, journalist
- Bo Rothstein, political scientist
- Nelly Sachs, poet, Nobel Prize (1966)
- Jerzy Sarnecki, criminologist
- Harry Schein, writer and culture personality
- Leif Silbersky, lawyer and author
- Sara Sommerfeld, actress
- Ute Steyer, Sweden's first female rabbi
- Mauritz Stiller, director
- Marcus Storch, industrialist
- Anna Warburg (1881–1967), educator
- Peter Weiss, dramatist and writer
