= Ipson =

Ipson is a surname. Notable people with the surname include:

- Brad Ipson (born 1980), Australian cricketer
- Don Ipson, American politician
- Jason Todd Ipson (born 1972), American director, screenwriter, producer
- Jay M. Ipson (born 1935), Litvak-American Holocaust survivor

== See also ==
- Ipsos
