= August 12 =

August 12 this year in various calendars
- Wednesday, 12 August 2026
Akan	Kuruwukuo
Armenian	23 Nawasardi 1476
Aztec	Pānquetzaliztli 14, 7 Ehēcatl
Babylonian	28 Du'uzu, 2337 SE
Balinese pawukon	Menga, Pasah, Menala, Umanis, Paniron, Buda of Tambir, Uma, Dangu, Suka
Bengali	28 Shrabon, BS 1433
Chinese	Yang Earth Horse・Three Stars Mansion; Fire Horse Year, Month 6, Day 30 (Liqiu, 11 days until Chushu)
Common Era	12 August 2026 CE
Coptic	6 Mesori, AM 1742
Egyptian	28 Choiak, 2775 NE
Ethiopian	6 Naḥasē, 2018 Amätä Məhrät
French Republican	Décade III, Quintidi de Thermidor de l'Année 234 de la République
Gregorian	12 August, AD 2026
Hebrew	29 Av, AM 5786
Hindu	Puṣya・Vyatīpāta; Solar: 27 Śrāvaṇa, 1948 SE; Lunisolar: Amāvasyā, Kṛishna pakṣa of Āṣāḍha, 2083 VE; Rāudra・5127 KY・1,872,799
Icelandic	Miðvikudagur, 18 Heyannir 2026
Islamic	27 Safar, AH 1448 (using tabular method)
ISO week date	2026-W33-3
Japanese	30 Minazuki, Reiwa 8 (Risshū, 11 days until Shosho)
Julian	30 July, AD 2026 (AM 7534)
Julian day	2461265
Korean	30 Yangdal, 4359 DE
Maya	13.0.13.15.2; 15 Yaxkin, 7 Ik
Roman	ante diem III Kalendas Augustas, MMDCCLXXIX AUC
Solar Hijri	21 Mordad, SH 1405
Tibetan	30 chu stod, me pho rta 2153 or 1772 or 1000

<<	August					>>
Su	Mo	Tu	We	Th	Fr	Sa
						1
2	3	4	5	6	7	8
9	10	11	12	13	14	15
16	17	18	19	20	21	22
23	24	25	26	27	28	29
30	31
2026

August 12 in recent years
2026 (Wednesday)
2025 (Tuesday)
2024 (Monday)
2023 (Saturday)
2022 (Friday)
2021 (Thursday)
2020 (Wednesday)
2019 (Monday)
2018 (Sunday)
2017 (Saturday)

August 12 is the 224th day of the year (225th in leap years) in the Gregorian calendar; 141 days remain until the end of the year.

== Events ==
=== Pre-1600 ===
- 1099 – First Crusade: Battle of Ascalon: Crusaders under the command of Godfrey of Bouillon defeat Fatimid forces led by Al-Afdal Shahanshah. This is considered the last engagement of the First Crusade.
- 1121 – Battle of Didgori: The Georgian army under King David IV wins a decisive victory over the famous Seljuk commander Ilghazi.
- 1164 – Battle of Harim: Nur ad-Din Zangi defeats the Crusader armies of the County of Tripoli and the Principality of Antioch.
- 1204 – The Republic of Venice acquires the right to Crete from Boniface I of Montferrat.
- 1323 – The Treaty of Nöteborg between Sweden and Novgorod Republic is signed, regulating the border between the two countries for the first time.
- 1376 – Andronikos IV Palaiologos enters Constantinople by force and captures his father, emperor John V Palaiologos, and his younger brothers during the Byzantine civil war of 1373–1379.
- 1492 – Christopher Columbus arrives in the Canary Islands on his first voyage to the New World.
- 1499 – First engagement of the Battle of Zonchio between Venetian and Ottoman fleets.

=== 1601–1900 ===
- 1624 – Charles de La Vieuville is arrested and replaced by Cardinal Richelieu as the French king's chief advisor.
- 1676 – Praying Indian John Alderman shoots and kills Metacomet, the Wampanoag war chief, ending King Philip's War.
- 1687 – Battle of Mohács: Charles of Lorraine defeats the Ottoman Empire.
- 1765 – Treaty of Allahabad is signed. The Treaty marks the political and constitutional involvement and the beginning of Company rule in India.
- 1788 – The Anjala conspiracy is signed.
- 1793 – The Rhône and Loire départments are created when the former département of Rhône-et-Loire is split into two.
- 1806 – Santiago de Liniers, 1st Count of Buenos Aires re-takes the city of Buenos Aires, Argentina after the first British invasion.
- 1831 – French intervention forces William I of the Netherlands to abandon his attempt to suppress the Belgian Revolution.
- 1851 – Isaac Singer is granted a patent for his sewing machine.
- 1865 – Joseph Lister, British surgeon and scientist, performs the first antiseptic surgery.
- 1883 – The last quagga dies at the Natura Artis Magistra, a zoo in Amsterdam, Netherlands.
- 1898 – The Hawaiian flag is lowered from ʻIolani Palace in an elaborate annexation ceremony and replaced with the flag of the United States to signify the transfer of sovereignty from the Republic of Hawaii to the United States where it is formally recognized as Hawaii.

=== 1901–present ===
- 1914 – World War I: France, the United Kingdom and the British Empire declare war on Austria-Hungary.
- 1914 – World War I: The Battle of Halen a.k.a. Battle of the Silver Helmets, a clash between large Belgian and German cavalry formations at Halen, Belgium.
- 1944 – World War II: Waffen-SS troops massacre 560 people in Sant'Anna di Stazzema.
- 1944 – World War II: Nazi German troops end the week-long Wola massacre, during which at least 40,000 people are killed indiscriminately or in mass executions.
- 1944 – World War II: Alençon is liberated by General Philippe Leclerc de Hauteclocque, becoming the first city in France to be liberated from the Nazis by French forces.
- 1948 – Between 15 and 150 unarmed members of the Khudai Khidmatgar movement are killed by Pakistani police.
- 1950 – Korean War: Bloody Gulch massacre: Seventy-five American POWs are massacred by the North Korean Army.
- 1952 – The Night of the Murdered Poets: Thirteen prominent Jewish intellectuals are murdered in Moscow, Russia, Soviet Union.
- 1953 – Thermonuclear bomb testing: The Soviet atomic bomb project continues with the detonation of "RDS-6s" (Joe 4) using a "layered" scheme.
- 1953 – The 7.2 M_{s} Ionian earthquake shakes the southern Ionian Islands with a maximum Mercalli intensity of X (Extreme). Between 445 and 800 people are killed.
- 1960 – Echo 1A, NASA's first successful communications satellite, is launched.
- 1964 – South Africa is banned from the Olympic Games due to the country's racist policies.
- 1969 – Violence erupts after the Apprentice Boys of Derry march in Derry, Northern Ireland, resulting in a three-day communal riot known as the Battle of the Bogside.
- 1976 – Between 1,000 and 3,500 Palestinians are killed in the Tel al-Zaatar massacre, one of the bloodiest events of the Lebanese Civil War.
- 1977 – The first free flight of the Space Shuttle Enterprise.
- 1977 – The Sri Lanka Riots, targeting the minority Sri Lankan Tamils, begin, less than a month after the United National Party came to power. Over 300 Tamils are killed.
- 1981 – The IBM Personal Computer is released.
- 1984 – An infamous brawl takes place at the Atlanta-Fulton County Stadium between the Atlanta Braves and San Diego Padres.
- 1985 – Japan Air Lines Flight 123, a Boeing 747, crashes into Osutaka ridge in Gunma Prefecture, Japan, killing 520, becoming the worst single-plane air disaster.
- 1990 – Sue, the largest and most complete Tyrannosaurus rex skeleton found to date, is discovered by Sue Hendrickson in South Dakota.
- 1992 – Canada, Mexico and the United States announce completion of negotiations for the North American Free Trade Agreement (NAFTA).
- 1994 – Major League Baseball players go on strike, eventually forcing the cancellation of the 1994 World Series.
- 2000 – The Russian Navy submarine Kursk explodes and sinks in the Barents Sea during a military exercise, killing her entire 118-man crew.
- 2015 – At least two massive explosions kill 173 people and injure nearly 800 more in Tianjin, China.
- 2016 – Syrian civil war: The Syrian Democratic Forces (SDF) capture the city of Manbij from the Islamic State of Iraq and the Levant (ISIL).
- 2017 – The Unite the Right rally occurs in Charlottesville, Virginia, leading to three deaths and injuring nearly 50 more.
- 2018 – Thirty-nine civilians, including a dozen children, are killed in an explosion at a weapons depot in Sarmada, Syria.
- 2021 – Six people, five victims and the perpetrator are killed in Keyham, Plymouth in the worst mass shooting in the UK since 2010.

== Births ==
=== Pre-1600 ===
- 1452 – Abraham Zacuto, Jewish astronomer, astrologer, mathematician, rabbi and historian (died 1515)
- 1503 – Christian III of Denmark (died 1559)
- 1506 – Franciscus Sonnius, Dutch counter-Reformation theologian (died 1576)
- 1591 – Louise de Marillac, co-founder of the Daughters of Charity (died 1660)
- 1599 – Sir William Curtius FRS, German magistrate, English baronet (died 1678)

=== 1601–1900 ===
- 1604 – Tokugawa Iemitsu, Japanese shōgun (died 1651)
- 1626 – Giovanni Legrenzi, Italian composer (died 1690)
- 1629 – Archduchess Isabella Clara of Austria, Austrian archduchess (died 1685)
- 1644 – Heinrich Ignaz Franz Biber, Bohemian-Austrian violinist and composer (died 1704)
- 1686 – John Balguy, English philosopher and author (died 1748)
- 1696 – Maurice Greene, English organist and composer (died 1755)
- 1762 – George IV, King of the United Kingdom (died 1830)
- 1773 – Karl Faber, Prussian historian and academic (died 1853)
- 1774 – Robert Southey, English poet and author (died 1843)
- 1801 – John Cadbury, British Quaker and businessman who founded the Cadbury chocolate company (died 1889)
- 1831 – Helena Blavatsky, Russian theosophist and scholar (died 1891)
- 1833 – William P. Sanders, American army officer (died 1863)
- 1852 – Michael J. McGivney, American priest and founder of the Knights of Columbus (died 1890)
- 1856 – Diamond Jim Brady, American businessman and philanthropist (died 1917)
- 1857 – Ernestine von Kirchsberg, Austrian painter and educator (died 1924)
- 1859 – Katharine Lee Bates, American poet and author (died 1929)
- 1860 – Klara Hitler, Austrian mother of Adolf Hitler (died 1907)
- 1866 – Jacinto Benavente, Spanish playwright, Nobel Prize laureate (died 1954)
- 1866 – Henrik Sillem, Dutch target shooter, mountaineer, and jurist (died 1907)
- 1867 – Edith Hamilton, German-American author and educator (died 1963)
- 1870 – Henry Reuterdahl, Swedish-American artist (died 1925)
- 1871 – Gustavs Zemgals, Latvian politician, 2nd President of Latvia (died 1939)
- 1876 – Mary Roberts Rinehart, American author and playwright (died 1958)
- 1877 – Albert Bartha, Hungarian general and politician, Hungarian Minister of Defence (died 1960)
- 1880 – Radclyffe Hall, English poet, author, and activist (died 1943)
- 1880 – Christy Mathewson, American baseball player and manager (died 1925)
- 1881 – Cecil B. DeMille, American director and producer (died 1959)
- 1883 – Martha Hedman, Swedish-American actress and playwright (died 1974)
- 1883 – Marion Lorne, American actress (died 1968)
- 1885 – Jean Cabannes, French physicist and academic (died 1959)
- 1885 – Keith Murdoch, Australian journalist (died 1952)
- 1885 – Juhan Simm, Estonian composer and conductor (died 1959)
- 1887 – Erwin Schrödinger, Austrian physicist and academic, Nobel Prize laureate (died 1961)
- 1889 – Zerna Sharp, American author and educator (died 1981)
- 1891 – C. E. M. Joad, English philosopher and academic (died 1953)
- 1891 – John McDermott, American golfer (died 1971)
- 1892 – Alfred Lunt, American actor and director (died 1977)
- 1897 – Maurice Fernandes, Guyanese cricketer (died 1981)
- 1897 – Otto Struve, Russian-American astronomer (discoveries in stellar spectroscopy at Yerkes observatory) (died 1963)
- 1899 – Ben Sealey, Trinidadian cricketer (died 1963)

=== 1901–present ===
- 1902 – Mohammad Hatta, Indonesian statesman, 1st Vice President of Indonesia (died 1980)
- 1904 – Idel Jakobson, Latvian-Estonian NKVD officer (died 1997)
- 1904 – Tamás Lossonczy, Hungarian painter (died 2009)
- 1904 – Alexei Nikolaevich, Tsarevich of Russia (died 1918)
- 1906 – Harry Hopman, Australian tennis player and coach (died 1985)
- 1906 – Tedd Pierce, American animator, producer, and screenwriter (died 1972)
- 1907 – Gladys Bentley, American blues singer (died 1960)
- 1907 – Joe Besser, American actor (died 1988)
- 1907 – Boy Charlton, Australian swimmer (died 1975)
- 1907 – Benjamin Sheares, Singaporean physician and politician, 2nd President of Singapore (died 1981)
- 1909 – Bruce Matthews, Canadian general and businessman (died 1991)
- 1910 – Yusof bin Ishak, Singaporean journalist and politician, 1st President of Singapore (died 1970)
- 1910 – Jane Wyatt, American actress (died 2006)
- 1911 – Cantinflas, Mexican actor, screenwriter, and producer (died 1993)
- 1912 – Samuel Fuller, American actor, director, and screenwriter (died 1997)
- 1913 – Richard L. Bare, American director, producer, and screenwriter (died 2015)
- 1914 – Gerd Buchdahl, German-English philosopher and author (died 2001)
- 1914 – Ruth Lowe, Canadian pianist and songwriter (died 1981)
- 1915 – Michael Kidd, American dancer and choreographer (died 2007)
- 1916 – Ioan Dicezare, Romanian general and pilot (died 2012)
- 1916 – Edward Pinkowski, American writer, journalist and Polonia historian (died 2020)
- 1917 – Oliver Crawford, American screenwriter and author (died 2008)
- 1917 – Ebba Haslund, Norwegian writer (died 2009)
- 1918 – Sid Bernstein, American record producer (died 2013)
- 1918 – Guy Gibson, Anglo-Indian commander and pilot, Victoria Cross recipient (died 1944)
- 1919 – Margaret Burbidge, English-American astrophysicist and academic (died 2020)
- 1919 – Vikram Sarabhai, Indian physicist and academic (died 1971)
- 1920 – Charles Gibson, American ethnohistorian (died 1985)
- 1920 – Percy Mayfield, American R&B singer-songwriter (died 1984)
- 1922 – Fulton Mackay, Scottish actor and playwright (died 1987)
- 1922 – Miloš Jakeš, Czech communist politician (died 2020)
- 1923 – John Holt, Jamaican cricketer (died 1997)
- 1924 – Derek Shackleton, English cricketer, coach, and umpire (died 2007)
- 1924 – Muhammad Zia-ul-Haq, Pakistani general and politician, 6th President of Pakistan (died 1988)
- 1925 – Dale Bumpers, American soldier, lawyer, and politician, 38th Governor of Arkansas (died 2016)
- 1925 – Guillermo Cano Isaza, Colombian journalist (died 1986)
- 1925 – Donald Justice, American poet and writing teacher (died 2004)
- 1925 – Norris McWhirter, Scottish publisher and activist co-founded the Guinness World Records (died 2004)
- 1925 – Ross McWhirter, Scottish publisher and activist, co-founded the Guinness World Records (died 1975)
- 1925 – George Wetherill, American physicist and academic (died 2006)
- 1926 – Douglas Croft, American child actor (died 1963)
- 1926 – John Derek, American actor, director, and cinematographer (died 1998)
- 1926 – Joe Jones, American R&B singer-songwriter and producer (died 2005)
- 1927 – Porter Wagoner, American singer-songwriter and guitarist (died 2007)
- 1928 – Charles Blackman, Australian painter and illustrator (died 2018)
- 1928 – Bob Buhl, American baseball player (died 2001)
- 1928 – Dan Curtis, American director and producer (died 2006)
- 1929 – Buck Owens, American singer-songwriter and guitarist (died 2006)
- 1930 – Harry Babcock, American football player and first overall draft pick (died 1996)
- 1930 – George Soros, Hungarian-American businessman and investor, founded the Soros Fund Management
- 1930 – Kanagaratnam Sriskandan, Sri Lankan engineer and civil servant (died 2010)
- 1930 – Jacques Tits, Belgian-French mathematician and academic (died 2021)
- 1931 – William Goldman, American author, playwright, and screenwriter (died 2018)
- 1932 – Dallin H. Oaks, American lawyer, jurist, and religious leader
- 1932 – Charlie O'Donnell, American radio and television announcer (died 2010)
- 1932 – Sirikit, Queen mother of Thailand (died 2025)
- 1933 – Parnelli Jones, American race car driver and businessman (died 2024)
- 1933 – Frederic Lindsay, Scottish author and educator (died 2013)
- 1934 – Robin Nicholson, English metallurgist and academic (died 2024)
- 1935 – John Cazale, American actor (died 1978)
- 1936 – Kjell Grede, Swedish director and screenwriter (died 2017)
- 1936 – John Poindexter, American naval officer, and National Security Advisor under Ronald Reagan
- 1937 – Walter Dean Myers, American author and poet (died 2014)
- 1938 – Jean-Paul L'Allier, Canadian journalist and politician, 38th Mayor of Quebec City (died 2016)
- 1939 – George Hamilton, American actor
- 1939 – David Jacobs, American television writer and producer (died 2023)
- 1939 – S. Jayakumar, Singaporean politician, 4th Senior Minister of Singapore
- 1939 – Pam Kilborn, Australian track and field athlete
- 1939 – David King, South African chemist and academic
- 1939 – Sushil Koirala, Nepalese politician, 37th Prime Minister of Nepal (died 2016)
- 1939 – Roy Romanow, Canadian lawyer and politician, 12th Premier of Saskatchewan
- 1940 – Eddie Barlow, South African cricketer and coach (died 2005)
- 1940 – John Waller, English historical European martial arts (HEMA) revival pioneer and fight director (died 2018)
- 1941 – Réjean Ducharme, Canadian author and playwright (died 2017)
- 1941 – Edwin Feulner, American political scientist (died 2025)
- 1941 – Dana Ivey, American actress
- 1942 – Hans-Wilhelm Müller-Wohlfahrt, German physician and author
- 1943 – Javeed Alam, Indian academician (died 2016)
- 1945 – Dorothy E. Denning, American computer scientist and academic
- 1945 – Ron Mael, American keyboard player and songwriter
- 1947 – John Nathan-Turner, English author and television director, producer, and writer (died 2002)
- 1948 – Siddaramaiah, Indian lawyer and politician, 22nd Chief Minister of Karnataka
- 1948 – Graham J. Zellick, English academic and jurist
- 1949 – Panagiotis Chinofotis, Greek admiral and politician
- 1949 – Mark Knopfler, Scottish-English singer-songwriter, guitarist, and producer
- 1949 – Lou Martin, Northern Irish pianist, songwriter, and producer (died 2012)
- 1949 – Alex Naumik, Lithuanian-Norwegian singer-songwriter and producer (died 2013)
- 1949 – Rick Ridgeway, American mountaineer and photographer
- 1950 – Jim Beaver, American actor, director, and screenwriter
- 1950 – August "Kid Creole" Darnell, American musician, bandleader, singer-songwriter, and record producer
- 1950 – Jamie Dunn, Australian actor, radio and television host (died 2026)
- 1950 – George McGinnis, American basketball player (died 2023)
- 1951 – Klaus Toppmöller, German football manager and former player
- 1952 – Daniel Biles, American associate justice of the Kansas Supreme Court
- 1952 – Sitaram Yechury, Indian politician and leader of CPI(M) (died 2024)
- 1953 – Peter Ostroushko, American fiddler, mandolin player, and composer (A Prairie Home Companion) (died 2021)
- 1954 – Rob Borbidge, Australian politician, 35th Premier of Queensland
- 1954 – Leung Chun-ying, Hong Kong businessman and politician, 3rd Chief Executive of Hong Kong
- 1954 – Ibolya Dávid, Hungarian lawyer and politician, Minister of Justice of Hungary
- 1954 – François Hollande, French lawyer and politician, 24th President of France
- 1954 – Sam J. Jones, American actor
- 1954 – Pat Metheny, American jazz guitarist and composer
- 1956 – Bruce Greenwood, Canadian actor and producer
- 1956 – Sidath Wettimuny, Sri Lankan cricketer
- 1957 – Friedhelm Schütte, German footballer
- 1958 – Jürgen Dehmel, German bass player and songwriter
- 1960 – Laurent Fignon, French cyclist and sportscaster (died 2010)
- 1961 – Mark Priest, New Zealand cricketer
- 1963 – Kōji Kitao, Japanese sumo wrestler, the 60th Yokozuna (died 2019)
- 1963 – Campbell Newman, Australian politician, 38th Premier of Queensland
- 1964 – Txiki Begiristain, Spanish footballer
- 1964 – Michael Hagan, Australian rugby league player and coach
- 1965 – Peter Krause, American actor
- 1966 – Tobias Ellwood, American-English captain and politician
- 1967 – Andy Hui, Hong Kong singer-songwriter and actor
- 1967 – Andrey Plotnikov, Russian race walker
- 1967 – Regilio Tuur, Dutch boxer
- 1968 – Thorsten Boer, German footballer and manager
- 1969 – Tanita Tikaram, British pop/folk singer-songwriter
- 1970 – Aleksandar Đurić, Bosnian footballer
- 1971 – Michael Ian Black, American comedian, actor, director, producer, and screenwriter
- 1971 – Yvette Nicole Brown, American actress, comedian, and talk show host
- 1971 – Rebecca Gayheart, American actress
- 1971 – Pete Sampras, American tennis player
- 1972 – Demir Demirkan, Turkish singer-songwriter and producer
- 1972 – Mark Kinsella, Irish footballer and manager
- 1972 – Takanohana Kōji, Japanese sumo wrestler, the 65th Yokozuna
- 1972 – Gyanendra Pandey, Indian cricketer
- 1972 – Del the Funky Homosapien, American rapper
- 1973 – Jonathan Coachman, American sportscaster and wrestler
- 1973 – Grey DeLisle, American country singer-songwriter, autoharp player, voice actress and comedienne
- 1973 – Mark Iuliano, Italian footballer and manager
- 1975 – Casey Affleck, American actor
- 1976 – Pedro Collins, Barbadian cricketer
- 1976 – Mikko Lindström, Finnish guitarist
- 1976 – Henry Tuilagi, Samoan rugby player
- 1976 – Antoine Walker, American basketball player
- 1977 – Plaxico Burress, American football player
- 1977 – Jesper Grønkjær, Danish footballer
- 1977 – Park Yong-ha, South Korean actor (died 2010)
- 1978 – Chris Chambers, American football player
- 1978 – Hayley Wickenheiser, Canadian ice hockey player
- 1979 – Cindy Klassen, Canadian speed skater
- 1979 – Austra Skujytė, Lithuanian pentathlete
- 1980 – Javier Chevantón, Uruguayan footballer
- 1980 – Maggie Lawson, American actress
- 1980 – Dominique Swain, American actress
- 1980 – Matt Thiessen, Canadian-American singer-songwriter and guitarist
- 1981 – Tony Capaldi, Norwegian–Northern Irish footballer
- 1981 – Djibril Cissé, French footballer
- 1982 – Boban Grnčarov, Macedonian footballer
- 1982 – Alexandros Tzorvas, Greek footballer
- 1983 – Klaas-Jan Huntelaar, Dutch footballer
- 1983 – Kléber Giacomance de Souza Freitas, Brazilian footballer
- 1983 – Manoa Vosawai, Italian rugby player
- 1985 – Danny Graham, English footballer
- 1986 – Andrei Agius, Maltese footballer
- 1986 – Kyle Arrington, American football player
- 1987 – Vanessa Watts, West Indian cricketer
- 1988 – Tyson Fury, English boxer
- 1988 – Matt Gillett, Australian rugby league player
- 1989 – Tom Cleverley, English footballer
- 1989 – Hong Jeong-ho, South Korean footballer
- 1989 – Sunye, South Korean singer
- 1990 – Mario Balotelli, Italian footballer
- 1991 – Jesinta Campbell, Australian model
- 1991 – Sam Hoare, Australian rugby league player
- 1991 – Khris Middleton, American basketball player
- 1991 – LaKeith Stanfield, American actor and musician
- 1992 – Cara Delevingne, English model and actress
- 1992 – Jacob Loko, Australian rugby player
- 1992 – Teo Gheorghiu, Swiss pianist and actor
- 1993 – Ewa Farna, Czech singer-songwriter
- 1993 – Luna, South Korean singer, actress and presenter
- 1994 – Ian Happ, American baseball player
- 1996 – Choi Yu-jin, South Korean singer and actress
- 1996 – Arthur Melo, Brazilian footballer
- 1996 – Samuel Moutoussamy, Congolese footballer
- 1998 – Stefanos Tsitsipas, Greek tennis player
- 1999 – Matthijs de Ligt, Dutch footballer
- 1999 – Dream, American YouTuber
- 1999 – Jule Niemeier, German tennis player
- 1999 – GK Barry, social media star and presenter
- 2000 – Tristan Charpentier, French racing driver
- 2001 – Dixie D'Amelio, American social media personality and singer

== Deaths ==
=== Pre-1600 ===
- 30 BC – Cleopatra, Egyptian queen (born 69 BC)
- 792 – Jænberht, archbishop of Canterbury
- 875 – Louis II, Holy Roman Emperor (born 825)
- 960 – Li Gu, chancellor of Later Zhou (born 903)
- 961 – Yuan Zong, emperor of Southern Tang (born 916)
- 1222 – Vladislaus III, duke of Bohemia
- 1295 – Charles Martel, king of Hungary (born 1271)
- 1319 – Rudolf I, duke of Bavaria (born 1274)
- 1315 – Guy de Beauchamp, 10th Earl of Warwick, English nobleman
- 1335 – Prince Moriyoshi, Japanese shōgun (born 1308)
- 1399 – Demetrius I Starshy, Prince of Trubczewsk (in battle) (born 1327)
- 1424 – Yongle, emperor of the Ming Empire (born 1360)
- 1484 – Sixtus IV, pope of the Catholic Church (born 1414)
- 1546 – Francisco de Vitoria, Spanish theologian (born 1492)
- 1577 – Thomas Smith, English scholar and diplomat (born 1513)
- 1588 – Alfonso Ferrabosco the elder, Italian-English composer (born 1543)

=== 1601–1900 ===
- 1602 – Abu'l-Fazl ibn Mubarak, Mughal vizier and historian (born 1551)
- 1612 – Giovanni Gabrieli, Italian organist and composer (born 1557)
- 1638 – Johannes Althusius, German jurist and philosopher (born 1557)
- 1674 – Philippe de Champaigne, Belgian-French painter and educator (born 1602)
- 1689 – Pope Innocent XI (born 1611)
- 1778 – Peregrine Bertie, 3rd Duke of Ancaster and Kesteven, English general and politician, Lord Lieutenant of Lincolnshire (born 1714)
- 1809 – Mikhail Kamensky, Russian field marshal (born 1738)
- 1810 – Étienne Louis Geoffroy, French pharmacist and entomologist (born 1725)
- 1822 – Robert Stewart, Viscount Castlereagh, Irish-English politician, Secretary of State for Foreign Affairs (born 1769)
- 1827 – William Blake, English poet and painter (born 1757)
- 1829 – Charles Sapinaud de La Rairie, French general (born 1760)
- 1848 – George Stephenson, English engineer and academic (born 1781)
- 1849 – Albert Gallatin, Swiss-American ethnologist, linguist, and politician, 4th United States Secretary of the Treasury (born 1761)
- 1861 – Eliphalet Remington, American inventor and businessman, founded Remington Arms (born 1793)
- 1864 – Sakuma Shōzan, Japanese scholar and politician (born 1811)
- 1865 – William Jackson Hooker, English botanist and academic (born 1785)
- 1891 – James Russell Lowell, American poet and critic (born 1819)
- 1896 – Thomas Chamberlain, American colonel (born 1841)
- 1900 – Wilhelm Steinitz, Austrian chess player and theoretician (born 1836)

=== 1901–present ===
- 1901 – Adolf Erik Nordenskiöld, Finnish-Swedish botanist, geologist, mineralogist, and explorer (born 1832)
- 1904 – William Renshaw, English tennis player (born 1861)
- 1914 – John Philip Holland, Irish engineer, designed HMS Holland 1 (born 1840)
- 1918 – William Thompson, American archer (born 1848)
- 1921 – Pyotr Boborykin, Russian playwright and journalist (born 1836)
- 1922 – Arthur Griffith, Irish journalist and politician, 3rd President of Dáil Éireann (born 1871)
- 1924 – Sándor Bródy, Hungarian journalist and author (born 1863)
- 1928 – Leoš Janáček, Czech composer and educator (born 1854)
- 1934 – Hendrik Petrus Berlage, Dutch architect, designed the Beurs van Berlage (born 1856)
- 1935 – Friedrich Schottky, German mathematician and academic (born 1851)
- 1940 – Nikolai Triik, Estonian painter, illustrator, and academic (born 1884)
- 1941 – Freeman Freeman-Thomas, 1st Marquess of Willingdon, English soldier and politician, 56th Governor General of Canada (born 1866)
- 1941 – Bobby Peel, English cricketer and umpire (born 1857)
- 1943 – Vittorio Sella, Italian photographer and mountaineer (born 1859)
- 1944 – Joseph P. Kennedy Jr., American lieutenant and pilot (born 1915)
- 1944 – Jacques Pellegrin, French zoologist (born 1873)
- 1952 – David Bergelson, Ukrainian author and playwright (born 1884)
- 1955 – Thomas Mann, German author and critic, Nobel Prize laureate (born 1875)
- 1955 – James B. Sumner, American chemist and academic, Nobel Prize laureate (born 1887)
- 1959 – Mike O'Neill, Irish-American baseball player and manager (born 1877)
- 1964 – Ian Fleming, English spy, journalist, and author (born 1908)
- 1966 – Artur Alliksaar, Estonian poet and author (born 1923)
- 1967 – Esther Forbes, American historian and author (born 1891)
- 1973 – Walter Rudolf Hess, Swiss physiologist and academic, Nobel Prize laureate (born 1881)
- 1973 – Karl Ziegler, German chemist and engineer, Nobel Prize laureate (born 1898)
- 1976 – Tom Driberg, British politician/journalist (born 1905)
- 1978 – John Williams, English motorcycle racer (born 1946)
- 1979 – Ernst Boris Chain, German-Irish biochemist and academic, Nobel Prize laureate (born 1906)
- 1982 – Henry Fonda, American actor (born 1905)
- 1982 – Salvador Sánchez, Mexican boxer (born 1959)
- 1983 – Theodor Burchardi, German admiral (born 1892)
- 1984 – Ladi Kwali, Nigerian potter (born 1925)
- 1985 – Kyu Sakamoto, Japanese singer-songwriter (born 1941)
- 1985 – Manfred Winkelhock, German race car driver (born 1951)
- 1986 – Evaline Ness, American author and illustrator (born 1911)
- 1988 – Jean-Michel Basquiat, American painter (born 1960)
- 1989 – Aimo Koivunen, Finnish soldier and corporal (born 1917)
- 1989 – William Shockley, American physicist and academic, Nobel Prize laureate (born 1910)
- 1990 – Dorothy Mackaill, English-American actress (born 1903)
- 1992 – John Cage, American composer and theorist (born 1912)
- 1996 – Victor Ambartsumian, Georgian-Armenian astrophysicist and academic (born 1908)
- 1996 – Mark Gruenwald, American author and illustrator (born 1953)
- 1997 – Jack Delano, American photographer and composer (born 1914)
- 1999 – Jean Drapeau, Canadian lawyer and politician, 37th Mayor of Montreal (born 1916)
- 2000 – Gennady Lyachin, Russian captain (born 1955)
- 2000 – Loretta Young, American actress (born 1913)
- 2002 – Enos Slaughter, American baseball player and manager (born 1916)
- 2004 – Godfrey Hounsfield, English biophysicist and engineer, Nobel Prize laureate (born 1919)
- 2005 – John Loder, English sound engineer and producer, founded Southern Studios (born 1946)
- 2006 – Victoria Gray Adams, American civil rights activist (born 1926)
- 2007 – Merv Griffin, American actor, singer, and producer, created Jeopardy! and Wheel of Fortune (born 1925)
- 2007 – Mike Wieringo, American author and illustrator (born 1963)
- 2008 – Christie Allen, English-Australian singer (born 1954)
- 2008 – Helge Hagerup, Norwegian playwright, poet and novelist (born 1933)
- 2009 – Les Paul, American guitarist, songwriter, and inventor (born 1915)
- 2010 – Isaac Bonewits, American Druid, author, and activist; founded Ár nDraíocht Féin (born 1949)
- 2010 – Guido de Marco, Maltese lawyer and politician, 6th President of Malta (born 1931)
- 2010 – Richie Hayward, American drummer and songwriter (born 1946)
- 2010 – André Kim, South Korean fashion designer (born 1935)
- 2011 – Robert Robinson, English journalist and author (born 1927)
- 2012 – Jimmy Carr, American football player and coach (born 1933)
- 2012 – Jerry Grant, American race car driver (born 1935)
- 2012 – Joe Kubert, Polish-American illustrator, founded The Kubert School (born 1926)
- 2012 – Édgar Morales Pérez, Mexican engineer and politician
- 2012 – Alf Morris, English politician and activist (born 1928)
- 2013 – Tereza de Arriaga, Portuguese painter (born 1915)
- 2013 – Hans-Ekkehard Bob, German soldier and pilot (born 1917)
- 2013 – Pauline Maier, American historian and academic (born 1938)
- 2013 – David McLetchie, Scottish lawyer and politician (born 1952)
- 2013 – Vasiliy Mihaylovich Peskov, Russian ecologist and journalist (born 1930)
- 2014 – Lauren Bacall, American model, actress, and singer (born 1924)
- 2014 – Futatsuryū Jun'ichi, Japanese sumo wrestler (born 1950)
- 2014 – Kongō Masahiro, Japanese sumo wrestler (born 1948)
- 2015 – Jaakko Hintikka, Finnish philosopher and academic (born 1929)
- 2015 – Stephen Lewis, English actor and screenwriter (born 1926)
- 2015 – Meshulim Feish Lowy, Hungarian-Canadian rabbi and author (born 1921)
- 2015 – John Scott, English organist and conductor (born 1956)
- 2016 – Juan Pedro de Miguel, Spanish handball player (born 1958)
- 2017 – Bryan Murray, Canadian ice hockey coach (born 1942)
- 2019 – DJ Arafat, Ivorian DJ and singer (born 1986)
- 2020 – Bill Yeoman, American college football player and coach (born 1927)
- 2021 – Una Stubbs, English actress, TV personality, and dancer (born 1937)
- 2024 – Kim Kahana, American actor and stunt performer (born 1929)

== Holidays and observances ==
- Christian feast day:
  - Euplius
  - Eusebius of Milan
  - Herculanus of Brescia
  - Pope Innocent XI
  - Jænberht
  - Jane Frances de Chantal
  - Blessed Karl Leisner
  - Muiredach (or Murtagh)
  - Porcarius II
  - Blessed Victoria Díez Bustos de Molina
  - August 12 (Eastern Orthodox liturgics)
- Glorious Twelfth (United Kingdom)
- HM the Queen Mother's Birthday and National Mother's Day (Thailand)
- International Youth Day (United Nations)
- Russian Air Force Day (Russia)
- Sea Org Day (Scientology)
- World Elephant Day (International)
