= Nancy Wright Beasley =

American novelist

- Born: September 2, 1945 (age 81); Radford, Virginia, U.S.
- Education: Virginia Commonwealth University; Hollins University
- Occupation: Author
- Writing career
- Notable works: Izzy's Fire and The Little Lion
- Website: nancywrightbeasley.com

Nancy Wright Beasley (born September 2, 1945) is a Virginia author who primarily writes about the Holocaust. Her most notable books are Izzy's Fire: Finding Humanity in the Holocaust (2005) and The Little Lion (2016).

== Early life and education ==
Nancy Wright Beasley was born in Radford, Virginia, to Protestant parents, Posie H. Wright and Beulah Mae Sutphin. She grew up in Christiansburg, Virginia, and earned a bachelor's degree from Virginia State University in 1981.

Her professional writing career began in 1979 when she was hired as a state correspondent for The Richmond News Leader in Richmond, Virginia. As a correspondent based in South Hill, Virginia, Beasley covered news and features in Mecklenburg County, Virginia, and was one of the lead reporters covering the largest death row escape in U.S. history, (Mecklenburg Correction Center, Boydton, Virginia, May 31, 1984), which gave Beasley her first copyrighted work. She resigned from the newspaper in 1986 to pursue corporate writing, and relocated to Richmond in 1994. There she became a columnist and contributing editor for Richmond magazine, a position she held from 1998 to 2014.

Having earned a bachelor's degree from Virginia State University in 1981, Beasley pursued higher education, earning a master's degree from the Virginia Commonwealth University's School of Mass Communications in 2000 and a master of fine arts in Children's Literature from Hollins University in 2011.

== Career ==
She published her first book, Izzy's Fire: Finding Humanity in the Holocaust, in 2005 after seven years of research and writing. The story, which tells of how a Catholic farm family saved thirteen Jews from the Holocaust in Lithuania, is recreated at the Virginia Holocaust Museum, in Richmond, Virginia, where the book is sold. A revised edition containing new photographs, and new material, was published in 2015.

She subsequently wrote The Little Lion: A Hero in the Holocaust as her master's thesis at Hollins University. The young adult historical novel, also set in Lithuania in Kovno Ghetto, is based on the life of a teenage Jewish boy and tells how he helped some family members survive and escape the ghetto, where approximately 40,000 people lost their lives, the vast majority of them Jews. The Little Lion was adapted for the stage by Richmond, Va., playwright Irene Ziegler, and was performed at Swift Creek Mill Theatre in South Chesterfield, Virginia, under the direction of Tom Width, from January to March 2016. Mill Mountain Theatre in Roanoke, Virginia, also staged The Little Lion in 2017.

Beasley also wrote a third book, Reflections of a Purple Zebra: Essays of a Different Stripe, a collection of 60 of Beasley's columns originally published in Richmond magazine. The book was published in 2007.

In 2018, Beasley began a new project, Saving Sara, a second play based on The Little Lion that depicts the true story of how Sara Gillman was saved from almost certain death in Kovno Ghetto by her teenage uncle. A trailer promoting Saving Sara debuted in June 2018 in Toronto, Canada, at the Rotary International conference. The 25-minute video of the play, which was co-written by Nancy Wright Beasley and Una Harrison, can be optioned for use by schools and colleges, as a support for Holocaust education. It can also be optioned by Rotary clubs to raise funds for PolioPlus, an international program run by Rotary International to provide free polio inoculations throughout the world. Beasley herself is a polio survivor.

Beasley is frequently invited to make author appearances and presentations on her books at schools, colleges, and universities in Virginia and elsewhere. Her author appearances include an author's panel discussion at the Conference on Baltic & Scandinavian Studies at Yale University in March 2014, and one at Eliezer: The Jewish Society at Yale University, in 2014.

She has also traveled to Lithuania, Israel and Germany to lecture on her book and her research. In September 2010, she toured Israel as the guest of Gad Moshe Shalom, son of Emmanuel Shlom, one of the Holocaust survivors depicted in Izzy's Fire. In 2010 she also toured Lithuania, speaking at the U.S. Embassy library, several schools and colleges, and at the residence of Anne E. Derse, who was then the U.S. Ambassador to Lithuania. In 2014 she was the keynote speaker for a program sponsored by the International Commission for the Evaluation of the Crimes of the Nazi and Soviet Occupation Regimes in Lithuania, which was held in the British Embassy. In 2019, Beasley was again invited to be a guest speaker at the U.S. Embassy in Lithuania, where she presented a PowerPoint program, showcasing photos she has taken in Lithuania, as well as showing Saving Sara to invited students and teachers.

Also in 2019, Beasley established Chutzpah and Courage, a 501(c)(3) organization whose purpose is to help make the world a safer place through education and efforts to discourage bullying, discrimination, and anti-Semitism, using programming built upon the foundation laid out in Beasley's books, plays, and videos.

== Awards ==
- Beasley was cited as one of the Ten Outstanding Women in Central Virginia by the Richmond YWCA in 2006, and the Virginia Press Women Inc named her its Communicator of Achievement the same year.
- In 2006, Izzy's Fire was nominated for a People's Choice Award by the Library of Virginia.
- In 2015, Virginia Commonwealth University named Beasley a Monroe Scholar.
- In 2016, Beasley was named the Rotarian of the Year by Brandermill Rotary.

== Books ==
- Beasley, Nancy Wright (2004). Izzy's Fire: Finding Humanity In The Holocaust. Posie Press. p. 308. ISBN 978-0-9861828-0-8; 978-0-9861828-1-5.
- Beasley, Nancy Wright (2007). Reflections of a Purple Zebra: Essays of a Different Stripe (1st ed. ed.). Richmond, Va.: Tandem. p. 350. ISBN 978-1928662907.
- Beasley, Nancy Wright (2015). The Little Lion: A Hero in the Holocaust. Posie Press. p. 194. ISBN 978-0-9861828-2-2; 978-0-9861828-3-9.

== Plays ==
- Saving Sara
