= Moshe Maimon =

Russian painter

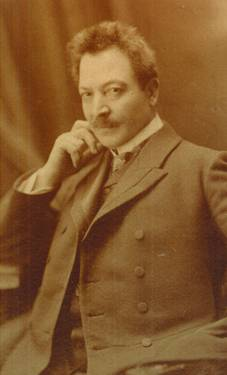
- Born: 1860; Vilkaviškis
- Died: 1924 (aged 63–64); Saint Petersburg
- Education: Member Academy of Arts (1893)
- Alma mater: Imperial Academy of Arts (1887)
- Known for: Painting

Moshe Maimon (also Moses Lvovich Maimon; Russian: Моисей Львович Маймон; 1860–1924) was a Jewish - Russian painter who was born in the Augustów Governorate, then part of the Russian Empire (present-day Lithuania). He was among the first known artists within the Jewish community of Russia. He was also the grandson of the Talmudist Alexander Ziskind Maimon.

== Biography ==
Maimon was born in Vilkaviškis, in the Augustów Governorate of Congress Poland (present-day Lithuania). He was apprenticed as a clockmaker in his youth and studied painting in Vilnius and Warsaw. In 1880 he was admitted to the Imperial Academy of Arts in St. Petersburg. His admission was based on his painting of the Marranos, for which he was awarded with a gold medal. Maimon graduated from the academy in 1883. In later years he was a member of the "Society for the Encouragement of Jewish Arts", which was established in St. Peterburg in 1916.

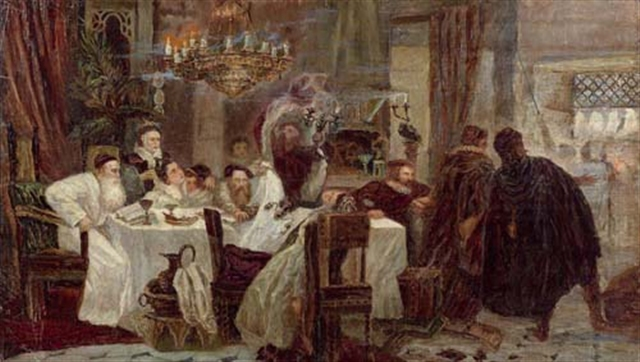
The Marranos (1893)

Apart from Maimon's breakthrough for Jewish artists in his time, his work concerned biblical tales and the history of the Jewish people. Among his familiar works are: "The Marranos", "The Hashmonaim", "The Inquisition" (1893), "Back in the Homeland", "After the Pogrom" (at the Israel Museum Collection, Jerusalem), "The Battle in the Mountains of Turenchin" (1906) and series of paintings devoted to biblical figures. Maimon researched the background of his paintings. In his preparation for "The Marranos" he traveled to Spain to collect details of information to use.

Maimon's painting "The Marranos" was long believed lost by several scholars, including Gabriella Safran, Olga Litvak, and Hillel Kazovsky. But an article by Musya Glants at Harvard tells the exciting and amusing story of the painting's adventures and discovery and eventual "safe harbor". It is now installed at the Hebrew Home for the Aged in New York City.

His work was internationally known at his lifetime. Nine of Maimon's works were shown at the Russian exhibition at the St. Louis World's fair in 1904. Some of his work was shown at the JSEA's exhibition in 1916–1917. He died in 1924 in Leningrad (St. Petersburg).
