= Al Rosenbaum =

American artist (1926–2009)

Al Rosenbaum (1926 – April 11, 2009) was an American artist and the co-founder of the Virginia Holocaust Museum in Richmond, Virginia.

== Personal life ==
Rosenbaum was born in Brooklyn, New York, in 1926. He and his wife, Sylvia Rosenbaum, moved to Richmond, Virginia in 1960. He earned his living from the janitorial business before his retirement in 1989.

== Virginia Holocaust Museum ==
Rosenbaum co-founded the Virginia Holocaust Museum with Jay Ipson and Mark Fetter in 1997. It was originally housed in several rooms at the Temple Beth El on Roseneath Road in Richmond between 1997 and 2003. A new, larger location within a renovated warehouse was dedicated in April 2003.

Rosenbaum created the sculpture of a menorah with six candles that currently stands at the museum. Each of the six candles is intended to represent one million Jews who were murdered during the Holocaust. Rosembaum's menorah sculpture also appears in the Virginia Holocaust Museum's official logo.

== Artist ==
Rosenbaum's initial interest in art glass led him to enroll in courses at Virginia Commonwealth University specifically for glass blowing and casting.

One of his first major sculptures, a 6-foot-tall (1.8 m) piece which he called Shoah, was constructed of wrought iron meant to remind the viewer of concentration camp gates, glass intended to recall Kristallnacht, a rotating "searchlight," rocks and wood. Rosenbaum’s Shoah is now on permanent display at the Virginia Holocaust Museum. In an interview, Rosembaum said that he had seen a wide range of reactions to this specific sculpture, "from the little ones trying to climb inside to the tears of the elderly."

Rosenbaum produced his first one-man art show at the Valentine Museum in 1997. His work had received awards from art shows as far from Virginia as Pennsylvania and Michigan.

=== Death ===
Al Rosenbaum died on April 11, 2009, at the age of 82. He was a resident of Richmond, Virginia, at the time. He was buried in Forest Lawn Cemetery.
