= Jay M. Ipson =

Lithuanian-American Holocaust survivor (born 1935)

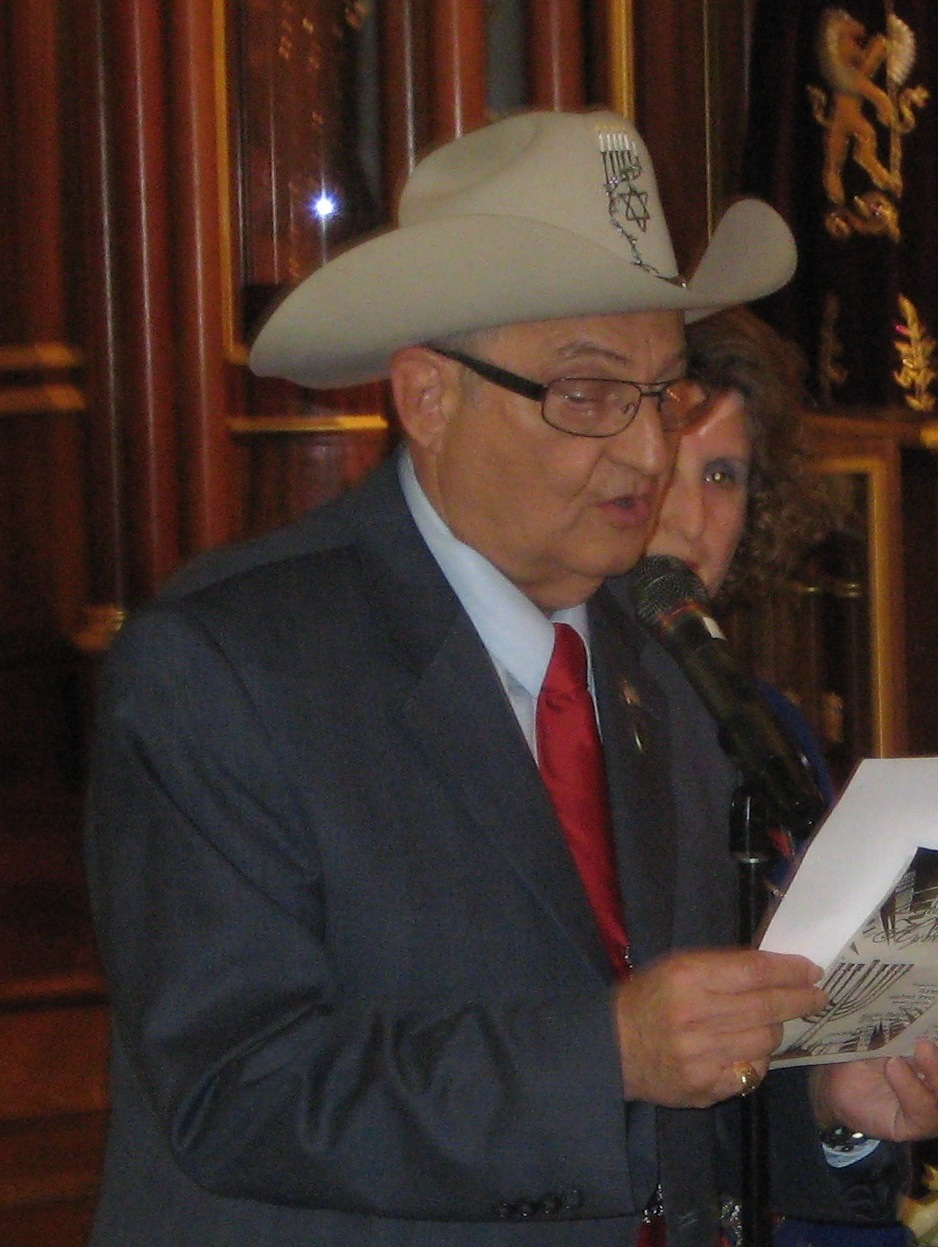
Hanukkah celebration at the Virginia Holocaust Museum (2009)

Jay M. Ipson (born June 5, 1935, in Kovno as Jacob Ipp) is a Litvak-American Holocaust survivor and co-founder of the Virginia Holocaust Museum in Richmond, Virginia.

== Life ==
=== World War II and immigration ===
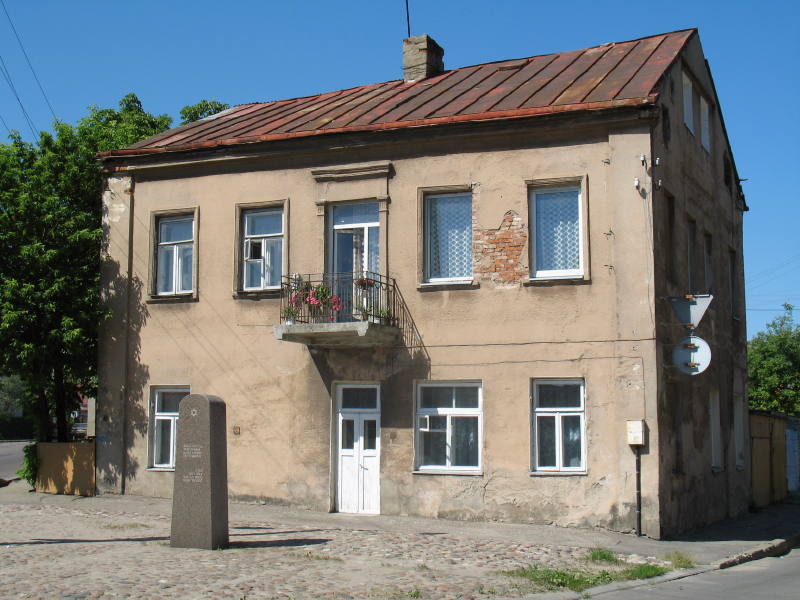
Monument of the Kovno Ghetto

Jacob Ipp was forced into the Kovno Ghetto, established by the occupying forces of Nazi-Germany, with his family at age six. One day, when he and his mother were in line to be deported for execution they were the only two people to survive out of 5,000. After escaping the ghetto with his parents in 1943 before it was turned into a concentration camp, they had to hide for 9 months in the countryside where they spent 6 months underground, hiding in a potato hole. Ipp endured bleak post-war conditions until the family immigrated via Munich to the United States when he was twelve.

=== Studying and working ===
The Ipp family arrived in the United States on June 12, 1947. His father Israel, who had been an attorney in Lithuania, found work cleaning bathrooms in a gas station. His mother Edna worked as a seamstress in Thalhimer's department store. To make their integration into American society easier, they decided to change their family name to Ipson.

Jay M. Ipson graduated from Thomas Jefferson High School and attended the University of Richmond. He joined the United States Army Reserve in 1954, serving as an instructor in the Judge Advocate General's Corps. He was honorably discharged at the rank of sergeant after eight years of service. A skilled aviator, Ipson ascended to the rank of full colonel in the Virginia Defense Force Aviation Brigade, serving as its commander from 1988 to 1992.

As owner of American Auto Parts in Hopewell, Ipson was active in the Anti-Defamation League and frequently spent his mornings giving talks at local schools about the Holocaust. A friend suggested that he should establish a museum to let people learn more from him. After a discussion with leaders at the United States Holocaust Memorial Museum, and with backing from financial and legislative leaders, the Virginia Holocaust Museum was born.

== Virginia Holocaust Museum ==
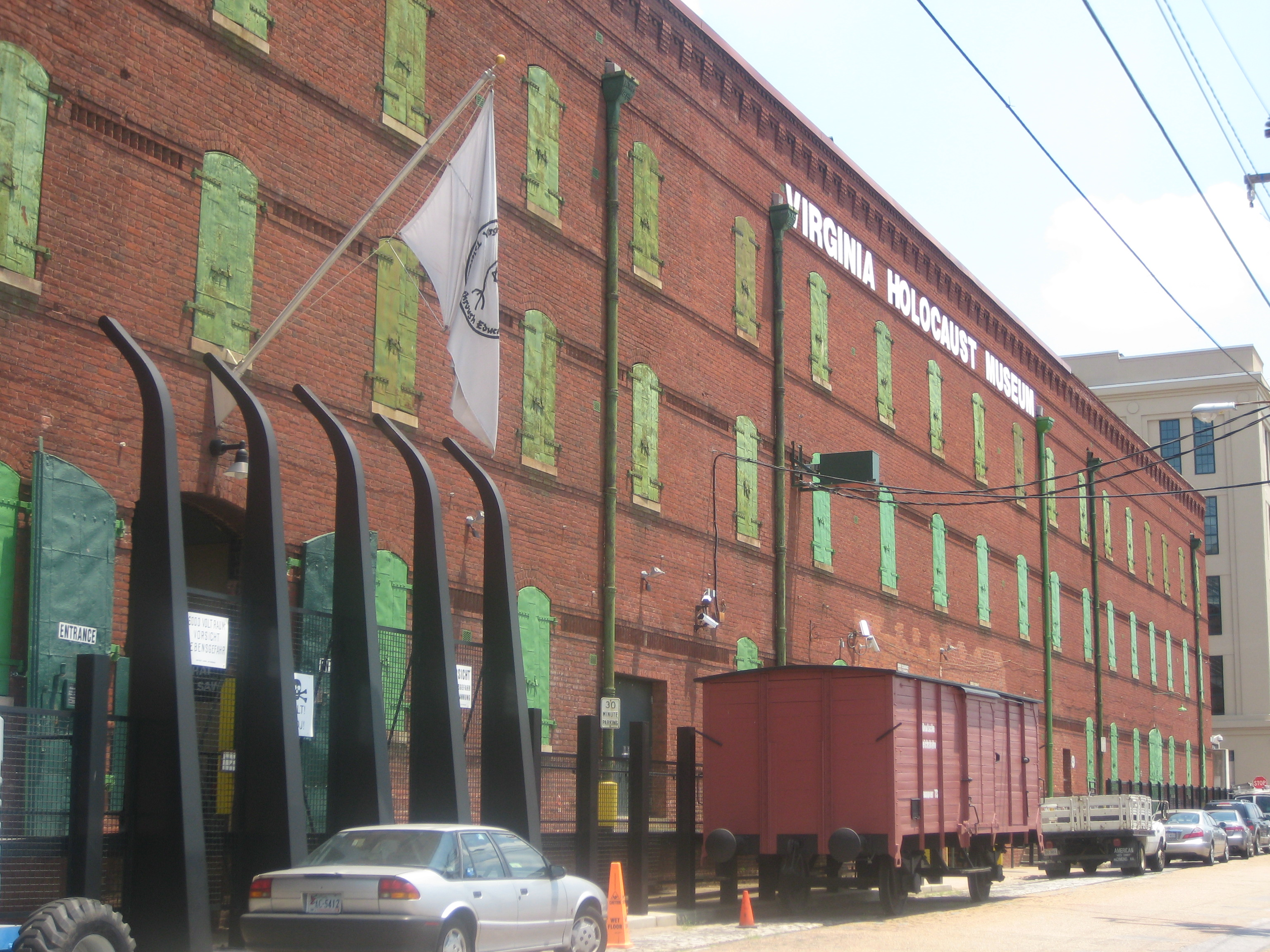
Virginia Holocaust Museum in Richmond

The Virginia Holocaust Museum was established in May 1997 in five small rooms at the old school building next to Temple Beth-el in Richmond. Ipson was mainly supported by Al Rosenbaum and Mark Fetter. Rosenbaum created the sculpture of the menorah used in the museum's logo. Ipson served as the museum's president and executive director until 2012.

But the number of students wanting to attend was rising very fast and so they had to look for a new location. With support of Congressman Eric Cantor the government of Virginia provided an old warehouse at 2000 East Cary Street. After enormous efforts the new museum was opened in 2003.

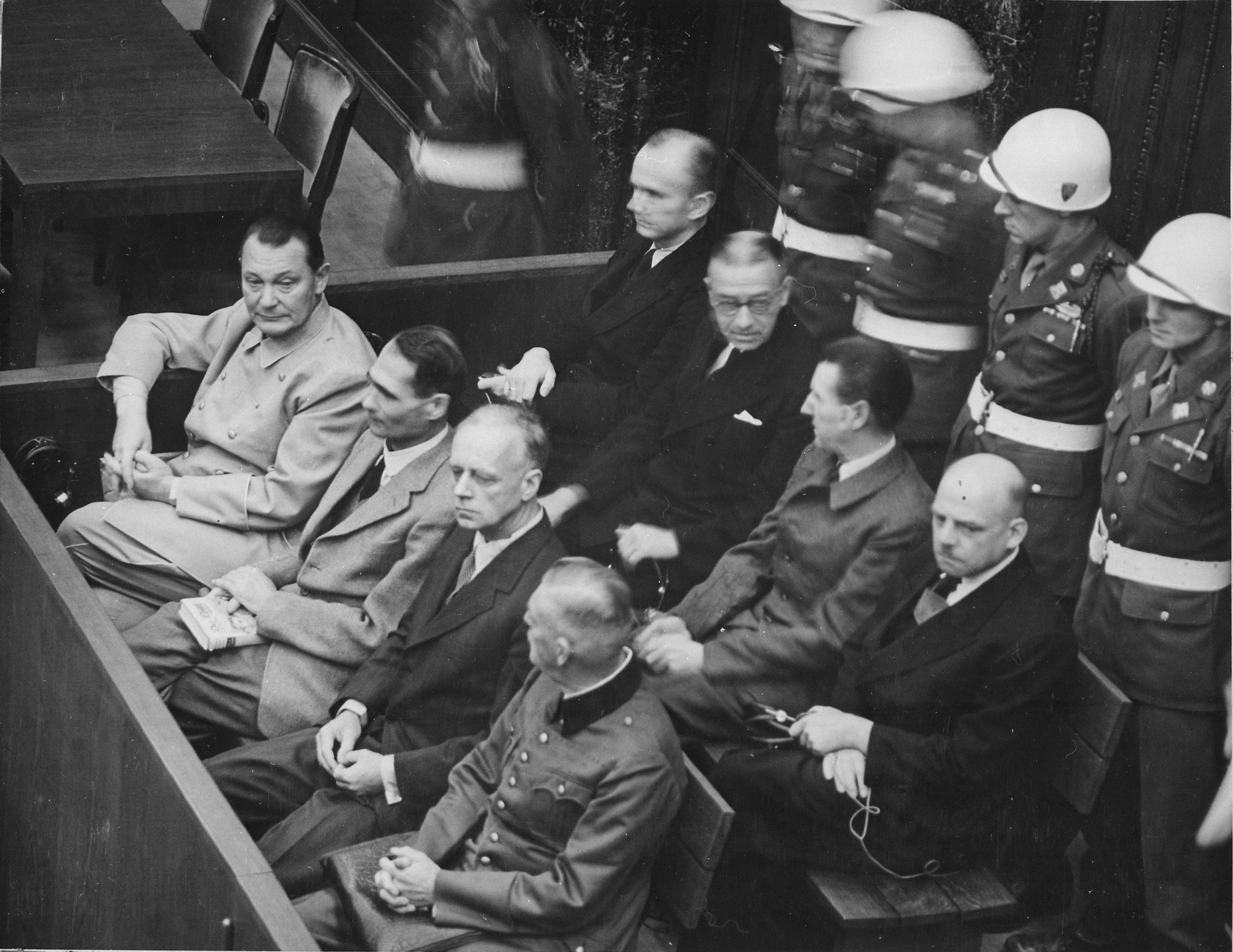
Originally rebuilt Nuremberg Courtroom

The Virginia Holocaust Museum features tours, programs, lectures, films and other events, and many of the emphasized stories are about the experiences of Holocaust survivors who reside or had resided in Richmond. In 2007, the Virginia Holocaust Museum celebrated its 10th anniversary. On Yom HaShoah in April 2008 Governor Tim Kaine opened the only originally rebuilt Nuremberg Courtroom ("Palace of Justice") in the United States as new part of the Virginia Holocaust Museum.

Already more than 150,000 people have visited the Virginia Holocaust Museum; about 70 percent are students. The museum is one of many organizations worldwide where young Austrians can serve their Austrian Holocaust Memorial Service (Gedenkdienst).

== Publications ==
- Izzy's Fire: finding humanity in the Holocaust Nancy Wright Beasley (2005)
- To See, to Feel, to Know: Experiencing the Holocaust Through the Virginia Holocaust Museum, Elisabeth Anne Custalow (2005)

== Awards ==
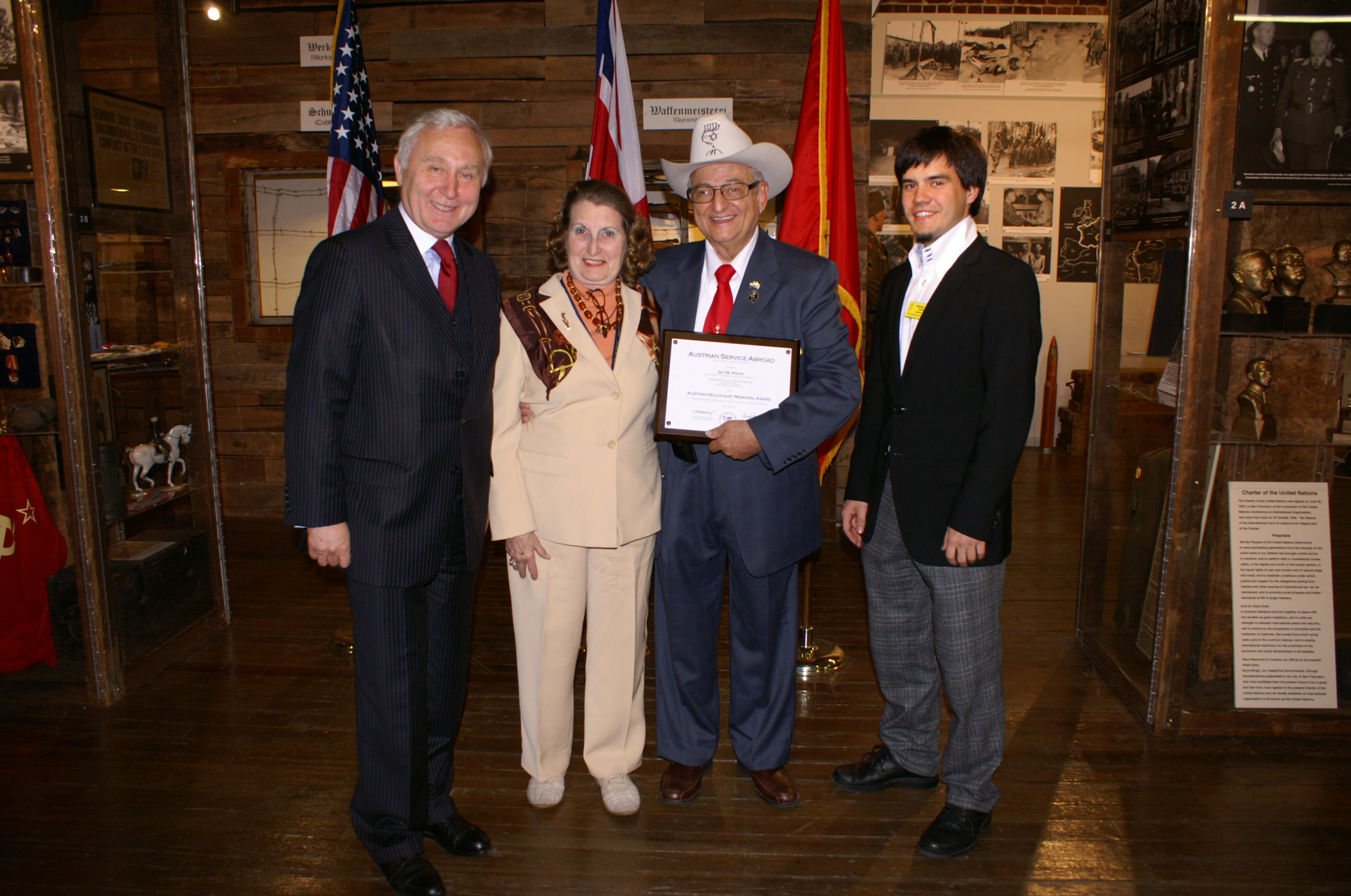
Jay M. Ipson receives the Austrian Holocaust Memorial Award from Christian Prosl

- On January 16, 2001, Jay M. Ipson received a First Freedom Award from the First Freedom Center.
- In 2005, he was honored with the Director's Community Leadership Award by the FBI in Richmond.
- On May 11, 2010, Jay M. Ipson was the first U.S. citizen to receive the Austrian Holocaust Memorial Award. Austrian Ambassador to the United States of America Dr. Christian Prosl officially visited the Virginia Holocaust Museum to present the award.

== See also ==
- History of the Jews in Lithuania
- List of Lithuanian Jews
