= Seirijai =

- Town
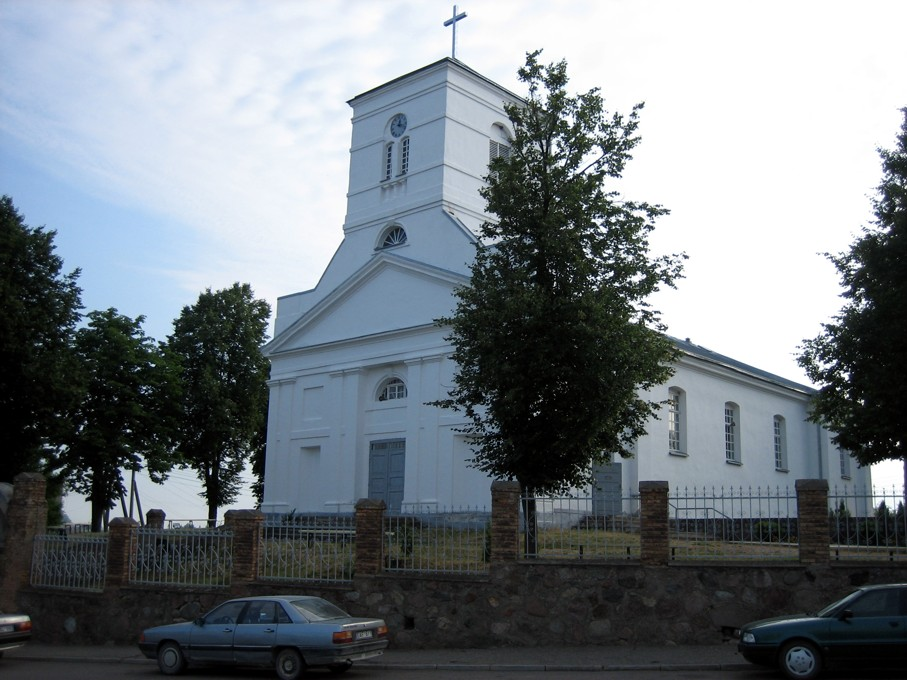

- Coat of arms

- Location in Lithuania
- Coordinates: 54°13′50″N 23°48′50″E
- Country: Lithuania
- Ethnographic region: Dzūkija
- County: Alytus County

Population (2021)
  - Total: 679
- Time zone: UTC+2 (EET)
  - Summer (DST): UTC+3 (EEST)

Seirijai is a small town in Alytus County in southern Lithuania. In 2011 it had a population of 788.

== Etymology ==
Seirijai toponym came from the lake Seirijis, which got its name from the creek Seira name of which is of Dainavian dielect of Lithuanian language (from Lithuanian word "sūrus" meaning either salty or soured). Derivative names in other languages are - Polish: Sereje, German: Serrey, English sometimes "Serey"

== History ==
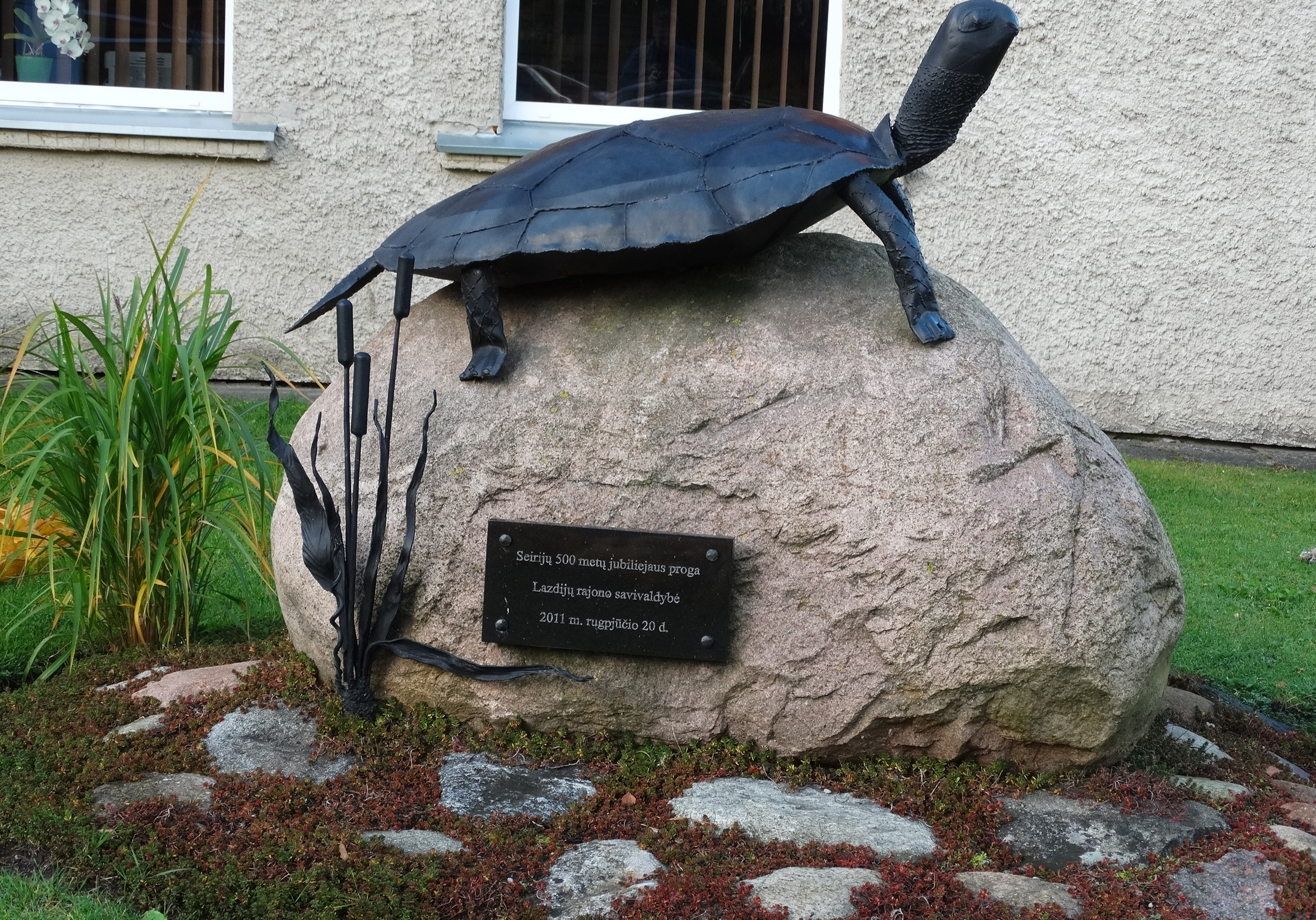
Symbol of Seirijai - European pond turtle

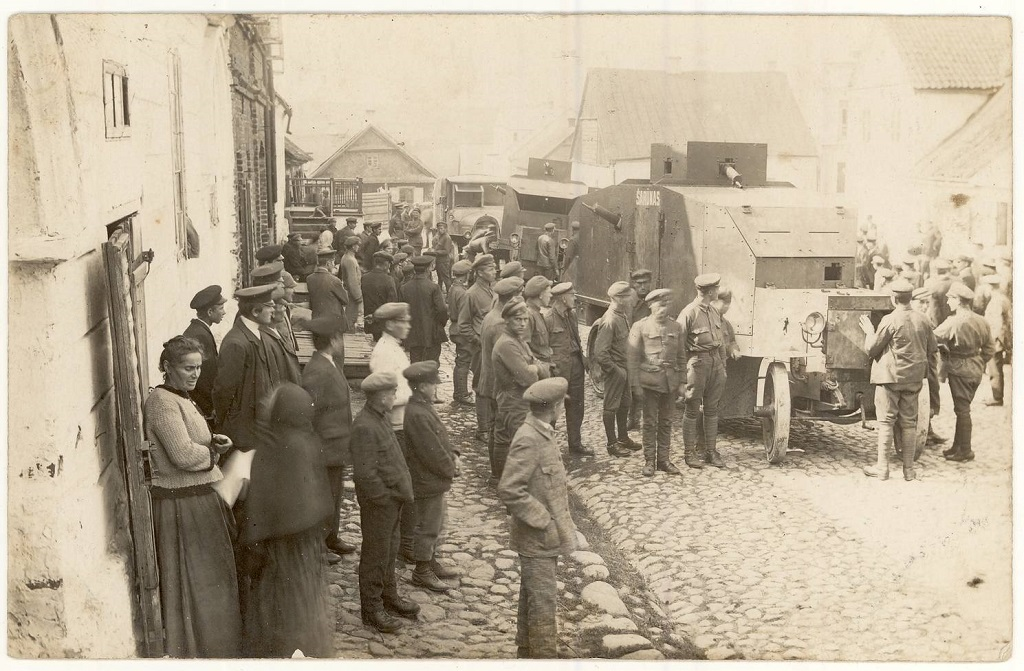
Lithuanian army in Seirijai with armored car Šarūnas, 1920

The lands were inhabited by the Lithuanian tribe Dainavians. Due to the frequent raids and pillaging of the Teutonic Order, the Dainavians moved to other parts of Lithuania abandoning the lands and Seirijai became a wilderness. From 1383 to 1398 Seirijai was in the State of the Teutonic Order. After the defeat of the Teutonic Order in the Battle of Grunwald and the Treaty of Melno (1422), the land became populated again and started to grow economically. Since the 16th century Serijai was known as a proprietary land of a ruler. King of Poland and Grand Duke of Lithuania Sigismund I the Old donated Seirijai to Jerzy Radziwiłł, and later it became a possession of Radziwill family. Jerzy Radziwill built a Catholic church in 1537. Already in 1564 the church was given to Calvinists, since many in the Radziwill family converted to Calvinism. The tensions between Catholics and Calvinists lasted up to 1655 and the Thirteen Years' War with Russia. Seirijai was devastated and the Calvinists retreated.

From 1691 until 1793 the district was a Prussian exclave within Poland-Lithuania (Preußisch Serrey). In 1793 it was ceded, along with Tauragė (Tauroggen), to Poland-Lithuania as "compensation" for the territories annexed in the Second Partition of Poland; it returned to Prussian control two years later in the Third Partition of Poland, this time as a fully contiguous part of Prussia within the New East Prussia province. In 1807 it passed by the Treaties of Tilsit to the Duchy of Warsaw, a Polish client state of the First French Empire. 1815 it became part of Congress Poland, a kingdom in a personal union with the Russian Empire; while formally separate from Russia, Congress Poland increasingly became de facto part of it, culminating in the 1867 establishment of the Vistula Land in its place. After World War I it became part of the newly independent Republic of Lithuania.

During the World War II almost all Seirijai was bombed by German army.

On September 11, 1941, 953 Jews from Seirijai were murdered in the Baraučiškės Forest, including 229 men, 384 women and 340 children. The mass execution was perpetrated by Rollkommando Hamann (Lithuanian: skrajojantis būrys, a small mobile unit that committed mass murders of Lithuanian Jews in the countryside across Lithuania in July–October 1941, with a death toll of at least 60,000 Jews.) / 1st Battalion 3rd Unit led by Norkus and Obelenis; Lithuanian Activists Front members from Seirijai

In 2018 a monument was built in Seirijai for Lithuanian partisans, who fought against Soviet occupants. Seirijai belonged to Dainava partisans military district.

== Economy ==
Company Seirijų žirgai, which keeps and breeds Trakehner horses.

== Notable people ==
- Alexander Ziskind Maimon (1809–1887) – Lithuanian Jewish author and scholar of the Talmud.
- Antanas Žmuidzinavičius (1876–1966) – Lithuanian painter.
- Bronius Kazys Balutis (1880–1967) – Lithuanian diplomat.
- Juozas Adomonis (g. 1932) – artist, ceramicist.
- Vidas Kavaliauskas (g. 1965) – Lithuanian linguist.
