= Maria Dangell =

Estonian singer (born 1974)

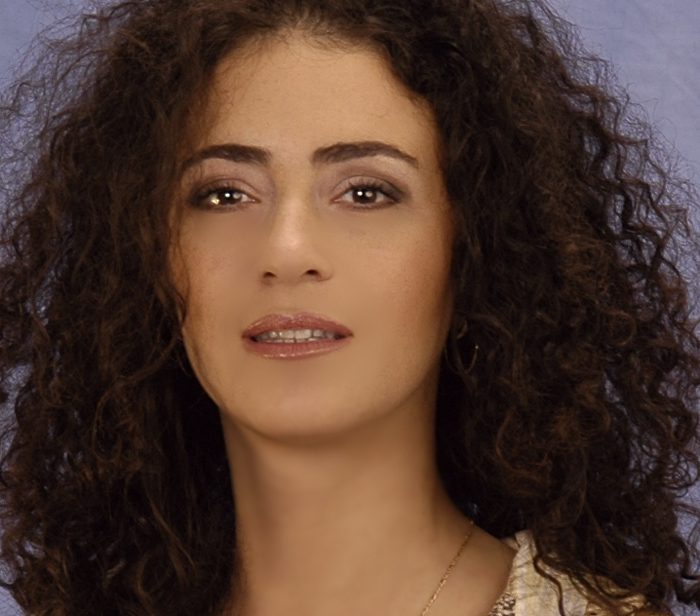

Background information
- Born: 30 March 1974 (age 52); Tallinn, then part of Estonian SSR, Soviet Union
- Occupations: Singer, pianist, songwriter
- Instrument: Piano
- Website: mariadangell.com

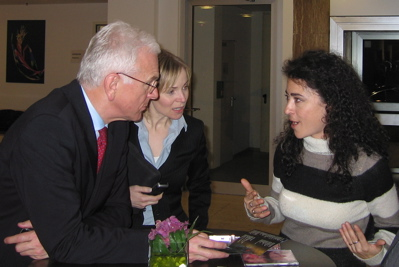
Dangell and Hans-Gert Pöttering discussing "Hearts of Peace in the Middle East", Düsseldorf 2008.

Maria Dangell (born 30 March 1974) is an Estonian singer, pianist, and songwriter.

Dangell was born in a Jewish family in Tallinn, Estonia. She started to learn classical piano at the Tallinn Music School (Estonian: Tallinna Muusikakool) at the age of seven, and eventually studied it at the Conservatoire. Her career of pianist, singer and songwriter began in early school years. She performed live on stage and in recording studios as soloist and producer of her own musical creations. She also participated in duet collaborations with Bobby Kimball (from Toto) on "The Heaven of Milano" and with Amedeo Minghi on "La Vita Mia", broadcast by RAI Uno on 28 March 2009 and on 1 September 2011.

Maria has been asked to collaborate on the "Hearts of Peace in the Middle East" project, whose goal is to open people's hearts and contribute to establishing peace in the Middle East. She sings the song "Jerusalem" ("Gerusalemme") written by Amedeo Minghi on Vatican's appeal. A performance of the song (Amedeo Minghi, Maria Dangell and Hakeem Abu Jaleela) took place on 1 April 2009 in Bethlehem in presence of 1500 pilgrims and media. She discussed the project with Hans-Gert Poettering, at the time the President of the European Parliament, in 2008 and brought it to the attention of international media and political institutions in order to get heard giving a clear example of how three world religions can open a peaceful dialogue among each other.
