= Anna Warburg =

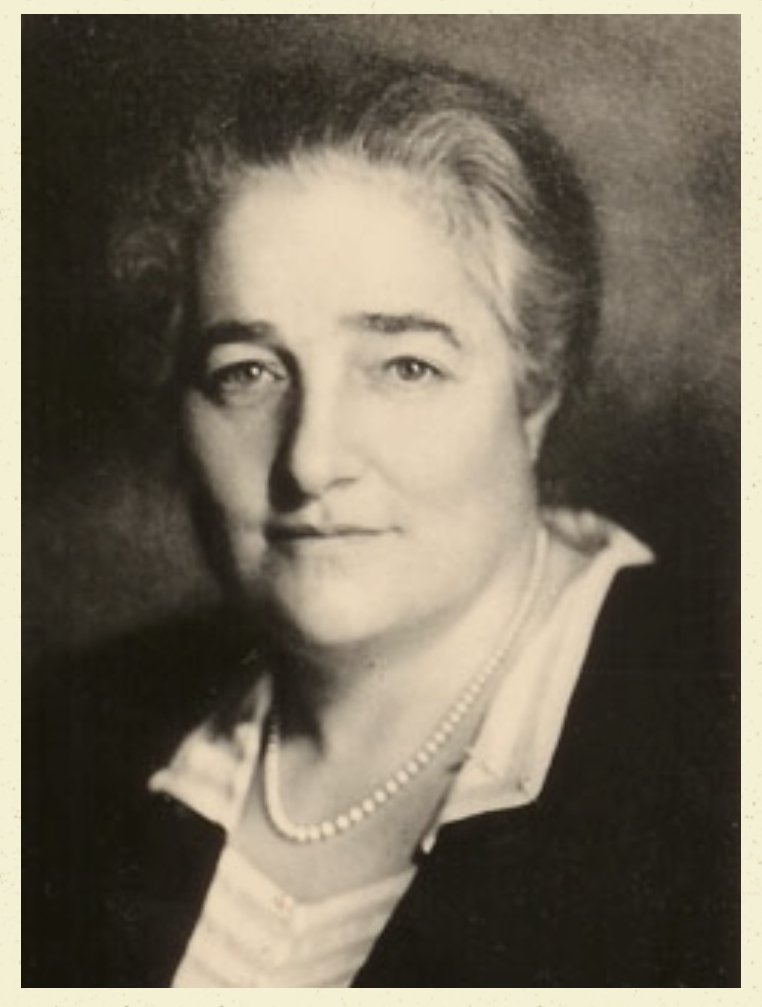
Anna Warburg

Anna Beata Warburg (27 December 1881, Stockholm — 8 June 1967, Netzer Sereni, Israel) was a Swedish-born Jewish kindergarten specialist who is remembered for her pioneering work both in Sweden and Germany. In 1896 she moved to Germany where she attended a course at the Pestalozzi-Fröbel Haus. Her interest in the Fröbel approach led to the establishment of a Fröbel kindergarten in Grängesberg, Sweden. During a further period in Germany, in 1911 she founded a kindergarten in Hamburg. On returning to Sweden in 1916, she helped found the Swedish Fröbel Foundation in 1918 before moving back to Germany where she ran the German Fröbel Federation until the Nazis rescinded her membership. Forced to leave Germany in 1938, she became an enthusiastic figure in the Swedish kindergarten movement. She and her husband spent their later years in Israel where she died in 1967.

== Early life, education and family ==
Born in Stockholm on 27 December 1881, Anna Beata Warburg was the daughter of Siegfried Samuel Warburg, a German-born Jew, and his wife Lea Ellen née Josefsson, who came from a Swedish Jewish family. She was the third of the family's four children. She attended Whitlockska samskolan, a private co-educational establishment in Stockholm. After being invited to stay with an uncle in Germany, she was able to take a course on kindergarten teaching at Pestalozzi-Fröbel Haus. In 1908, she married a distant relative, the Hamburg banker Fritz Warburg with who she had three daughters. They settled in Hamburg.

== Career ==
After experiencing highly unsatisfactory conditions in a Hamburg kindergarten, Warburg found a much more enlightened approach when she followed a course at the Pestalozzi-Fröbel House in Berlin. In 1909, she was elected as a board member of the Hamburg Fröbel School, serving on the examination commission from 1933. In 1910, she established a folk kindergarten where students from the Fröbel School could gain teaching experience. During a period back in Sweden, her interest in the Fröbel approach led to the establishment of a Fröbel kindergarten in Grängesberg.

Warburg headed the German Fröbel Federation until her membership was rescinded by the Nazis. Forced to leave Germany in 1938, she became an enthusiastic figure in the Swedish kindergarten movement. In 1957, she and her husband moved to Israel where they spent their later years.

Anna Warburg died on 8 June 1967 aged 85 at the Netzer Sereni kibbutz in Israel. The Anne-Warburg-Schule in Hamburg bears her name in commemoration of her contribution to education.
