= Shlomo Kleit =

Shlomo Kleit (Hebrew: שלמה קלייט; 1891–1962) was a leader of the Yiddishist / Socialist movement in Lithuania.

Kleit, who was a tailor by profession, became active in the General Jewish Labour Bund in Vilna (Vilnius, Lithuania), during the First World War, under the German occupation of the city, from 1915 to 1918. Kleit was active in the Jewish anti-Tsarist revolutionary movement, and the anti-German underground during those years. After World War I he was elected as the Socialist vice-president of the Vilna Kehilla. Kleit left Lithuania for political reasons and lived in Berlin, Cairo, Tel Aviv, Southern France and Toronto. With the assistance of Yaakov (Yankel) Pat, the international Bundist leader, Kleit went to the United States in 1927 and there worked as a teacher in the Arbeter Ring schools until his death.

During and after World War II, Kleit worked to rescue Jews from the Holocaust and to bring survivors into the United States from Cuba and possibly other countries. There is some evidence to indicate that the circle of groups and individuals included Hashomer Hatzair, returning war veterans, non-Jewish pilots and engineers and (with inconclusive evidence) mobsters such as Meyer Lansky and (somewhat questionably) Lucky Luciano.

Among Kleit's colleagues in Jewish education were Leo Dashefsky, Leah Vevetches, Pesach Simon and Michel Gelbart.
