= Anne Kalmering =

Swedish singer (born 1962)

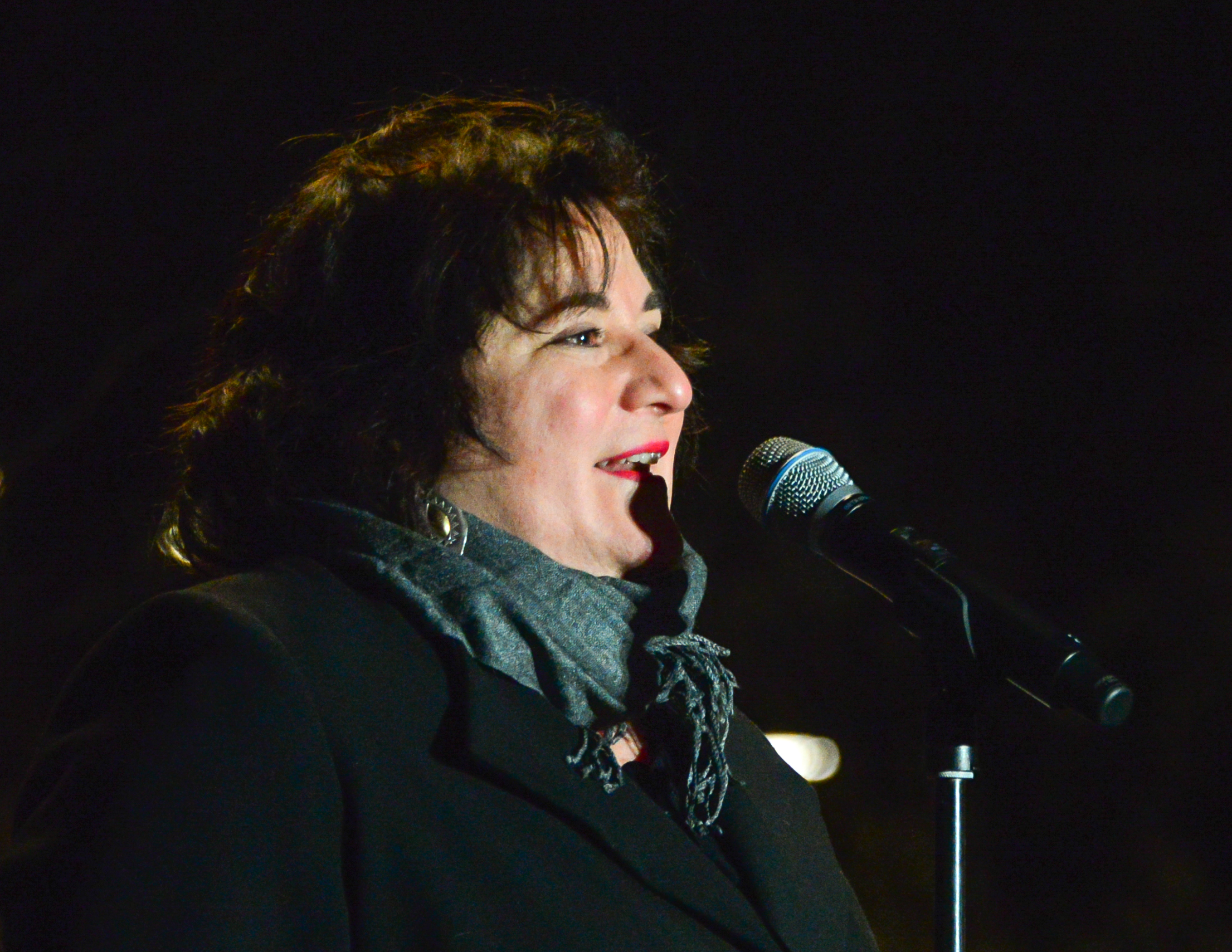
Anne Kalmering performs in 2018.

Anne Kalmering Josephson (born 1962) is a Swedish singer who also works in television and radio. From a Russian Ashkenazi Jewish background, Kalmering performs music influenced by various Jewish musical traditions, including klezmer and Sephardic music.

== Biography ==
Anne Kalmering was born in 1962 in Sweden, into a Russian Ashkenazi Jewish family. She began her involvement in traditional Jewish music as a child, and went on to study at the Teaterstudion drama school in Stockholm.

Kalmering performs songs from both the Ashkenazi and Sephardic musical traditions, singing in Yiddish, Ladino, and Hebrew. She is one of Scandinavia's most popular performers of Jewish music, and one of the most prominent voices for Jewish culture in Sweden.

As a singer, she regularly performs alongside the musician Hayati Kafe and the group Stahlhammer Klezmer Classic, among others. In 2019, she worked with Stahlhammer Klezmer Classic to produce the album Vayter. In 2020, they were nominated for an award at the Swedish Folk & World Music Gala.

Kalmering also performs in schools and leads a youth choir, Kum Zing Mit Undz ("Come Sing With Us"). In addition to her music, she works as a radio and TV presenter and host, with Sveriges Radio P1 airing her show Thoughts for the Day.

== Discography ==
- Ot Azoy ("Just So," 2000)
- Vilda Nätter ("Wild Nights," 2003)
- Vayter ("Farther," 2019, with Stahlhammer Klezmer Classic)
