= Marcus Choleva =

Danish businessman (1933–2021)

Marcus Choleva (12 April 1933 – 12 November 2021) was a Danish businessman. He was CEO of KFI (Købmændenes Finansieringsinstitut) from 1970 until 2012.

== Early life and education ==
Marcus Choleva was born on 12 April 1933 in the Frederiksberg district of Copenhagen, to parents of Latvian-Polish Jewish descent. His great-grandparents fled Eastern Europe due to rekindled anti-Semitism. His family was arrested by the Gestapo during World War II and subsequently sent to the concentration camp Theresienstadt in present-day Czech Republic. The Danish Jews in Theresienstadt were treated better than other European Jews in the concentration camp, and were not immediately deported to death camps like many of the other European Jews in the camp. Marcus Choleva and most of his family spent a year and a half in the concentration camp, surviving the Holocaust. Back in Denmark after the war, Choleva completed a master's degree in economics at University of Copenhagen.

== Career ==
Choleva initially worked for the bank Privatbanken and later for the Ministry of Finance. From 1970 he was CEO of Købmændenes Finansieringsinstitut (KFI). He left the company in 2012 and has later realized large profits on real estate investments.

== Philanthropist ==
Choleva donated a considerable amount of money and a vase of remembrance to the Israeli Holocaust museum, Yad Vashem.

== Personal life and death ==
Choleva had four children. He lived on an estate outside Birkerød. Choleva died on 12 November 2021, at the age of 88.
