= Alexander Ziskind Maimon =

Alexander Ziskind Maimon (July 18, 1809 - July 12, 1887) was a Lithuanian Jewish author and scholar of the Talmud and Mishnah.

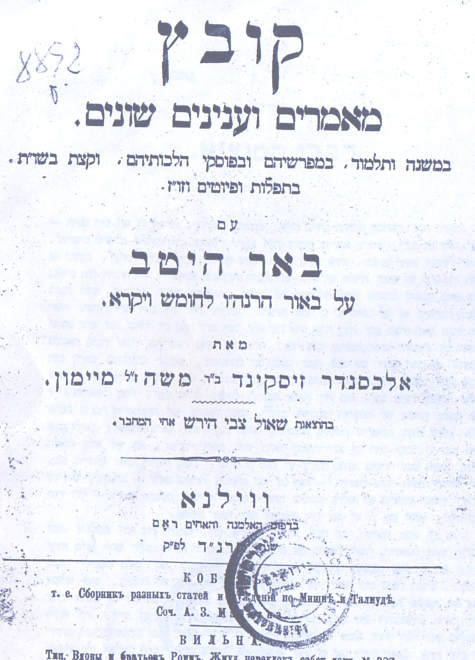
Title page of Ziskind's 1894 book

Maimon was born in Seirijai, Lithuania, then part of the Russian Empire to a family who claimed agnatic descent from Maimonides. His commentaries on biblical literature, Mishnah, Talmud and Halacha were publicized from his younger years and throughout his life. He was a writer for HaMagid Hebrew newspaper, known by the acronym of his and his father's name - AZBRMM (Alexander Ziskind ben Rabbi Moshe Maimon). His daughter's tombstone refers to him as "Maimon from Seirijai". In 1872 he is mentioned as "Rabbi Ziskind Maimon" in HaMagid in a list of people from Seirijai who donated to the Persian relief effort.

In his later years, Maimon lived in Kelmė and began writing his book Kovetz Maamarim ve'Inianim Shonim. The book was published by his family in 1894, following his death, and in it were many reprinted articles and research he had written. He is referred to in Berl Kagan's book Jewish Cities, Towns & Villages in Lithuania (New York: 1991) as: "An author, scholar, philanthropist, and man of affairs."

Maimon's grandson, Moshe Maimon, was a noted artist.
