= Shira Gorshman =

Shira Gorshman (April 10, 1906 – April 4, 2001) was a Yiddish language short story writer and memoirist.

== Biography ==
She was born in the small town of Krakės in the Kovno Governorate of the Russian Empire (present-day Lithuania) to an extremely poor family and began working at a young age. She was able to achieve a basic education, and like many Lithuanian Jews was multi-lingual. She was self-supporting by the time she was 14, and had her first daughter when she was 16.

At a young age, Gorshman moved to Kaunas, where she became active in Zionist organizations. In 1924, she moved to Mandatory Palestine as a pioneer, and there worked doing heavy labor with Gdud HaAvoda, a short-lived, left-wing Zionist organization intended to create mobile labor pools for the nascent Jewish colonies in Palestine. In Gdud ha-Avodah, members worked and lived together, pooling all income, while completing major construction projects such as road-building.

In 1928, with others from this group, Gorshman returned to the Soviet Union to build another utopian commune, this one an agricultural colony in Crimea. Her much later memoir, In di shpurn fun gdud ha-avodah (In the Footsteps of Gdud ha-Avodah), published in 1998, describes both communal undertakings.

In Crimea, Gorshman met Mendl Gorshman, a painter, and they moved to Moscow together. There, she began writing. Her stories were published in Yiddish newspapers in Kiev and Moscow, and in numerous anthologies. Gorhsman remained in Moscow for many years, writing short stories and memoirs. "The central hero in her work is the woman as a folk-figure in this uneasy historical epoch," wrote The Forward in her obituary. "This particular figure, through whom the writer embodied the important problems of reality, always appears in a time when the foundations of old forms of social organization are broken, and new relationships and alliances in social life and in the life of a new kind of family are being constructed." Gorshman moved to Israel in 1990, where she continued to write and publish her stories. She died in Ashqelon in 2001.

Her books include Der koyekh fun lebn (The Power of Life), 33 noveln (33 Stories), Lebn un likht (Life and Light), Yomtev inmitn vokh (Mid-Week Holiday), Oysdoyer (Resistance), Khanes shof un rinder (Chana's Sheep and Cows), Ikh hob lib arumforn (I Love to Wander), Vi tsum ershtn mol (As If For the First Time), On a gal (Without Malice), and the aforementioned In di shpurn fun gdud ha-avodah. Very little of her work is available in English translation, but a story of hers appears in the anthology Found Treasures and another is found in Beautiful as the Moon, Radiant as the Stars.
