= Virginia Holocaust Museum =

Coordinates: 37°31′51.14″N 77°25′34.11″W

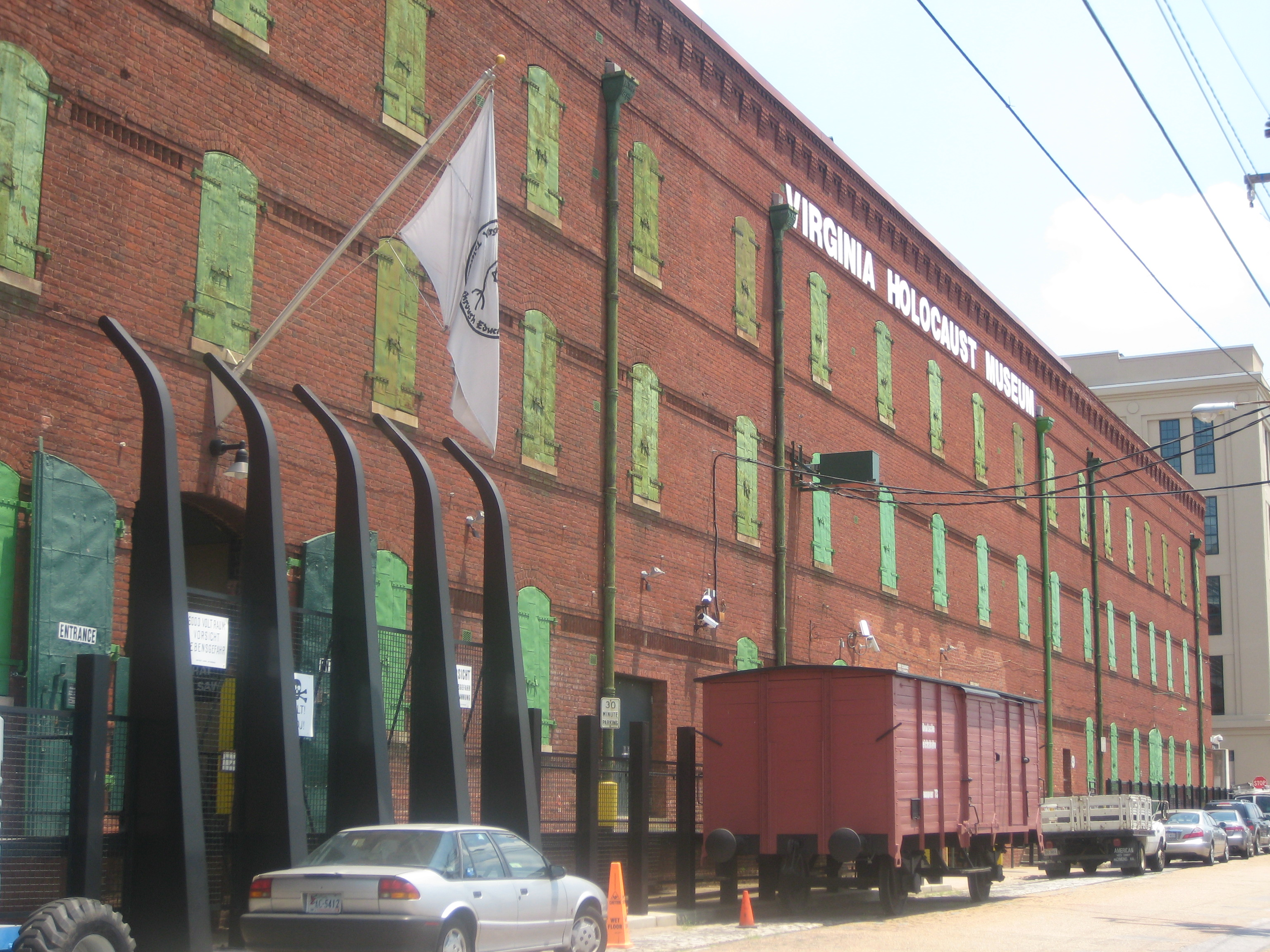
- Established: 1997
- Location: 2000 East Cary Street, Richmond, Virginia
- Type: Holocaust museum
- Website: Official website

The Virginia Holocaust Museum (VHM) is a public history museum located in Richmond, Virginia, United States, dedicated to interpreting the history of the Holocaust through survivor testimony, artifacts, and educational programming.

== History ==
The VHM first opened in 1997, founded by Mark Fetter, Jay Ipson, and Al Rosenbaum. Housed in the former Education building at Temple Beth El, the museum became an attraction for school field trips. Within a few years, the museum outgrew the space at Temple Beth El, and required additional space to handle the growing number of visitors and school groups. The Virginia General Assembly offered the American Tobacco Company Warehouse for the relocation of the museum. After restoration and reconfiguration of the building, the expanded Virginia Holocaust Museum was dedicated on Yom HaShoah, the Holocaust Day of Remembrance, 2003.

The Virginia Holocaust Museum has grown steadily since 2003, and now has an average of over 26,000 visitors each year. The VHM remains an important location for Virginia field trips, with students from over 100 middle and high schools visiting yearly.

The museum began an extensive ongoing exhibition renovation project in 2015. Much of the permanent exhibition had never been updated since opening in 2003, and the renovations serve to both update the information contained with newly uncovered facts and figures, as well as update the core exhibition space to modern standards.

== Mission ==
Founded to educate the community about the tragedies of the Holocaust, the Virginia Holocaust Museum memorializes and archives the atrocities of World War II. Through exhibits, programming, and outreach, the Museum uses the history of genocide to teach the dangers of prejudice and indifference.

== Exhibits ==
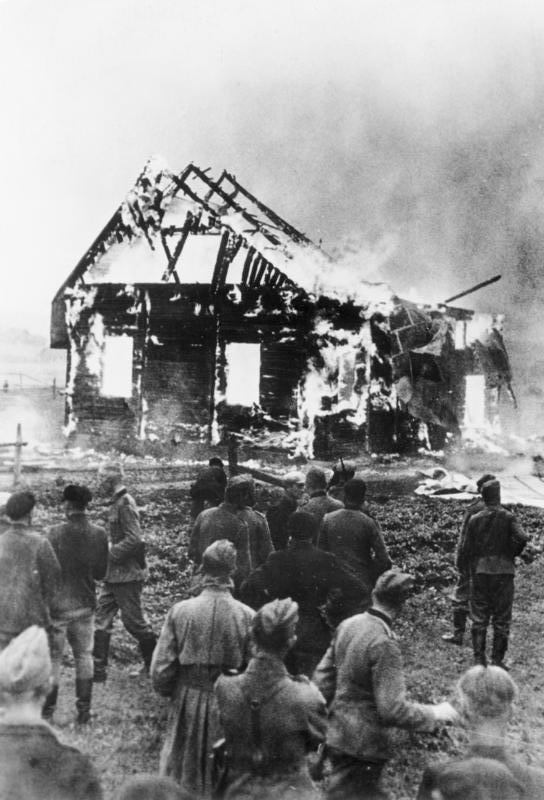
German soldiers and locals watch a Lithuanian synagogue burn, 9 July 1941

=== Core exhibition ===
Located on the first floor of the museum, the core exhibits narrate the history of the Holocaust. As visitors progress through these exhibits—and chronologically through the events of the Holocaust—they are presented with a glimpse into the systematic destruction of European Jewry. 300 artifacts and the testimonies of local Holocaust survivors expand upon this history, representing the tangible and personal realities of this event.

=== German Güterwagen ===
In 2004, the VHM acquired an authentic "goods wagon," or freight car, used during the Third Reich. Alexander Lebenstein, a local Holocaust survivor, worked with the museum to bring this important artifact to Richmond. Visitors have the opportunity to enter the artifact and imagine the conditions experienced by the people transported in this type of rail car.

=== Ipson Saga ===
At the center of the VHM's core exhibits is the story of a single family, the Ipsons. The Ipson Saga exhibition shares the experience of a family of local Holocaust survivors whose confinement in the Kovno Ghetto and harried escape to a farm in the Lithuanian countryside highlight the constant dangers Jews faced during the Holocaust.

=== Nuremberg Courtroom ===
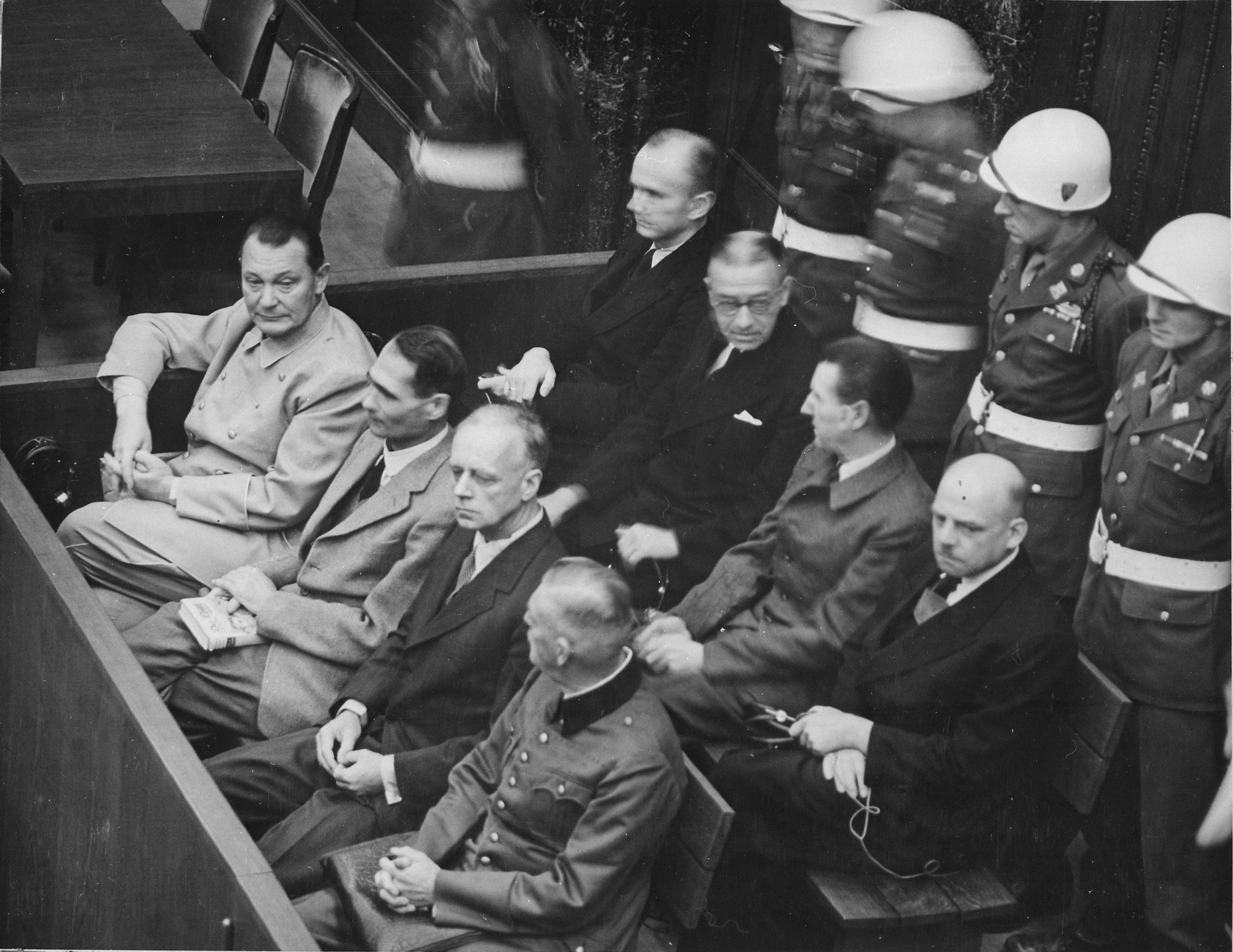
Defendants in the dock at the Nuremberg Trials

The Nuremberg Trials were the first international trials of major Nazi war criminals. As such, they served as a major source of documents and testimony for early Holocaust scholarship. The Nuremberg Courtroom exhibit gives visitors the chance to see a full recreation of Room 600 at the Palace of Justice, used during the International Military Tribunals, and to experience the gravity of the trials. The Nuremberg Courtroom exhibit was opened to the public by Virginia Governor Tim Kaine during a ceremony in April 2008.

== See also ==
- List of Holocaust memorials and museums in the United States
