= Idel Jakobson =

Estonian NKVD officer

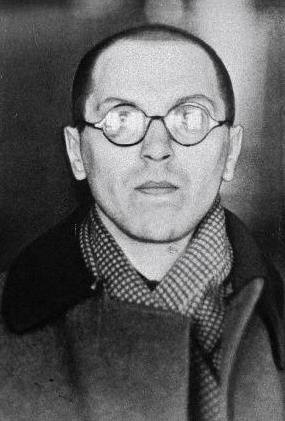
Idel Jakobson

Idel Jakobson (12 August 1904 in Jēkabpils, Russian Empire – 12 September 1997 in Tallinn, Estonia) was an NKVD officer. According to the materials of Kaitsepolitsei, Jakobson took part in sentencing around 1,200 people to death and persecuting and torturing at least 1,800 people.

Jakobson was at first a citizen of Latvia, but moved to Estonia in the 1930s. He participated in the activities of the Jewish cultural society Licht. In 1931 he was arrested in Tallinn, being accused of subversive activities directed against the Republic of Estonia. In 1938, together with a number of other communists, he was granted amnesty and deported to Latvia. He returned to Estonia after the June 1940 communist coup and became an investigator of the NKVD, since September 1940 leading the investigations' department of the NKVD of the Estonian SSR. Idel Jakobson was notorious for his sadistic methods (beatings, other methods of torture) during interrogations.

Jakobson fled Estonia in July, 1941, and worked as a chief investigator in Russia and Ukraine. His 'investigations' were carried out in the framework of the so-called 'Vyshinsky doctrine', in effect presumption of guilt: without a trial, he arranged a death sentence to 621 people. Most of his victims were ethnic Estonians, including well-known politicians like Ado Birk and Jaan Hünerson. He returned to Estonia in 1944, working as the head of investigation department until 1950. He was expelled from CPSU in 1953 for having visited a private Jewish canteen and concealing that fact. His CPSU membership was restored in 1956.

In 1990s, an investigation on I. Jakobson's activities during his NKVD 'career' was launched, but the case never reached the court, as Jakobson died.
