= Teleshopping =

Teleshopping may refer to:

- Home shopping
- Online shopping
- Shopping channel
- Infomercial
