= Pinske =

Pinske is a German surname. Notable people with the surname include:

- Andrea Pollack (later Pinske; 1961–2019), German swimmer
- Bastian Pinske (born 1978), German football player
- Michael Pinske (born 1985), German judoka, son of Andrea

== See also ==
- Pinsker
