= Shimson Kleuger =

Last Jewish resident of Oświęcim

- Szymon Kluger
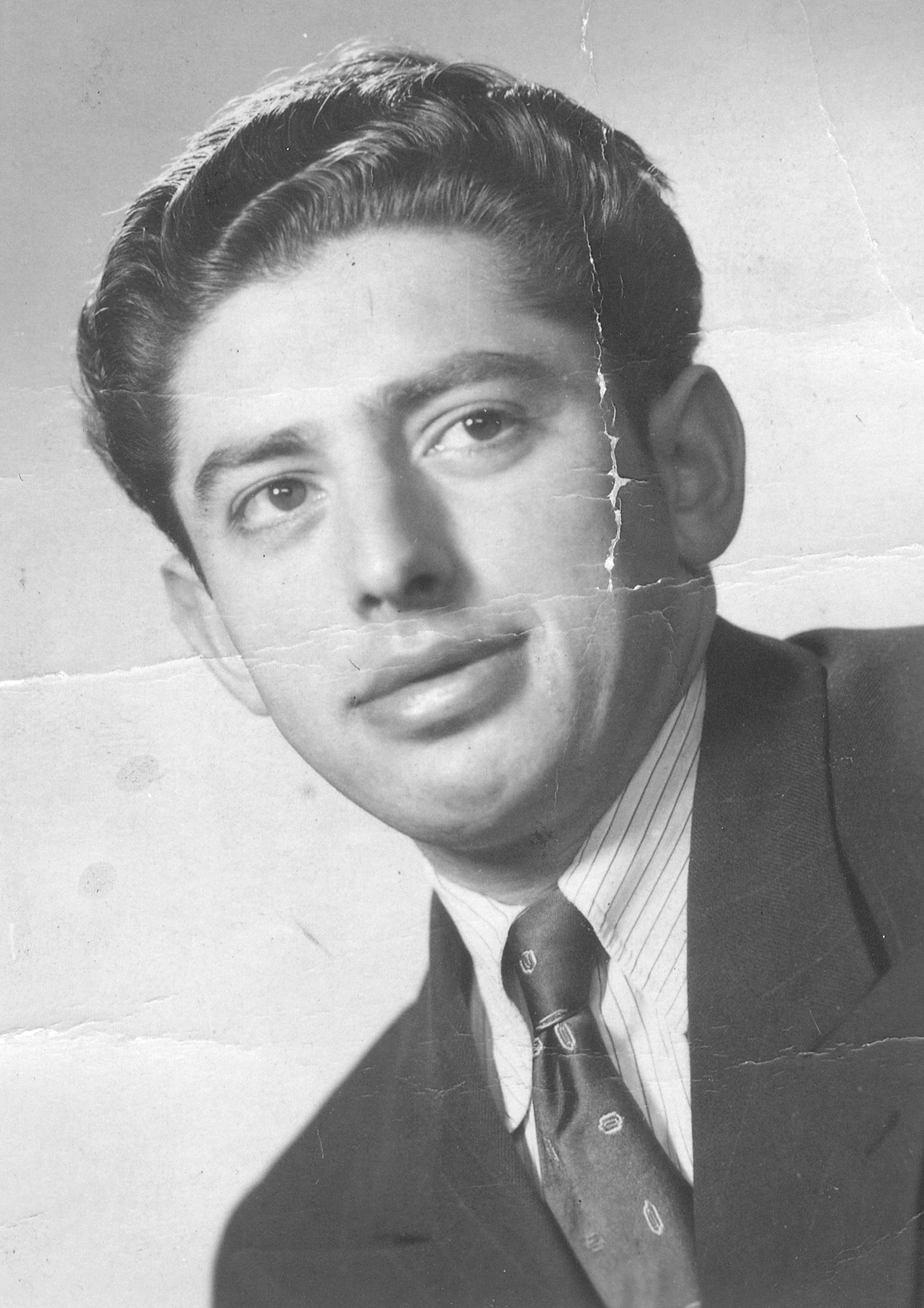
- Kluger in the 1950s
- Born: 19 January 1925; Oświęcim, Poland
- Died: 26 May 2000 (aged 75); Oświęcim, Poland
- Resting place: Jewish Cemetery, Oświęcim
- Known for: Last known Jewish person in Oświęcim, Poland

Shimson Kleuger (also Szymon Klieger or Szymon Klüger; 19 January 1925 – 26 May 2000) was a Polish Holocaust survivor and the last openly Jewish person to live in the town of Oświęcim, Poland, (German: Auschwitz) from 1962 until his death in 2000. Although Oświęcim had a Jewish community making up over half the town with 8,000 people before 1939, all other known Jewish residents, including the rest of Kleuger's family, had either fled in the large-scale exodus shortly before the occupation of Poland by Nazi Germany during World War II or were deported to concentration camps by Nazi authorities. Of the few survivors, Kluger was the only Jewish resident to return to Oświęcim, for which he became known as "The Last Jew in Auschwitz". This was especially prominent due to the nearby presence of the infamous Auschwitz concentration camp.

== Early life ==
=== Childhood and family ===
Kleuger was born on 19 January 1925 in Oświęcim. He came from a Hasidic Jewish family. Not much is known about his life. The family had a small house which was adjacent to the Oświęcim Synagogue. The house originally belonged to Shimson's maternal grandfather, Bernard Teichman and his daughter, Frymet. They bought it in 1928. Bernard Teichman was in the dry-goods trade in Oświęcim. He also owned a second hand goods shop in Bytom. Shimson's father, Symcha, was a melamed, or religious teacher – one of the eight religious teachers in Oświęcim.

=== World War II ===
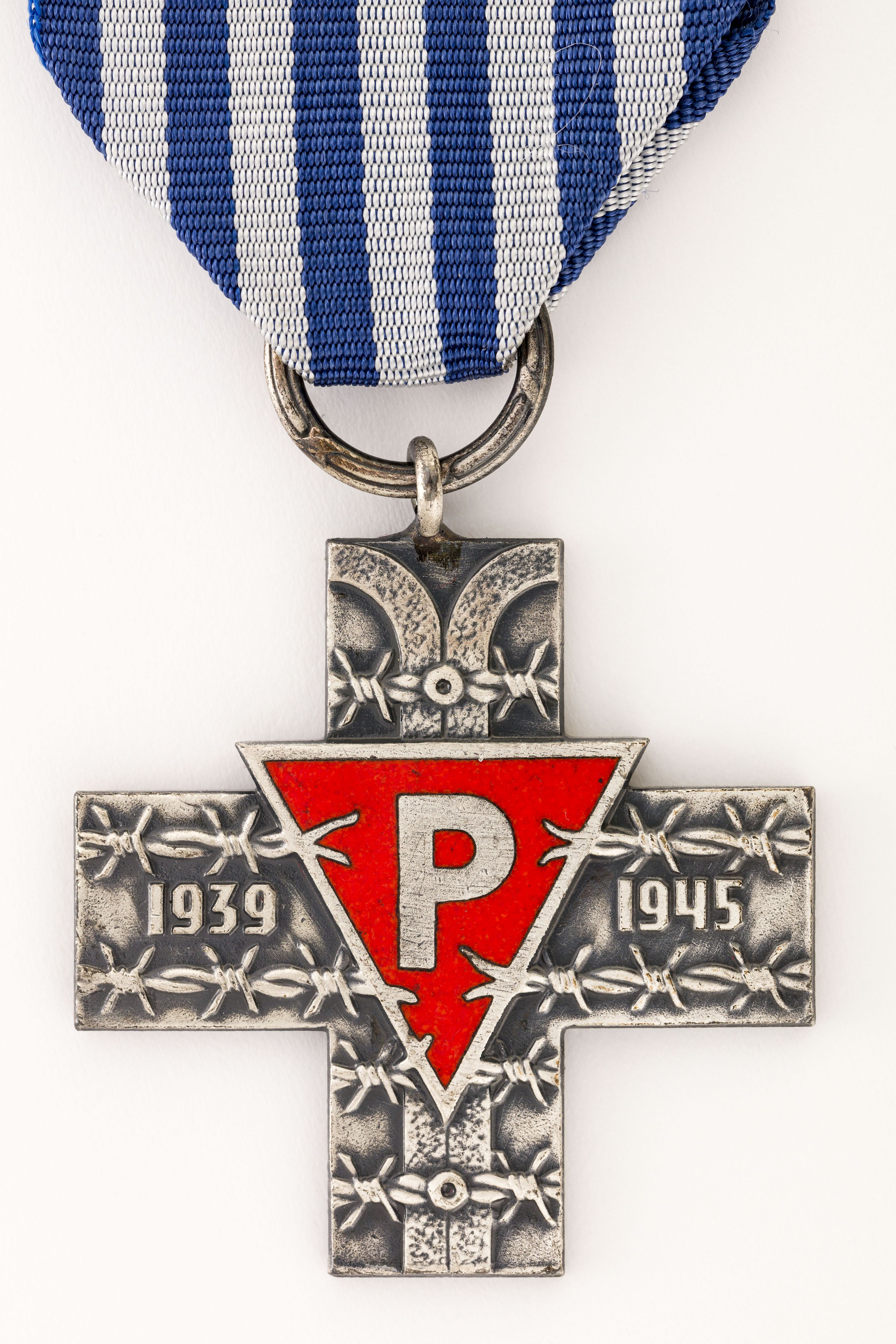
Shimson Kleuger's Auschwitz Cross

In 1939, when World War II broke out, Szymon was 14 years old. He witnessed the gradual liquidation of the Jewish community in Oświęcim and probably saw the Nazis set fire to and destroy the Great Synagogue in September 1939. In 1941, probably together with part of his family, he ended up in the ghetto in Będzin (Bendsburg). During the liquidation of the ghetto, he was first sent to the Blechhammer camp (Auschwitz-Birkenau sub-camp in Kędzierzyn-Koźle), and then to the Buchenwald and Gross Rosen camps. His KZ number was 179539.

Although it is not known where he was interned, the rabbi who prepared him for burial confirmed that he had a number used for identification of inmates in German concentration camps on his arm:

I can't say that means he was in Auschwitz, but he was in one of the camps, for sure.

As he worked in an Auschwitz sub-camp and Auschwitz was the only Nazi Concentration Camp to use tattoos, he had to have been processed through Auschwitz, therefore he was an inmate of the notorious camp.

Of the nine Kleuger siblings, only three survived the Holocaust, his brother Mojżesz and sister Bronia. After his camp was liberated, Shimson Kleuger went to Sweden. Mojżesz and Bronia emigrated to the United States.

== Later life in Oświęcim ==
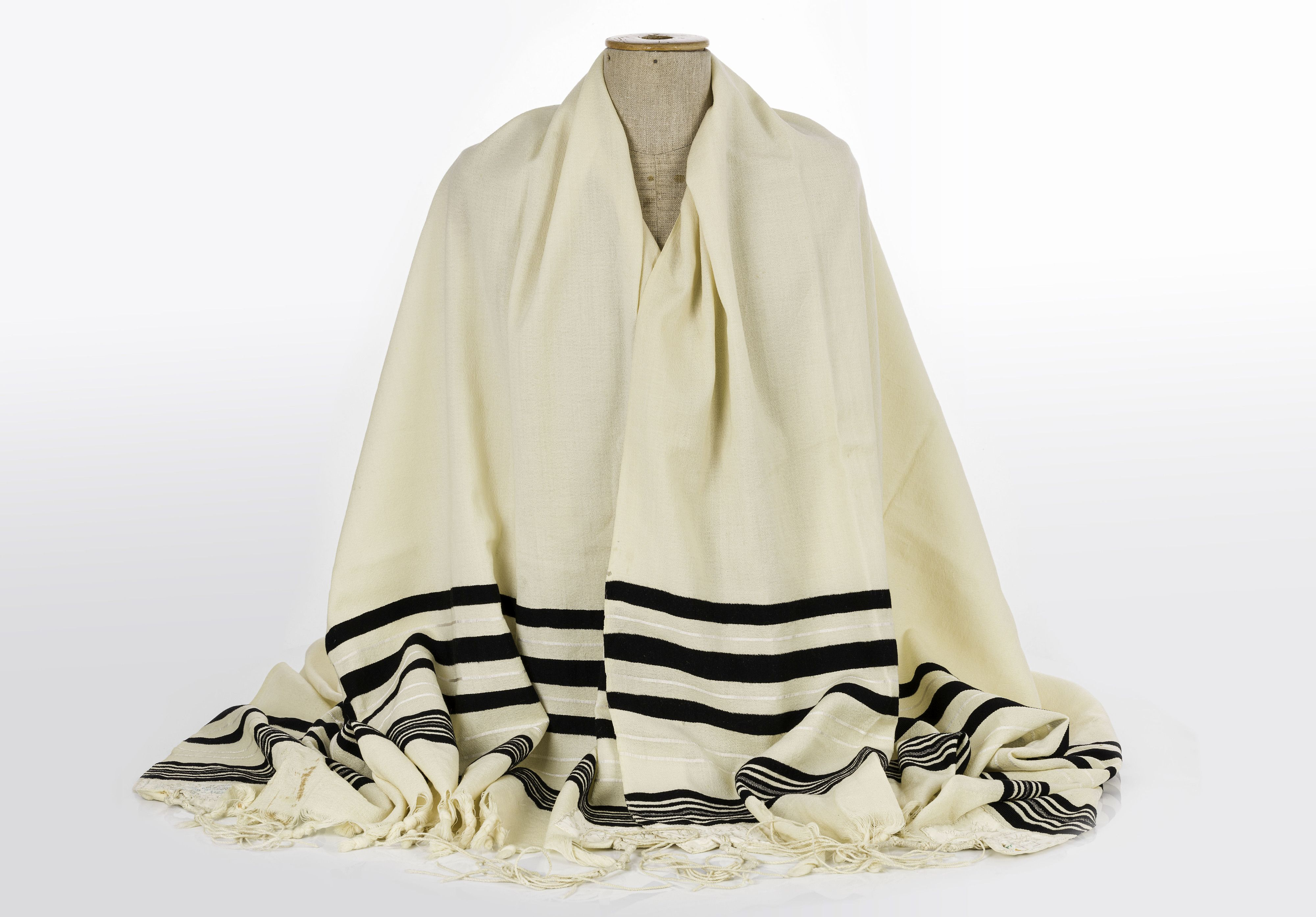
A tallit found at Kleuger House

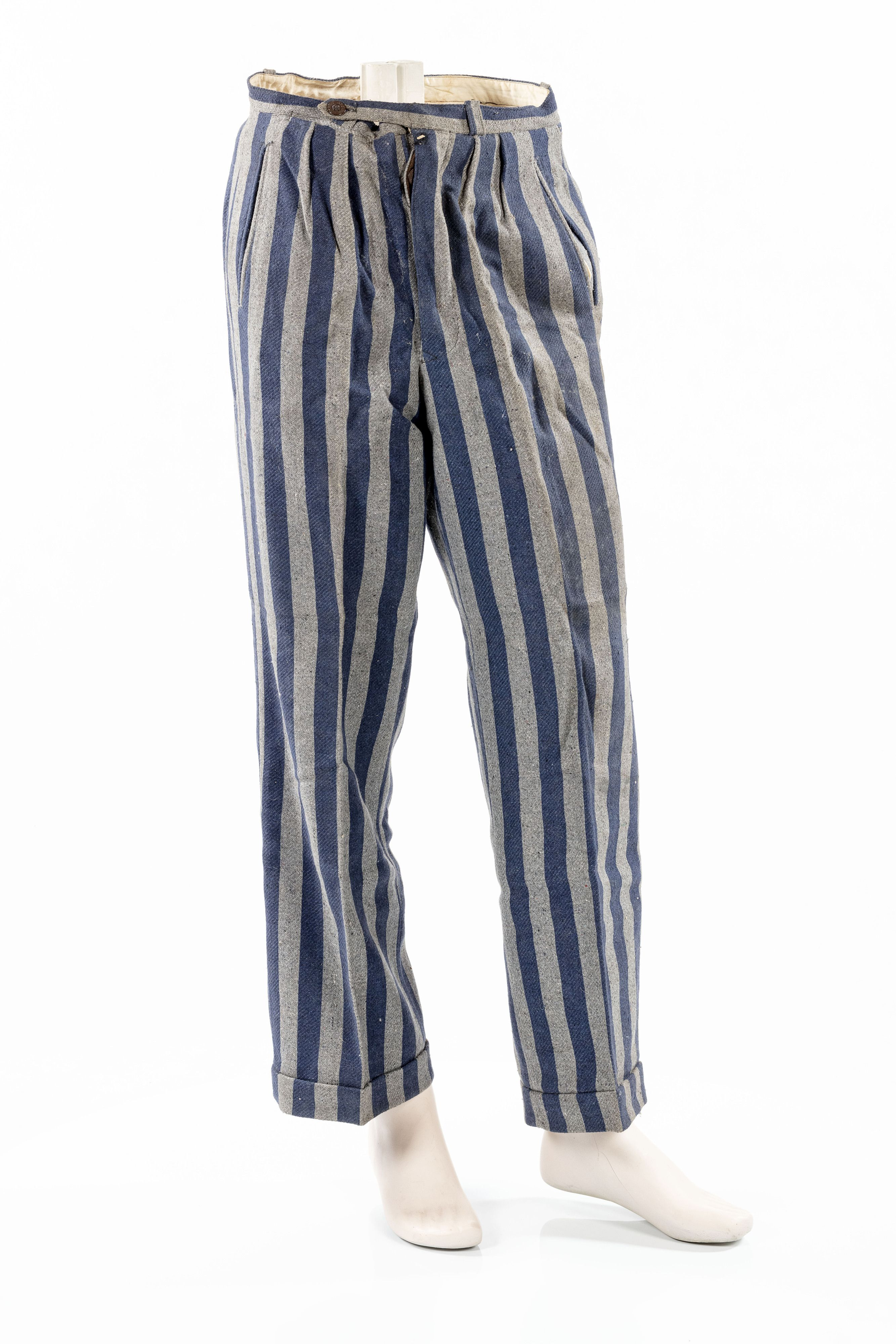
Trousers from a concentration camp uniform owned by Shimson Kleuger, interned in three KZ camps

In 1962, despite the protests of his family, he returned to Oświęcim and lived on the ground floor of the family house (at that time 287 Podzamcze Street, now 2 ks. Jana Skarbka Square). On his return, he found that all the other surviving Jews had left for America or Israel.

In his 1994 book, From Oswiecim to Auschwitz, Moshe Weiss writes of a meeting with him:

Upon leaving the death camp at Auschwitz/Birkenau, I stopped in the town to visit Shimek Kluger, the last remaining Jew in Oświęcim. He offered me refreshments and an hour of gentle conversation, in which he reiterated his hope to leave Poland soon and join his brother and his family in Brooklyn, New York. Before departing, I presented him with a talit, a mezuzah, and two yarmulkes.

He worked in the then Chemical Plant in Oświęcim (now Synthos), until he unexpectedly stopped showing up for work. Kleuger may have suffered from psychological effects of having gone through the trauma of three Nazi concentration camps. He began to lock himself in the house, which was increasingly falling into disrepair. Over time, Kleuger completely stopped going out.

Kleuger only left his house on Fridays in order to light Sabbath candles by the wall of the Lom'dei Mishnayos synagogue, which had been used as a carpet warehouse. Kleuger intended to restore the synagogue and to the few people with whom he had spoken, he said that he believed himself to be the synagogue's guardian. The renovation of the synagogue was finally possible due to the initiative of the Auschwitz Jewish Center. Today Kleuger's house is part of a museum devoted not to the Holocaust, but to the life of Jews from Oświęcim. In the former house of Szymon Kluger, a modern cafe has been set up.

== Death and burial ==
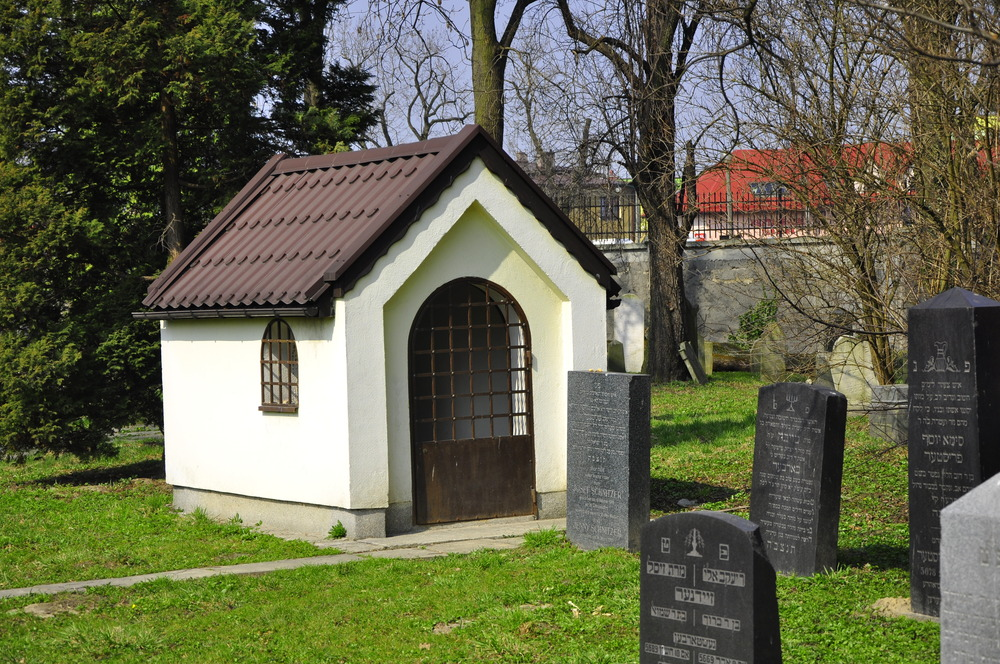
Kleuger's ohel at the Jewish cemetery in Oświęcim

Shimson Kleuger died in Oświęcim on 26 May 2000, three months before the renovation of the Oświęcim Synagogue was completed. There were no Jews remaining in Oświęcim to prepare him for burial in the correct manner (Jewish law prescribes a ritual washing prior to burial). The closest rabbi, Rabbi Sacha Pecaric of Kraków, was summoned. He went to the mortuary in Auschwitz to perform the taharah ceremony. A minyan, a quorum of 10 males over the age of 13, was also required – a busload of American Jewish students agreed to attend the funeral to make up this number. Kleuger was the last person buried in the old Oświęcim Jewish cemetery which had been revived after the war.

== Kleuger House ==
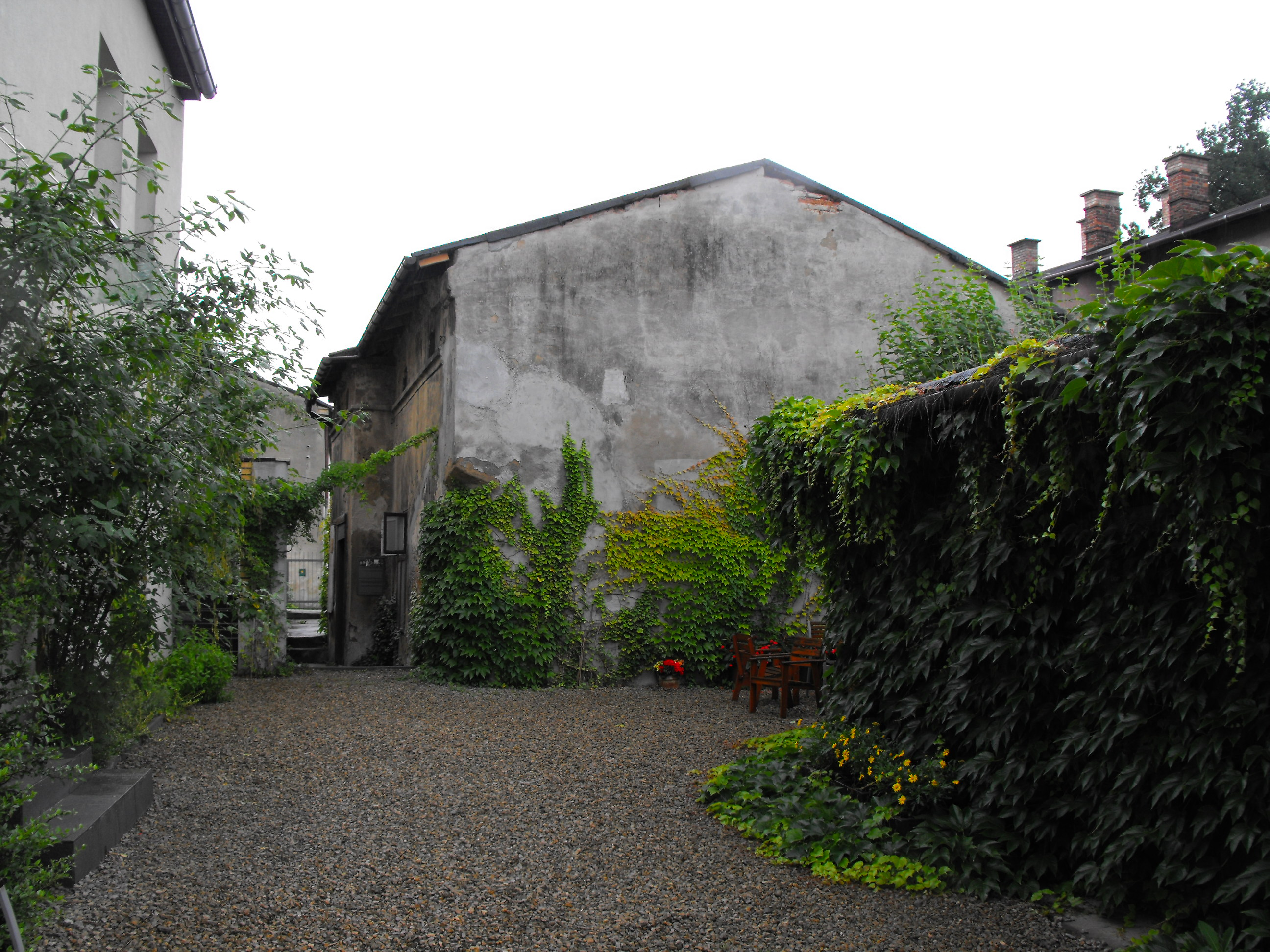
Kluger's house before renovation, where Kleuger increasingly isolated himself in, likely as a result of trauma left by the experiences of the Holocaust.

After Shimson Kleuger died, his siblings, Moshe and Bronia, donated the house to the Auschwitz Jewish Center, which also runs the Oświęcim Synagogue and the adjacent Jewish museum. The house was converted into a cafe called Cafe Bergson with the help of a Kickstarter campaign in 2014. The AJC carried out renovation work and converted the house to the Cafe Bergson museum café, along with educational and exhibition space. The original entrance door with a mark of a mezuzah has been preserved and the historical elements of the building inside have been exposed.

At Cafe Bergson, cultural and educational projects are organized: visitors learn about the past of Oświęcim and contemporary subjects such as human rights and the natural environment.

== See also ==
- Auschwitz Jewish Center in Oświęcim
