= Scott Pinsker =

American novelist

Scott Pinsker is an American filmmaker, talk-show host, author and celebrity publicist. He has written for Foxnews.com, The Washington Times, Breitbart, Jewish World Review, and Bulldog Reporter. He was the creator and executive producer of National Lampoon's Strip Poker in 2005, and also appeared in Brett Morgen's political documentary Ollie's Army. His novel, The Second Coming: A Love Story, was released in June 2014.

== Early life and education ==
Pinsker was president of the College Republicans at James Madison University in the 1990s. His support for Oliver North and infiltration of the rival political organization Clean Up Congress, were the subject of director Brett Morgen's film, Ollie's Army.

== Career ==
After graduating from George Mason University School of Law, Pinsker hosted The Stretch for WTMA radio in Charleston, South Carolina, from 2000 to 2001. Among his radio highlights was Charleston City Councilman Kawadjo Campbell announcing that he was leaving the Democratic Party.

Pinsker moved to Tampa Bay, Florida in 2003 and began a career in public relations. He began representing professional poker player Phil Gordon, who was the host of NBC/Bravo Network's Celebrity Poker Showdown. At a celebrity poker tournament in Houston, Texas, Pinsker decided to make a poker comedy, but to use "real" poker action instead of scripted reenactments. Kato Kaelin, one of the celebrity participants, was employed by National Lampoon at the time and introduced Pinsker to National Lampoon executives. Soon, a deal was struck.

National Lampoon's Strip Poker was filmed at the Hedonism II nudist resort in Negril, Jamaica, and featured models, actresses, and reality TV stars in a No Limit Texas Hold 'Em poker tournament. Pro Poker Hall of Famer Barbara Enright served as the poker coach. The film aired on DirecTV and InDemand Pay Per View in 2005, and had one of the first film appearances of Olivia Munn, who is credited as Lisa Munn. Pinsker then worked as publicist for Michael Vick and HSN home shopping host Bob Circosta. He also wrote about marketing and commented on TV and radio.

In June 2014, Pinsker published the novel, The Second Coming: A Love Story. He explained in a June 16 interview with Rob McConnell of the 'X' Zone Radio Network that he'd been working on the story for 15 years. Described as a "theological thriller," Pinsker claims it's the first book ever written about the apocalyptic "End Days" battle between God and Satan from a marketing perspective. His hypothesis is that a theologian can explain the beliefs of Jesus, but it takes a marketer to explain the actions of Satan.

== Bibliography ==
- The Second Coming: A Love Story (2014) ISBN 978-1500167219
