= Jewish Cemetery, Oświęcim =

Oświęcim Jewish Cemetery
- Cmentarz żydowski w Oświęcimiu
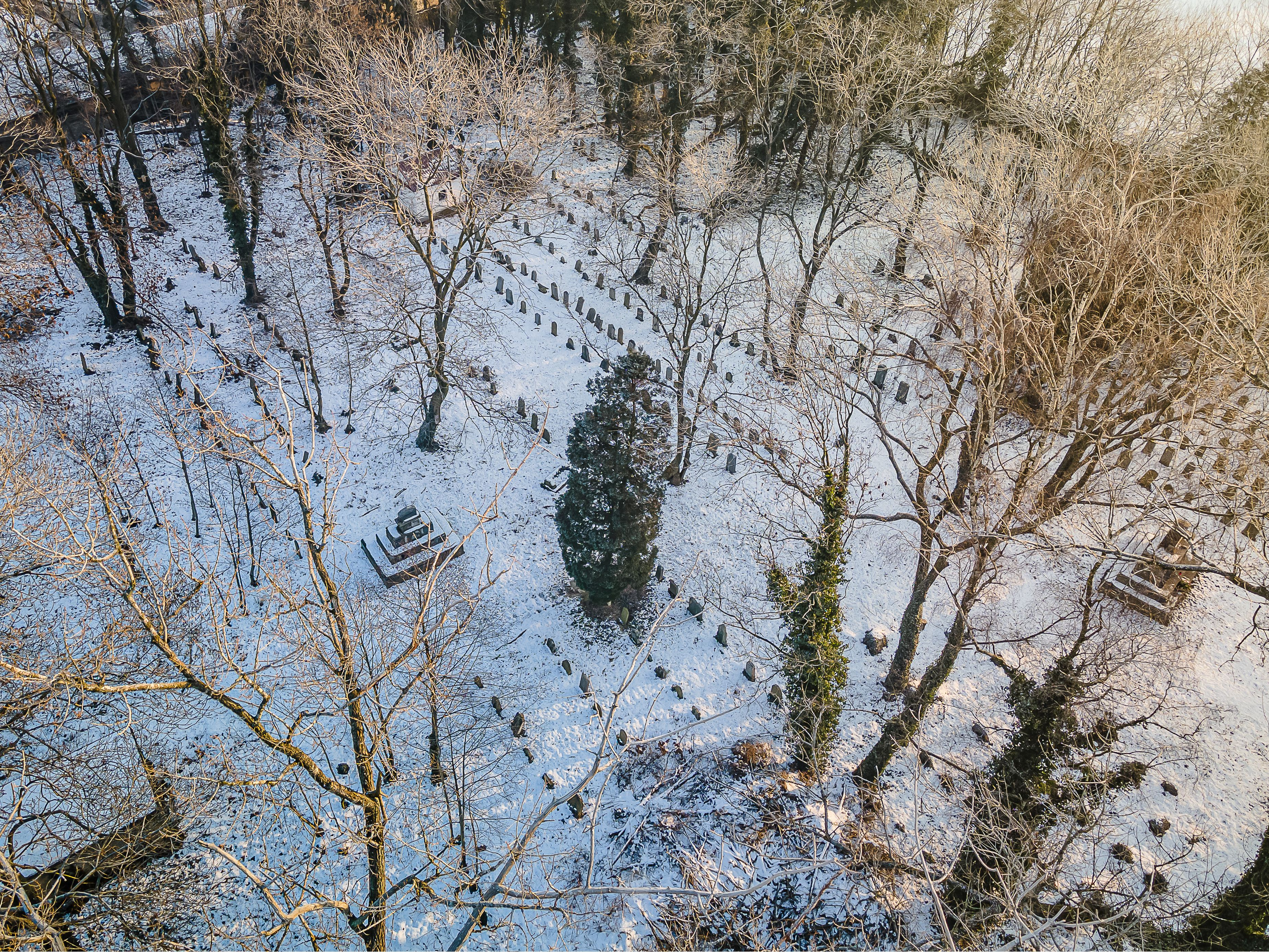
- Jewish Cemetery in winter
- Interactive map of Oświęcim Jewish Cemetery

Details
- Established: 1784
- Location: Oświęcim
- Country: Poland
- Coordinates: 50°02′21″N 19°14′02″E

The Jewish Cemetery is a cemetery in Oświęcim, Poland. It was destroyed by the Germans during World War II and partly restored by returning Jewish survivors after the Holocaust. In Communist Poland it fell into disrepair, but it was fully restored in the 1990s.

== History ==
There was a previous Jewish cemetery in Oświęcim but its location has been lost. The earlier cemetery was established around 1588 (preserved documents indicate that this year land was given to the local Jewish community for the construction of a cemetery and a synagogue). The original cemetery was closed at the end of the 18th century, due to regulations requiring the cemeteries to be moved outside the inner cities. In 1784, a site was marked out in Oświęcim for a new Jewish cemetery, which now exists.

The cemetery was established in 1784 at the junction of Dabrowskiego and Wysokie Brzegi Streets. Originally it covered an area of 26 zagons (0.5 hectares). The Jewish community paid 30 złotys per year for the site and also employed their own undertaker and administrator. The oldest matzevah found in the cemetery is the gravestone of Abraham Aba, son of Asher Zelig, who died on October 21, 1757. The tombstone was originally located at the oldest cemetery, and then moved to the present location. The matzevah features an inscription in Hebrew. It has been restored and is exhibited at the Jewish Museum at the Auschwitz Jewish Center.

In July 1941 the cemetery was closed by the occupying German authorities. Following closure, the cemetery was ransacked for construction material. The matzevot were used as building materials, thrown into the Soła River, abandoned elsewhere in the city. Local residents found them in various locations after the end of the war. The area of the cemetery was also dramatically reduced.

== Post war ==
After the war a few Jews returned to Oświęcim and made efforts to restore the cemetery. A letter sent in 1946 from the Jewish Committee in Oświęcim to the Jewish Committee in Krakow, states:

"The terrain of the cemetery is not fenced off, and half of it has been completely dug up. The construction of a cemetery wall is an urgent matter given that the terrain of the cemetery is used as a transit road. A large number of monuments have been dispersed across various parts of the city and thus it is necessary to gather them and arrange them in the cemetery."

In 1947 there was a nationwide fundraising effort led by the Citizen's Committee. It aimed to build a new wall and protect the surviving graves. The cemetery was in a dilapidated state and had a huge crater in it from aerial bombing. The campaign was successful and the cemetery received a new wall.

By the beginning of the 1960s all the remaining Jews had left the town and the cemetery was left exposed again. In 1992 ownership was transferred to the City of Oświęcim. In 1998 the site was passed to the ownership of the Jewish community in Bielsko-Biała.

Between 1987 and 1988, Asher Scharf of New York, United States, paid for extensive renovations including a new wall and entrance gates. Matzevot were put back upright and two lapidariums were built from destroyed tombstones. The Sacher family also had their ohel rebuilt. The story of Asher Scharf is told in the 2006, film Saved by Deportation.

== Contemporary cemetery ==
In December 2003, 16 tombstones in the cemetery were knocked over by unknown assailants. A few days previously, two large swastikas were painted on the cemetery wall. These were removed by municipal police.

Since 2014, volunteers from The Matzevah Foundation, Action Reconciliation Service For Peace (ARSP) and local volunteers have repaired several sections of the exterior wall, set the matzevot in 25 concrete stands and installed a gravel path leading to an ohel in the rear of the cemetery. Also since 2014 the cemetery is a listed monument. According to the National Institute of Cultural Heritage and its monuments registry, the cemetery is one of the best-kept and well-restored cemeteries in Małopolska; the preserved tombstones have considerable artistic value and the landscape of high greenery provides a park character.

== Notable burials ==
- Shimson Kleuger
- Jakub Haberfeld

== Tombstone forms ==
Classic flat matzevot made of sandstone are the predominant form at the Jewish cemetery in Oświęcim. Due to the material, these tombstones often delaminate and deteriorate over time. Other forms present in the cemetery are obelisks and small vertical tombstones.

Decorative or symbolic representations related to the symbolism and mysticism of Judaism were often placed on the tombstones. The most common symbols in the Oświęcim cemetery are the motifs of a crown, palm tree and a five-arm candlestick.

=== Matzevot ===
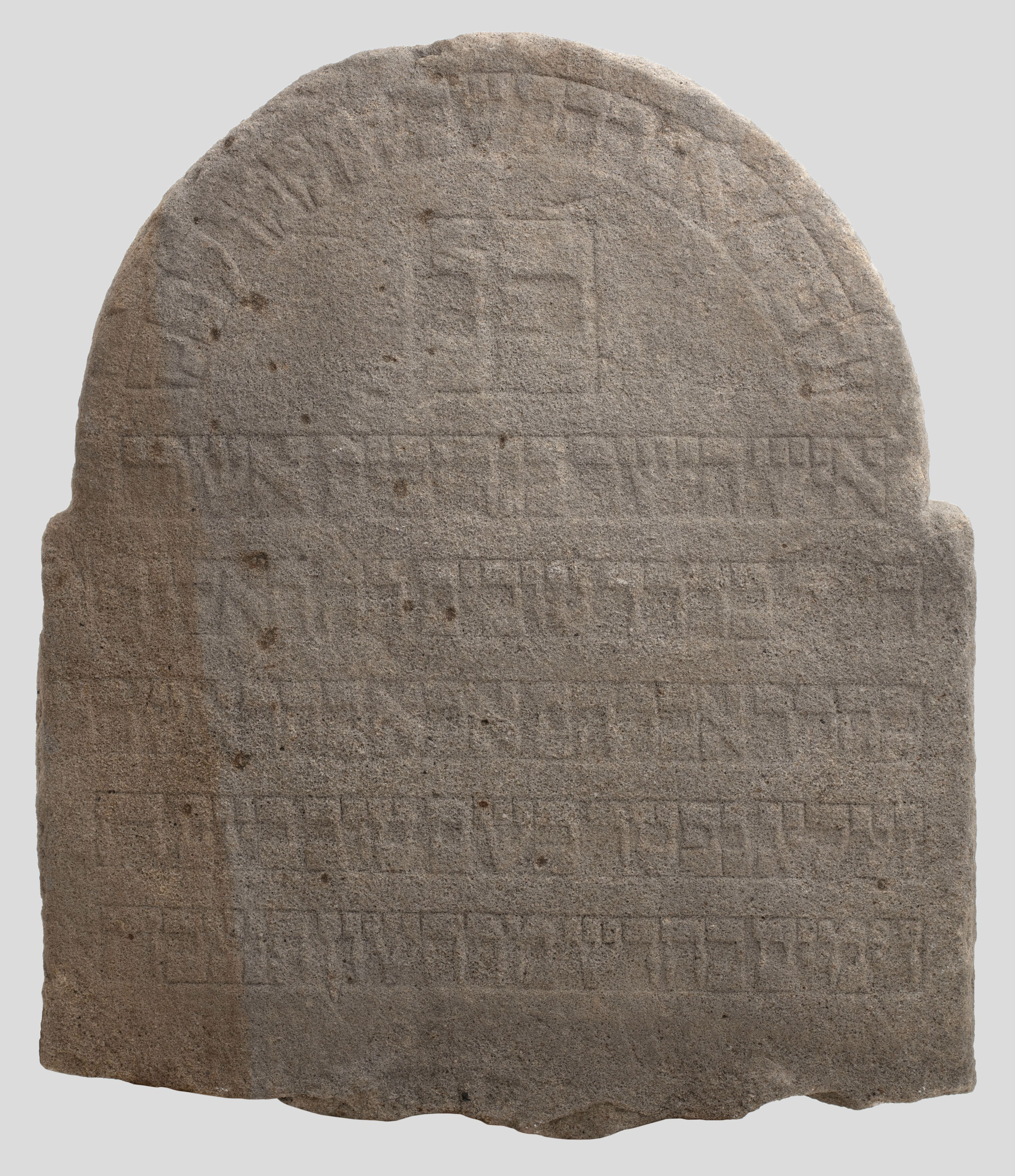
The oldest matzevah found at the cemetery - the gravestone of Abraham Aba

The matzevot in the cemetery have the typical shape of a standing rectangle closed with a semicircular arch, or sometimes closed with a gable. They usually contain decorative, symbolic elements or the initial formula of an inscription. In the case of some tombstones, the text part is separated from the top by a profiled cornice. On the front wall of the matzevah there is an inscription, usually in Hebrew. On several graves of married couples, there are twin matzevot closed with semicircular arches.

The oldest matzevah found in the cemetery was the tombstone of Abraham Aba, who died on October 21, 1757. It has been renovated and is now included in the permanent exhibition of the Auschwitz Jewish Center.

=== Obelisks ===
The obelisk is a monolithic four-sided pole, tapering upwards and truncated at the top, on the pedestal and pedestal. The inscriptions are placed both on the pedestal and in the upper part of the obelisk (where decorative and symbolic elements are also placed). Monuments of this kind were funded by more affluent townspeople (including the Haberfeld family).

=== Steles ===
The form of a stele is made of vertical plates closed with two half-columns and topped with a pediment, most often in the shape of an arch or triangle. Most often there is an inscription board between the half-columns, and symbolic representations on the top.

== Location and visiting ==
The cemetery is kept locked. A key is available for visitors from the Auschwitz Jewish Center in Oświęcim.

== See also ==
- Oświęcim Synagogue
