= Oświęcim Synagogue =

Orthodox synagogue and Jewish museum in Oświęcim, Poland

Oświęcim Synagogue (Chevra Lomdei Mishnayot Synagogue)
- Polish: Synagoga Chewra Lomdei Misznajot w Oświęcimiu
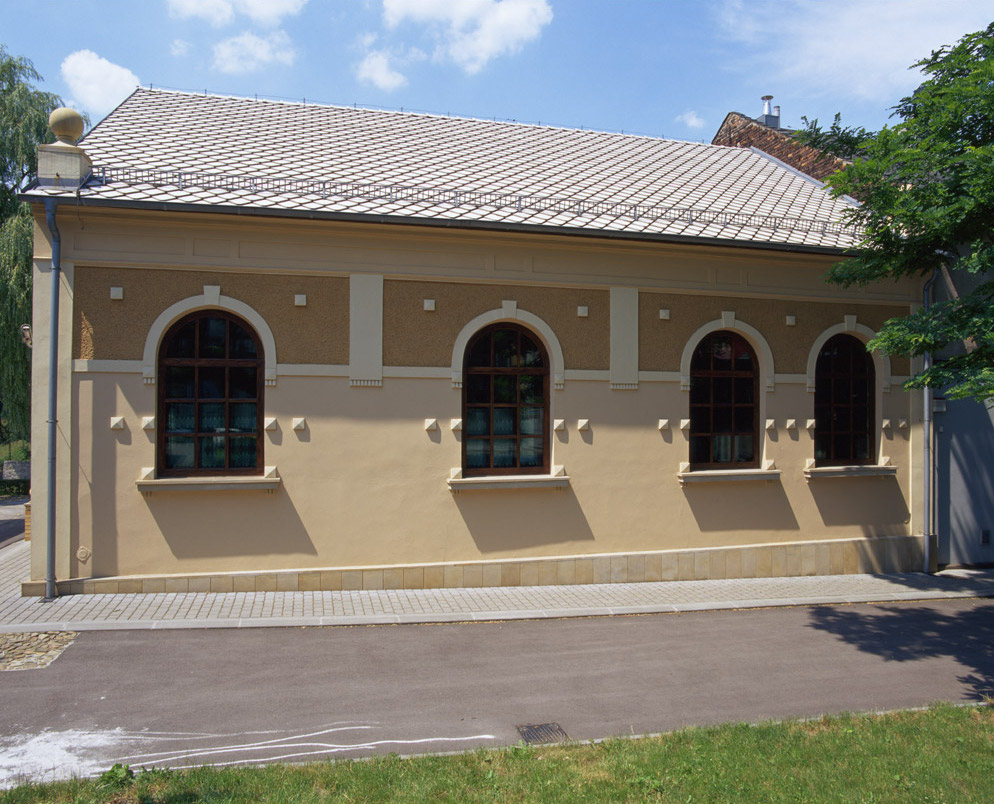
- The synagogue and Jewish museum in 2007

- Location of the synagogue and museum in Lesser Poland Voivodeship

Religion
- Affiliation: Orthodox Judaism
- Rite: Nusach Ashkenaz
- Ecclesiastical or organisational status: Synagogue (since 1918); Profane use (1940–1970s); Jewish museum (since 2000)
- Status: Active

Location
- Location: Plac Księdza Jana Skarbka 5, Oświęcim (German: Auschwitz), Lesser Poland Voivodeship
- Country: Poland
- Coordinates: 50°02′25″N 19°13′13″E

Architecture
- Type: Synagogue architecture
- Groundbreaking: c. 1913
- Completed: 1918
- Materials: Brick

The Oświęcim Synagogue, also called the Auschwitz Synagogue and officially called the Chevra Lomdei Mishnayot Synagogue (Polish: Synagoga Chewra Lomdei Misznajot w Oświęcimiu; English: Association of Those Who Study Mishna), is an Orthodox Jewish congregation and synagogue, located at Plac Księdza Jana Skarbka 5, Oświęcim (German: Auschwitz), in the Lesser Poland Voivodeship of Poland.

Completed in 1918, the synagogue is now part of the Auschwitz Jewish Center, which includes a Jewish museum, a cafe in the house of Shimson Kleuger, and an education center.

== History ==
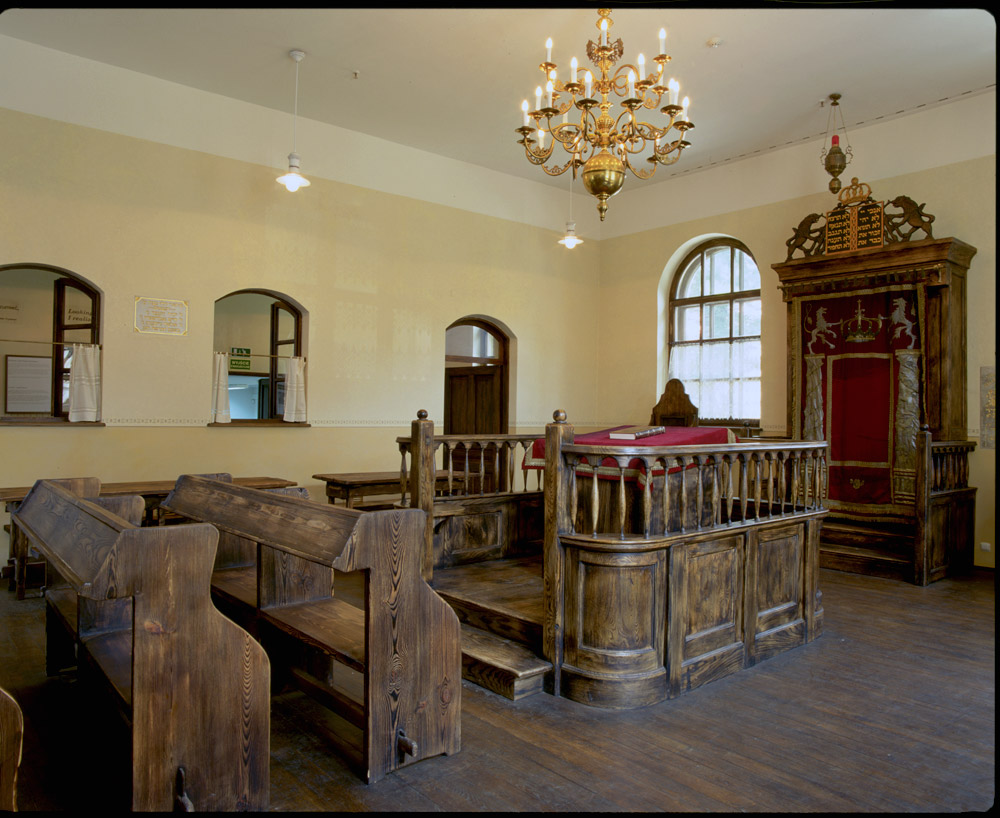
Interior of the synagogue

The synagogue was built between c. 1913 and 1918. During World War II, the Nazis demolished its interior and used the building as a munitions depot. After the war ended, a small group of Jewish survivors restored the synagogue to its proper function. However, the custodians soon left Poland due to the antisemitism of the communist authorities of the 1950s and 1960s; as a result, the synagogue ceased to operate. In the 1970s, under communist Poland, the empty building was used as a carpet warehouse.

The Oświęcim Synagogue was the first building restored to the Jewish community under the Polish government's post-Communism law governing the restitution of Jewish communal property seized by German occupiers during World War II, and retained by the post-war Communist government. The building was claimed by, and is now owned by, the Jewish community of nearby Bielsko-Biała.

The synagogue reopened on 11 September 2000, completely restored to its pre-war condition by the Auschwitz Jewish Center Foundation, at the cost of one million dollars. The temple's interior has been reconstructed. It has once again become an active synagogue used for prayers by groups and individuals visiting Auschwitz.

The adjoining house was purchased by the foundation and turned into a contemporary museum called the Auschwitz Jewish Center (Żydowskie Centrum Edukacyjne). It depicts the life of Jews in pre-war Oświęcim. Both the synagogue and the Jewish center are affiliated with the Museum of Jewish Heritage in New York.

On 12 September 2000 the synagogue was officially opened for religious and educational purposes, the Torah scrolls were brought in, and a mezuzah was nailed down. A museum exhibition devoted to the Jews of Oświęcim has been opened in the former women's gallery. Presently the Synagogue forms a part of the permanent exhibition of the Jewish Museum run by the Auschwitz Jewish Center – a cultural center focused on Jewish heritage, reconciliation through art and intercultural dialogue.

== Shimson Kleuger's house ==
The house of Shimson Kleuger forms part of the complex that includes the synagogue. The house now operates as a cafe. Kleuger, the last native Jew of Oświęcim, died in 2000. His death in 2000 brought to an end the old Jewish community of Oświęcim.

== The Great Synagogue ==
At the time of the Nazi invasion, more than half the population of Oświęcim was Jewish. The community was over 400 years old and there were then more than twenty synagogues in the city. The Auschwitz synagogue was not the most important synagogue in Oświęcim. The better known and bigger Great Synagogue of Oświęcim was destroyed by the Nazis on 29 November 1939 and its remains were demolished.

== See also ==
- Auschwitz Jewish Center
- Chronology of Jewish Polish history
- History of the Jews in Poland
- List of active synagogues in Poland
- Oświęcim Jewish Cemetery
