= Momo.com =

Taiwanese website for online shopping

Momo.com Inc
- Logo used since September 2024

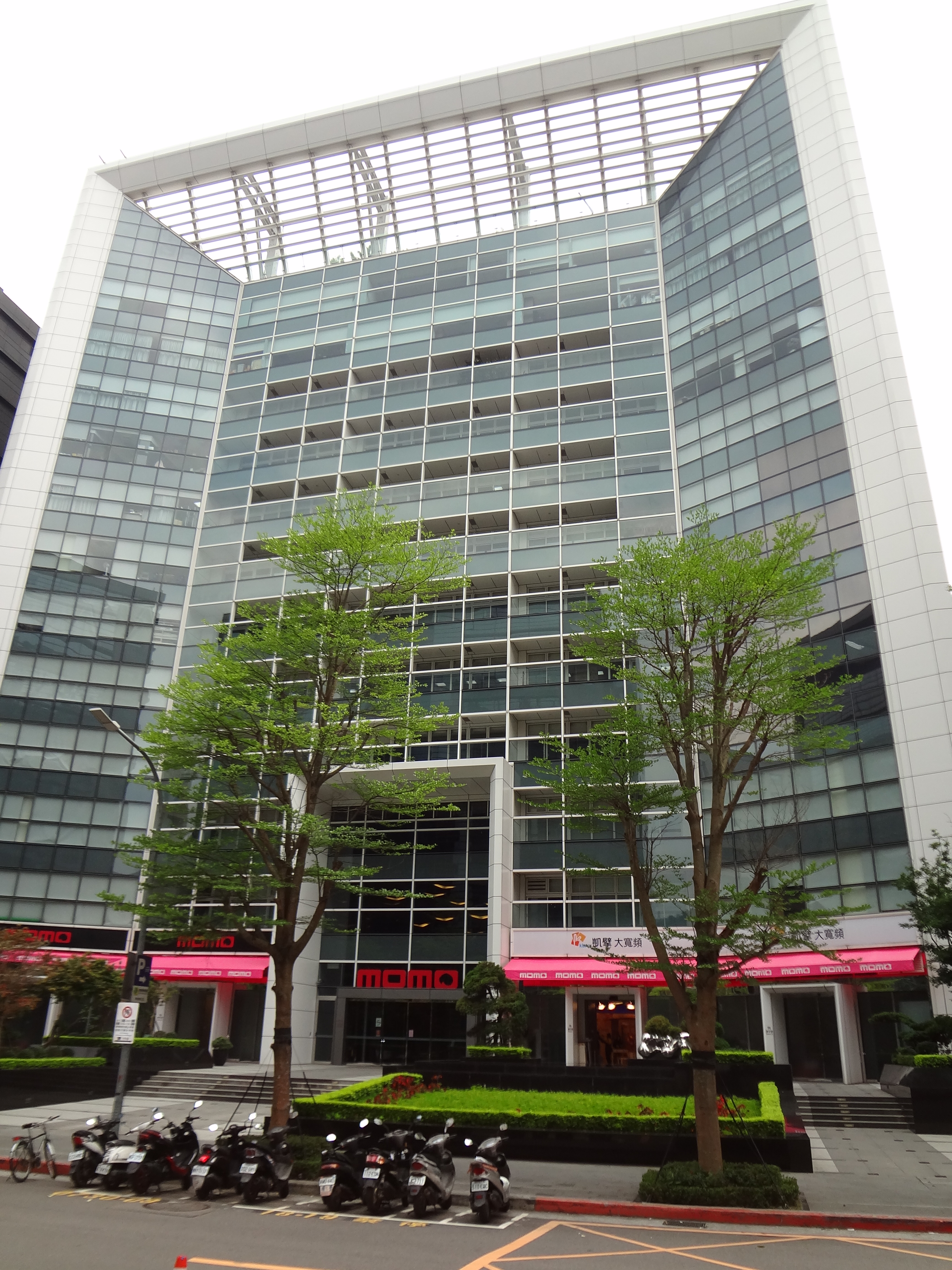
- Momo Headquarters in Neihu Technology Park
- Website type: Direct-to-consumer, E-commerce
- Available in: Chinese
- Owner: Fubon Financial Holding Co.
- Commercial: Yes
- Launched: September 27, 2004
- Current status: Active

Momo.com Inc. (Chinese: 富邦媒體科技), commonly referred to as Fubon Momo, or momo, is a Taiwanese e-commerce and media company founded in September 2004. It is headquartered in Taipei and is owned by Fubon Financial Holding Co.. Its primary institutional shareholder is Taiwan Mobile, a prominent telecom provider. Momo.com Inc operates multiple business channels, including an online shopping platform, a television shopping channel, and a mail-order catalogue, making it the largest direct-to-consumer retailer in Taiwan as of 2024.

Momo launched its television shopping channel in January 2005, broadcasting 24-hour programming to an audience of 5 million households across Taiwan. In May of the same year, it introduced its online shopping platform. Later in 2005, it debuted its mail-order catalogue, which became the most extensive catalogue service in the country. In 2009, Momo became the first Taiwanese virtual retail business to achieve ISO 27001 certification for information security.

== History ==
By 2016, Momo Shopping had become Taiwan's second-largest online retailer, generating NT$20.58 billion in annual revenue, second only to PChome. In 2017, after incorporating revenues from TV shopping and catalog sales, total revenue reached NT$33.24 billion. Momo achieved significant milestones in 2018 with an annual revenue of NT$42.02 billion, a 26.4% increase from the previous year, solidifying its position as Taiwan's largest B2C shopping platform. In 2019, Momo introduced the "Momo Card" to enhance customer loyalty and saw its revenue rise to NT$51.83 billion, a 23.4% year-on-year increase. On 9 November 2023, Momo broke ground for an automated logistics center in Hemei, Changhua County to assist the e-commerce operator in meeting its storage needs for fast delivery. On 20 November 2024, Momo opened its southern distribution center in Sinshih District, Tainan as it continues to strengthen its logistics infrastructure.

== Services and operations ==
Momo Com's operations span multiple retail platforms:

- Momo TV Shopping: a 24-hour television shopping channel
- Momo Online Shopping: Taiwan's largest B2C e-commerce platform, offering a wide range of products, from electronics to household items
- Momo Mail-Order Catalog: a nationwide catalog service featuring curated products for diverse consumer needs
