= Melamed =

Religious teacher in Jewish communities

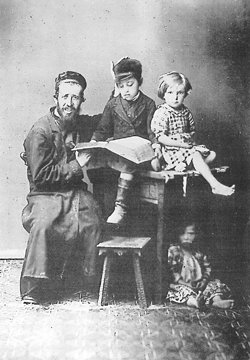
A Jewish father teaching a child in 19th-century Podolia.

Melamed, Melammed (Hebrew: מלמד, romanized: məlammeḏ "teacher") in Biblical times denoted a religious teacher or instructor in general (e.g., in Psalm 119:99 and Proverbs 5:13), but which in the Talmudic period was applied especially to a teacher of children, and was almost invariably followed by the word tinokot (Hebrew: תינוקות, romanized: tinoqoṯ "children"). The Aramaic equivalent was Jewish Babylonian Aramaic: מקרי דרדקי, romanized: maqrē dardaqē.

The melamed was appointed by the community, and there were special regulations determining how many children he might teach, as well as rules governing the choice of applicants for the office and the dismissal of a melamed. These regulations were extended and augmented in the post-Talmudic period.

== Regulations ==
Besides the teachers appointed by the community, there were others who were privately engaged by the parents of children; hence it became necessary to define accurately the mutual rights and duties of the melamed and of the parents.

While giving instruction, the melamed was not allowed to do any other work. If he was ill, and therefore unable to teach for a time, as much was deducted from his wages as the lessons for that time would have cost; but if, on the other hand, the pupil was ill and could not take his lessons, the melamed received full payment.

The melamed was not allowed to punish his pupils too severely; and he had to teach both in the daytime and during part of the night. He might not leave his pupils alone, nor neglect his duties; and he was required to be pious and to understand his vocation. Only a married man might be a melamed. In addition to these regulations, many others concerning the melamed are given in Yoreh De'ah, as well as in Hoshen Mishpat, but some of them are not observed at present.

The salary for a melamed was low, more often than not. Many melameds lived a very poor life.

== Types of tutors ==
A distinction was made between the village melamed, who was engaged as a private tutor by a Jew living in a village, and one who teaches the child in the house of its parents, and the melamed in a town, who teaches in his own home, which serves at the same time as a schoolroom (see cheder).

A distinction is likewise drawn between the "melamed tinoqot" and the "melamed gemara." The former would teach children of both genders to read and write Hebrew, and also a chapter or two of each weekly lesson from the Torah, and he generally has one or more assistants (Yiddish: בעלפֿער, romanized: belfer). The gemara melamed, on the other hand, teaches Bible and Talmud to the boys, and, when they are older, the Shulchan Aruch as well.

== Use of the term ==
Among East European Jews, the word "melamed" is synonymous with respected and "rov," and the Yiddish term rebe is often used to mean a melamed as well as a Hasidic rebbe. Among the Karaites, the term denotes, like "rav" among the Rabbinites, "teacher" and "master," and is regarded as a title of honor. Consequently, there are among the Karaites many learned men who are called by the title "ha-melammed ha-gadol" (the great master), or merely "ha-melammed" (the master; comp. Pinsker, "Liḳḳute Ḳadmoniyyot", Index; Gottlober, "Biḳḳoret le-Toledot ha-Ḳara'im", pp. 195, 207, Wilna, 1865).

== See also ==
- Jewish education
- Cheder

== Jewish Encyclopedia bibliography ==
- Isaac Lampronti, Paḥad Yiṣḥaq, s.v., in addition to the authorities cited in the article
