= Home shopping =

Shopping from home

Home shopping is the electronic retailing and home shopping channels industry, which includes such billion dollar television-based and e-commerce companies as Shop LC, HSN, Gemporia, TJC, QVC, eBay, ShopHQ, Rakuten.com and Amazon.com, as well as traditional mail order and brick and mortar retailers as Hammacher Schlemmer and Sears. Home shopping allows consumers to shop for goods from the privacy of their own home, as opposed to traditional shopping, which requires one to visit brick and mortar stores and shopping malls.

There are three main types of home shopping: mail or telephone ordering from catalogs; telephone ordering in response to advertisements in print and electronic media (such as periodicals, TV shopping channels and radio); and online shopping. The study shows that home shopping are continuously preferred by the customers especially for those teleworkers and busy working class.

== History ==
The possibility for merchants to show their goods through the world was the first usage of the "electroscope" (some kind of television apparatus) imagined by the author of the hoax published in the New York Sun, 30 March 1877. The first such attempt at broadcasting shopping news occurred on February 1, 1927 with the establishment of WASN radio in Boston; owned by John Shepard III, WASN boasted reports from fifteen different department stores in Greater Boston every two hours, mixed with pre-recorded and live orchestra music. Due to technical issues, the format was dropped after five months, and the station eventually merged operations into co-owned WNAC, today known as WBIX. The first experiments at broadcasting home shopping on television occurred in the UK as early as 1934.

The home shopping/electronic retailing industry was created in 1977, when small market talk radio host Bob Circosta was asked to sell avocado–green-colored can openers live on the air by station owner Bud Paxson, when an advertiser traded 112 units of product instead of paying his advertising bill. Hesitant at first, Circosta reluctantly obliged – and to both men's great surprise, all 112 can openers sold out within the hour. Paxson sensed the vast sales potential of home-based commerce, and founded the world's first shopping channel on cable television, later launching nationwide with the Home Shopping Network (rebranded as HSN). Bob Circosta was America's first-ever TV home shopping host, becoming one of the most instantly recognizable salesmen in the United States. Over the next three decades, Circosta sold over 75,000 different products on HSN, netted over 20,000 hours of live, on-air TV selling, and achieved personal product sales in excess of one billion dollars. (The story is disputed; there is some record of Paxson having unsuccessfully tried a similar format in 1969 on one of his earlier TV stations, WNYP in Jamestown, New York.)

The television-based home shopping industry quickly became a player in the retail industry, and the shopping channels – HSN and QVC – generated a combined total of over 10 billion dollars in sales per year. Additionally, Jewelry Television was the largest gemstone retailer in the world at that time.

Amazon.com began as an online bookstore in 1994, created by Wall Street computer scientist Jeff Bezos. In addition to books, Amazon eventually added video games, software, electronics, clothing, and more to its sales repertoire. The company now generates over 200 billion dollars annually.

In Europe, more than 150 home shopping channels were identified in activity in February 2018 by the European Audiovisual Observatory.

== Direct response ==
Direct-response marketing is often considered to be a part of the home shopping/electronic retailing industry. The Electronic Retailing Association, when totaling the combined revenues from all the home shopping companies, estimates that in 2005, the industry generated over 320 billion dollars. Direct marketing is a marketing where buyers will give direct response to the sellers and seller will immediately take an order.
