= Bobbi Ray Carter =

American television personality

Bobbi Ray Carter is a long-time home shopping host on HSN. Formerly nicknamed Bubblin' Bobbi Ray, her gregarious personality has rendered her one of the network's most popular hosts. She is primarily associated with fashion and beauty products and celebrated 40 years on the Home Shopping Network (HSN) in August, 2023. She is married to Jerry Carter and has one daughter from a prior marriage.

Prior to joining HSN, she performed with the Rockettes, on tour in Europe.
