= Tallit =

Jewish prayer shawl

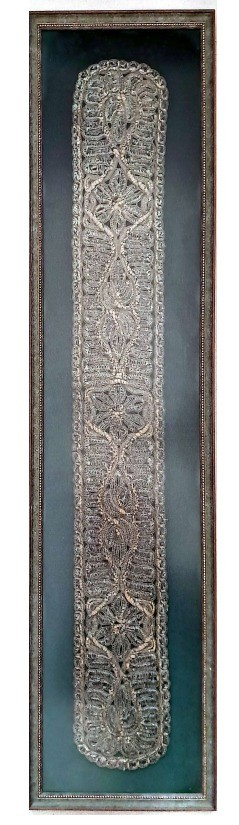

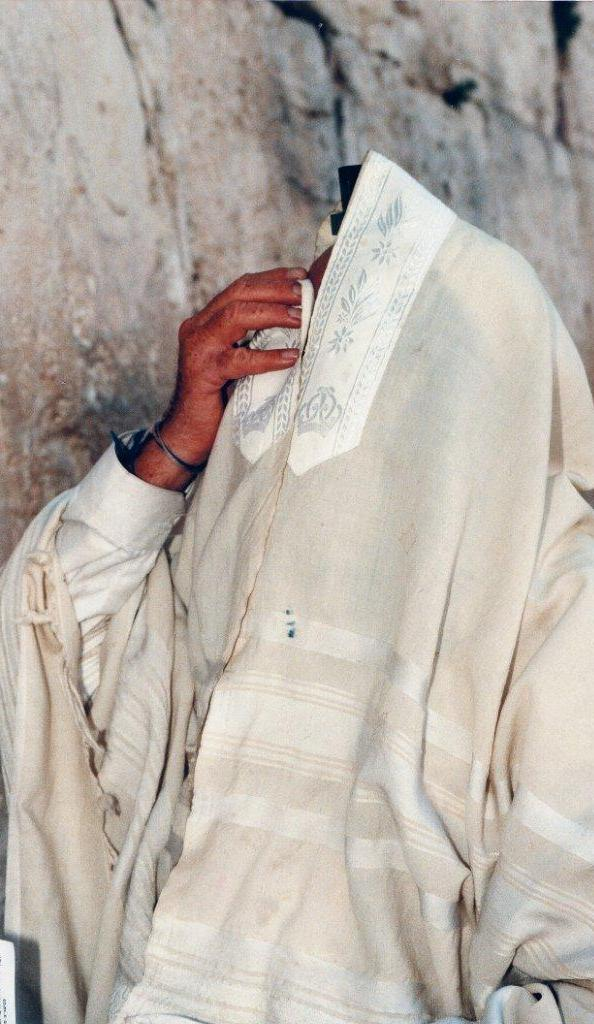
A white wool tallit, following one Sephardic custom

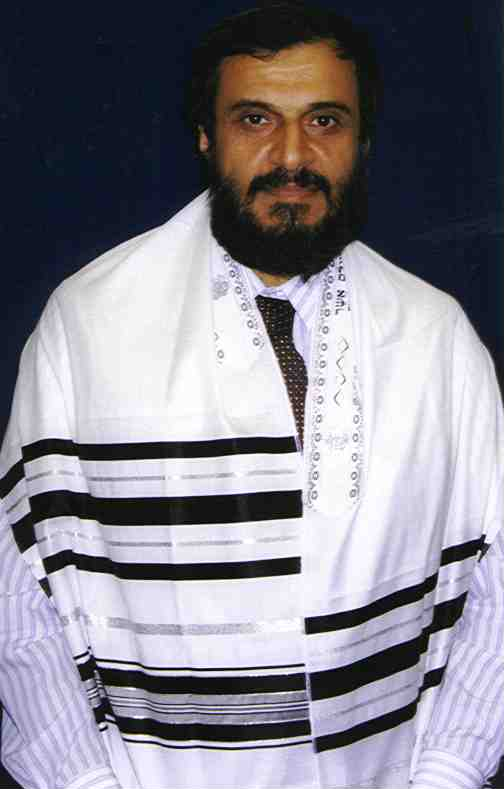
A rayon tallit with black stripes, in the style popular among Conservative Jews.

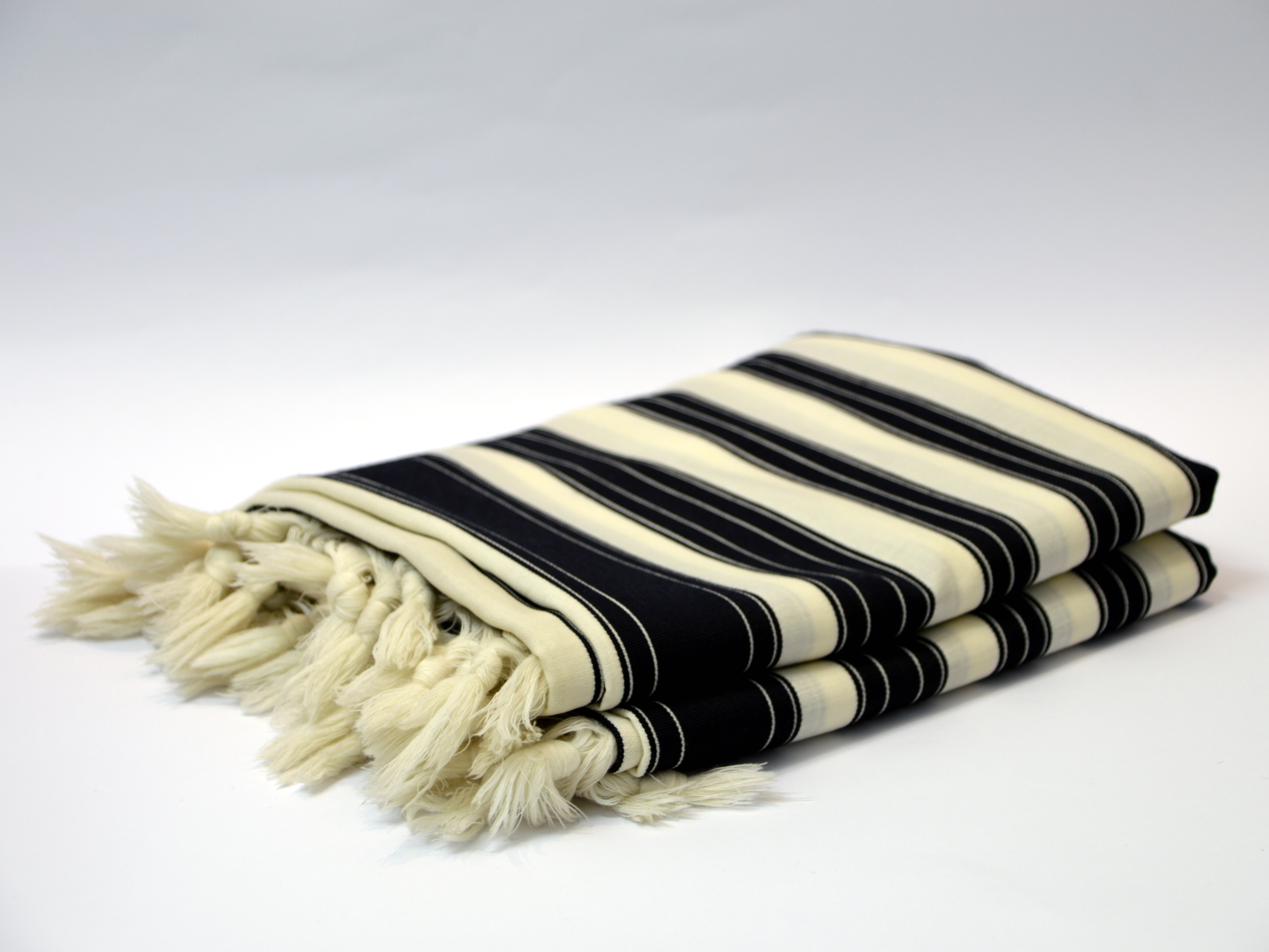
A folded tallit with the Chabad pattern

A tallit, (Note: Hebrew: טַלִּית, romanized: ṭalliṯ [taˈlit]; ṭālēt in Sephardic Hebrew and Ladino; tallis in Ashkenazi Hebrew and Yiddish. Mishnaic Hebrew plural טליות ṭəllāyoṯ, otherwise טליתות țalliṯoṯ; Yiddish pl. טליתים taleysem.) taleth, or tallis is a fringed garment worn as a prayer shawl by religious Jews. The tallit has special twined and knotted fringes known as tzitzit attached to its four corners. The cloth part is known as the beged ("garment") and is usually made from wool or cotton, although silk is sometimes used for a tallit gadol.

The term is, to an extent, ambiguous. It can refer either to the tallit katan, ("small tallit") item worn over or under clothing (commonly referred to as "tzitzit"), or to the tallit gadol, ("big tallit") worn over the outer clothes during Shacharit and all of the Yom Kippur prayer services. The term "tallit" alone typically refers to the tallit gadol.

There are diverse traditions regarding the age at which a tallit gadol is first used, including within Orthodox Judaism. In some Sephardic Orthodox communities, young boys wear a tallit even before becoming b'nei mitzvah. In some communities, it is worn beginning with a boy's bar mitzvah, though the tallit katan is often worn from preschool age. In many Orthodox Ashkenazi Jewish communities, a tallit gadol is worn only after marriage and may be given to a groom as a wedding present or, in the most conservative communities, as part of a dowry.

== Biblical commandment ==
The Hebrew Bible does not command wearing a prayer shawl. Instead, it presumes that people wore a garment of some type to cover themselves and instructs the Israelites to attach fringes (ציצית tzitzit) to the corners of these in Numbers 15:38, which is repeated in Deuteronomy 22:12: "You shall make tassels on the four corners of the garment with which you cover yourself." These passages do not specify tying particular types or numbers of knots in the fringes.

Customs regarding the tying of the tzitzit and the format of the tallit are of Rabbinic origin and, though the Talmud discusses these matters, slightly different traditions have developed in different communities. However the Bible is specific as to the purpose of these tzitzit, stating that "it shall be unto you for a fringe, that ye may look upon it, and remember all the commandments of the LORD, and do them; and that ye go not about after your own heart and your own eyes, after which ye use to go astray; that ye may remember and do all My commandments, and be holy unto your God".

The Encyclopaedia Judaica describes the prayer shawl as "a rectangular mantle that looked like a blanket and was worn by men in ancient times". Also, it "is usually white and made either of wool, cotton, or silk".

Traditionally, a tallit is made of wool or linen, based on an understanding that reference to a "garment" in the Bible in connection with a mitzvah refers to wool and linen garments. Though other materials are sometimes used, the debate has not reached a conclusion, and many, especially among the orthodox, prefer wool, which is accepted by all authorities. There is also debate about mixed wool and linen tallit, since the Bible forbids kelayim (shatnez)—"intertying" wool and linen together, with the two exceptions being the garments of the priests of the Temple and the tzitzit. Concerning tzitzit, chazal (the sages) permit using wool and linen strings in tandem only when genuine tekhelet (see below) is available, whereas kabbalist sources take it a step further by encouraging its practice.

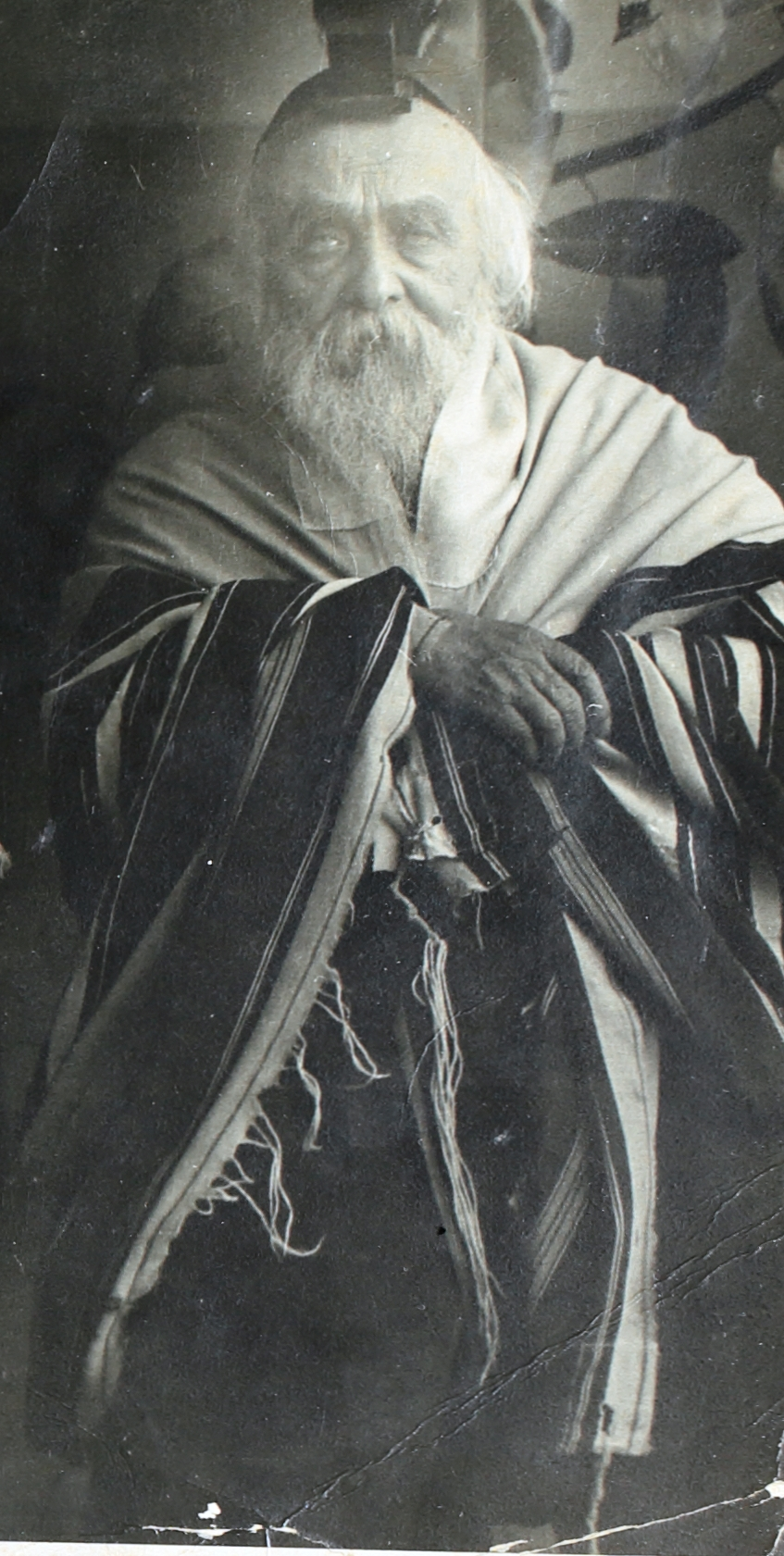
Chaim Moshe Zilbershitz seen with his Ashkenazic tallit

According to the biblical commandment in Numbers 15:38, a "tekhelet" thread is included in the tzitzit. (The colour of the tekhelet dye varies from blue to purple and red, although blue is the colour specifically associated with it in Judaism.) However, for many centuries since the Jewish diaspora, tzitzit have been worn without a tekhelet fringe, though there has been something of a comeback in the last hundred years.

== Pronunciation ==
In Modern Hebrew the word is pronounced [taˈlit], with the stress on the final syllable. In Yiddish it is [ˈtalɛs], with the stress on the first syllable. The plural of tallit in Hebrew is tallitot, pronounced [taliˈtot]. The Yiddish plural is taleysem, pronounced [taˈlejsɛm].

== Etymology ==
Mishnaic Hebrew טלית is a backformation of אצטלית eṣṭolēt (also attested with the spelling אסטלית in Mishanic Hebrew, for instance Mishnah Yoma 7:1), borrowed from Koine Greek: στολή, romanized: stolē with a prosthetic -א to break up with initial consonant cluster and a suffix ת- because final -ē was not tolerated in Mishnaic Hebrew. It is the vocalization טָלֵית which is reflected in the Yiddish and Ladino spoken traditions.

The spelling of this word motivated a folk etymology in Modern Hebrew. טלית has been re-vocalized as though it were from the root ṭ-l-l (ט־ל־ל) meaning "cover", with the diminutive suffix -it.

טלית referred to a "cloak" or "sheet" generally (as Greek στολή), but in Talmudic times already referred to the Jewish prayer shawl in particular.

== Idiom ==
In modern Hebrew idiom, the expression "a completely blue tallit" (טלית שכולה תכלת) means something which is completely perfect, and is typically used sarcastically to refer to a person who is imperfect and hypocritical. The expression stems from a rabbinic story about the biblical figure Qoraḥ, who led a revolt against the leadership of Moses and Aaron. Koraḥ was said to have asked Moses a number of vexatious questions, one of which was, "Does a tallit made entirely of blue yarn require tzitzit?" To Moses's affirmative answer, Qoraḥ argued that the tzitzit commandment is absurd, in that if a single string of blue makes a garment acceptable (Numbers 15:38) then a completely blue garment should be acceptable even without that string. Qoraḥ's argument in this story is a metaphor for the argument justifying his rebellion. Just as he argued that a blue fringe is superfluous for an entirely blue garment, in the text of the Torah he argued that a holy leader like Moses was unnecessary for a nation which was entirely holy (Numbers 16:3).

The phrase "more kosher than tzitzit" is a Yiddish metaphoric expression (כשר'ער ווי ציצית) with similar connotations but is not necessarily used in a sarcastic sense. It can refer, in the superlative, to something that is really so perfect and flawless as to be beyond all reproach or criticism.

== Customs ==
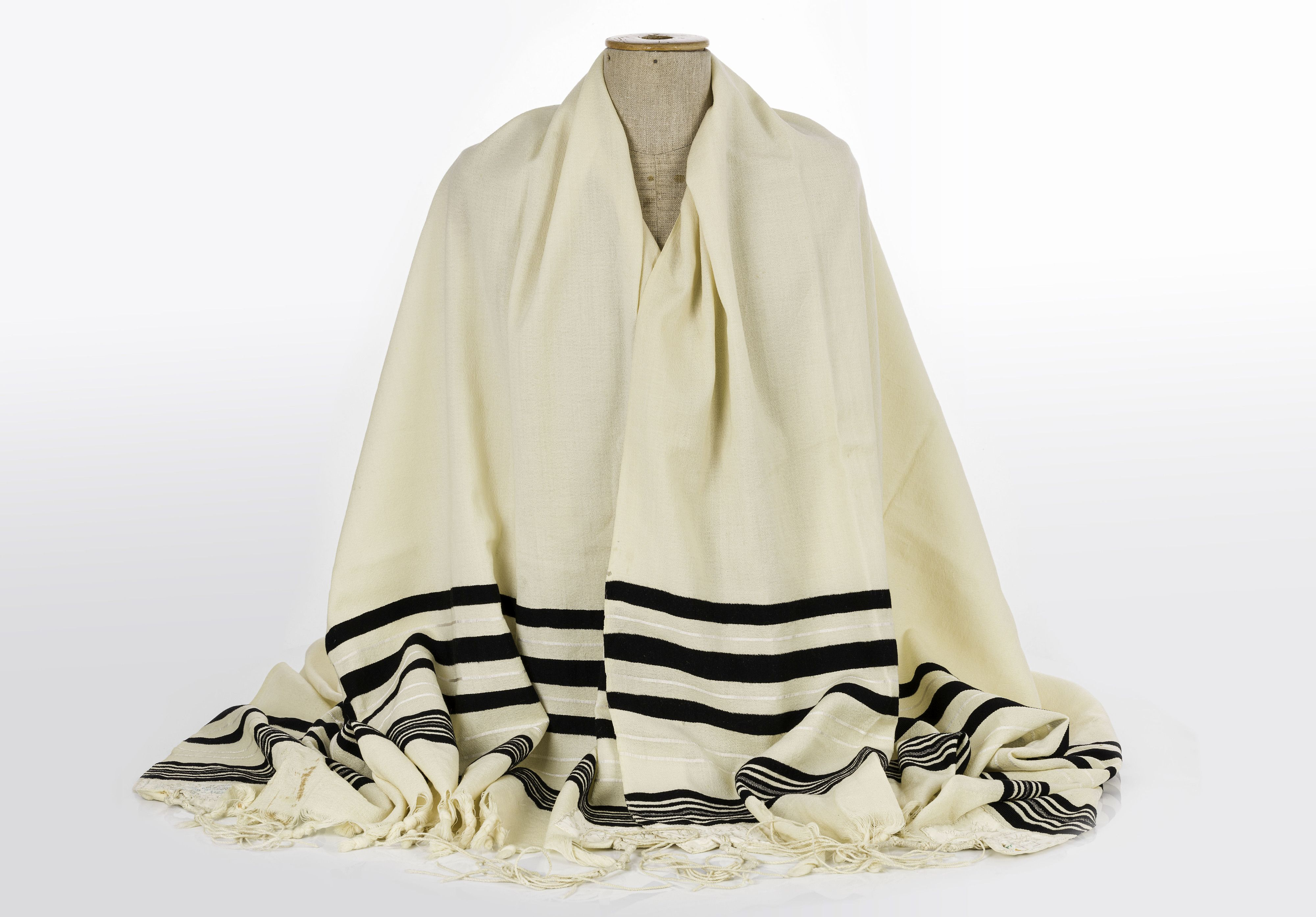
Tallit found at the House of Shimson Kleuger, Oświęcim

In some Jewish communities a tallit gadol is given as a gift by a father to a son, a father-in-law to a son-in-law, or a teacher to a student. Many families pass tallitot down as heirlooms. It might be purchased to mark a special occasion, such as a wedding or a bar mitzvah. Many parents purchase a tallit gadol for their sons at the age of 13, together with tefillin, though among the orthodox a male child will have been wearing a tallit katan from pre-school age. In the Reform, Reconstructionist, Renewal, and Conservative movements many women nowadays also wear a tallit gadol. While many worshipers bring their own tallit gadol to synagogue, there is usually a rack of them for the use of visitors and guests.

At Jewish wedding ceremonies, a tallit gadol is often used as a chuppah or wedding canopy. Similarly, a tallit gadol is traditionally spread out as a canopy over the children during the Torah-reading ceremony during the holiday of Simchat Torah, or in any procession with Torah scrolls, such as when parading a newly completed scroll through the streets.

The tallit gadol is traditionally draped over the shoulders, but during prayer, some cover their head with it, notably during specific parts of the service such as the Amidah and when called to the Torah for an aliyah.

In the Talmudic and post-Talmudic periods the tefillin were worn by rabbis and scholars all day, and a special tallit was worn at prayer; hence they put on the tefillin before the tallit, as appears in the order given in "Seder Rabbi Amram Gaon" (p. 2a) and in the Zohar. In modern practice, the opposite order is considered more "correct". Based on the Talmudic principle of tadir v'she'ayno tadir, tadir kodem (תדיר ושאינו תדיר, תדיר קודם: lit., frequent and infrequent, frequent first), when one performs more than one mitzva at a time, those that are performed more frequently should be performed first. While the tallit is worn daily, tefillin are not worn on Shabbat and holidays.

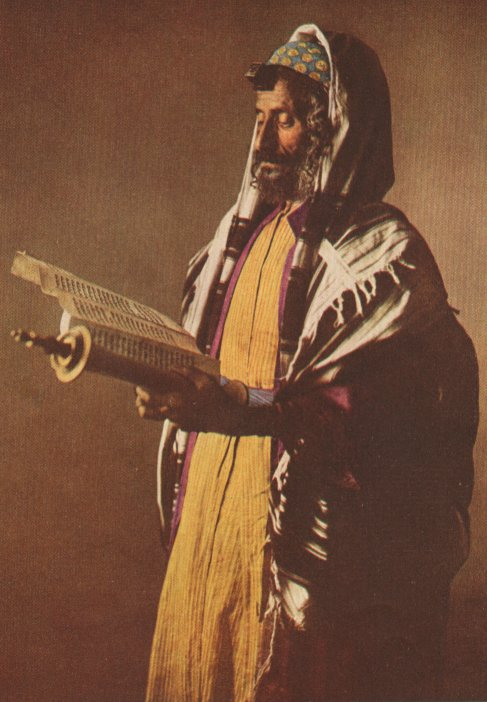
Yemenite Jew wearing tallit

On the fast day of Tisha B'Av, different customs prevail. Ashkenazim and some Sephardim do not wear a tallit gadol during the morning (Shacharit) service; at the afternoon service (Mincha), those who wear a tallit gadol make the blessing on fringes then. Other Sephardim (following the Kabbalah and the prevailing custom (Minhag) for Jerusalem) wear the tallit at Shacharit as usual.

The Kabbalists considered the tallit as a special garment for the service of God, intended, in connection with the tefillin, to inspire awe and reverence for God at prayer.

The tallit gadol is worn by worshipers at the morning prayer on weekdays, Shabbat, and holy days. In addition, in many communities, it is worn by the hazzan (cantor) at every prayer while before the ark and by the reader of Torah, as well as by all other functionaries during the Torah reading.

=== History ===
The literal commandment in the Bible was not to wear a tallit but to attach tzitzit to the corners of one's four-cornered garments every day to serve as a reminder of God commandments; this implies that such clothes were typically worn by Jews during biblical times. Such garments were large, white and rectangular and used as a garment, shawl and burial shroud. These four-cornered garments are suitable for the climate of West Asia. On hot days the garment could be draped around the body and head to provide cover from the sun or just bunched up on the shoulders for later evening use; the evenings can be dramatically cool and the garment could be draped around the neck and shoulders like a scarf to provide warmth.

Jews became at risk of losing this mitzvah when four cornered garments went out of fashion and became impractical for everyday wear. And so, a poncho-like vest undergarment was developed as a practical solution to continue following the Torah commandment. This garment is most commonly known as tzitzit, but is also referred to as arba kanfot ("four corners"), or tallit katan ("small tallit"). Jewish men wear the talit katan every day, most commonly worn under their clothing with the tzitzit knots hanging out. Some Jewish men prefer to tuck in their tzitzit to avoid drawing unwanted attention and/or for practical reasons. The tallit gadol became almost exclusively worn only for morning prayers and rarely outside.

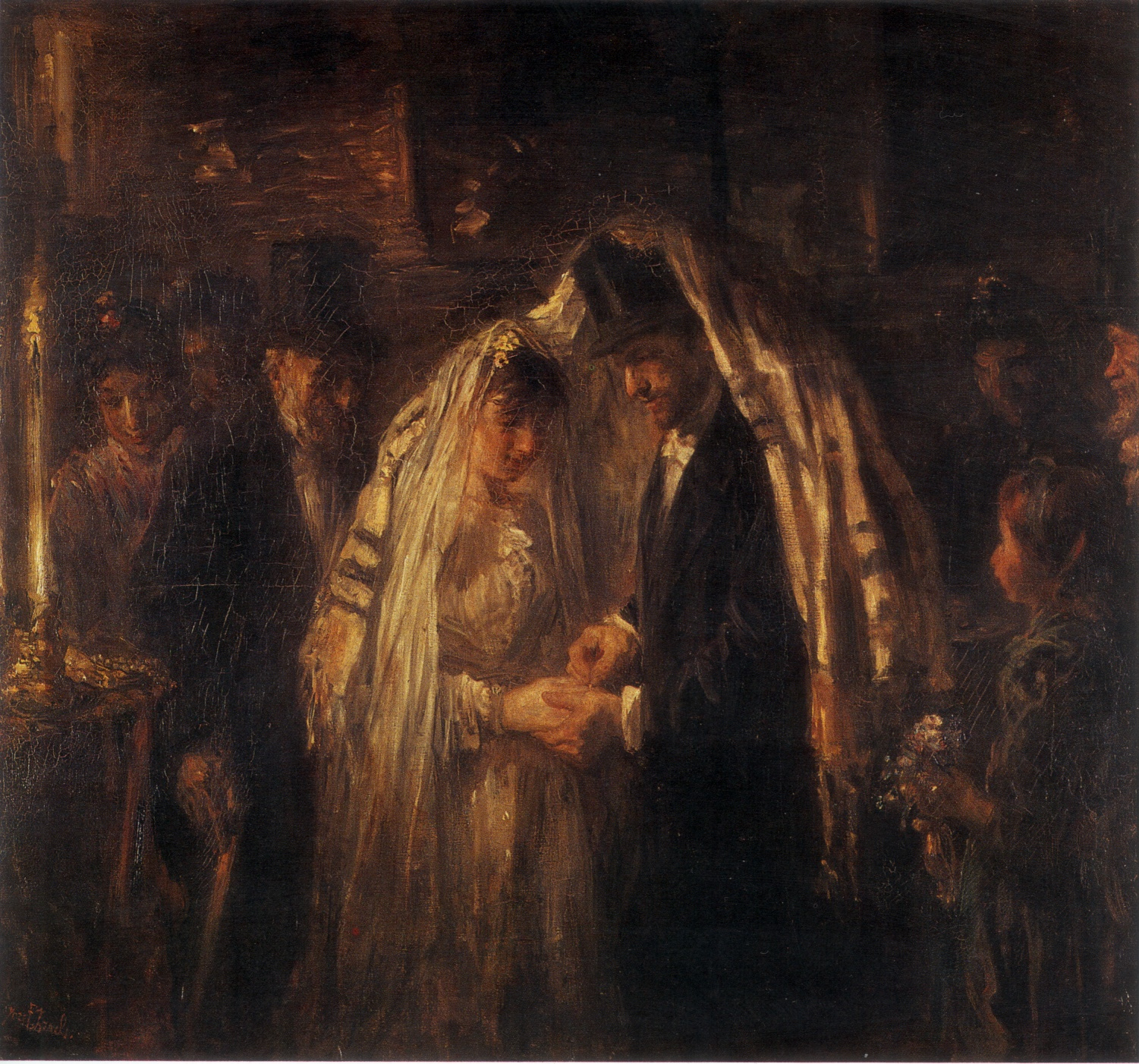
A Jewish newlywed couple endowed with tallit

=== Weddings ===
In many Sephardic and German Jewish communities, the groom traditionally wears a tallit gadol under the chuppah (wedding canopy); in many cases, he will wrap it around the bride as well during the ceremony. In non-German Ashkenazi communities, a more widespread custom is that the groom wears a kittel. In Hasidic and some non-Hasidic communities, an overcoat is worn over the kittel.

=== Burials ===
In the Diaspora, Jews are buried in a plain, wooden casket. The corpse is collected from the place of death (home, hospital, etc.) by the chevra kadisha (burial committee). In Ashkenazi custom, after a ritual washing of the body, the body of men is dressed in a kittel and then a tallit gadol. One of the tzitzit is then cut off. In the Land of Israel, burial is without a casket, and the kittel and tallit are the only coverings for the corpse. Women are buried in white shrouds only.

=== Additional occasions ===
In addition to the morning prayers of weekdays, Shabbat and holidays, a tallit gadol is also worn for Selichos in Ashkenazic communities by the prayer leader, even though it is still night. A tallit is also worn at night on Yom Kippur, from Kol Nidre, which begins during the daylight hours until after the evening (Ma'ariv) service.

== Types of tallitot ==
=== Tallit katan ===
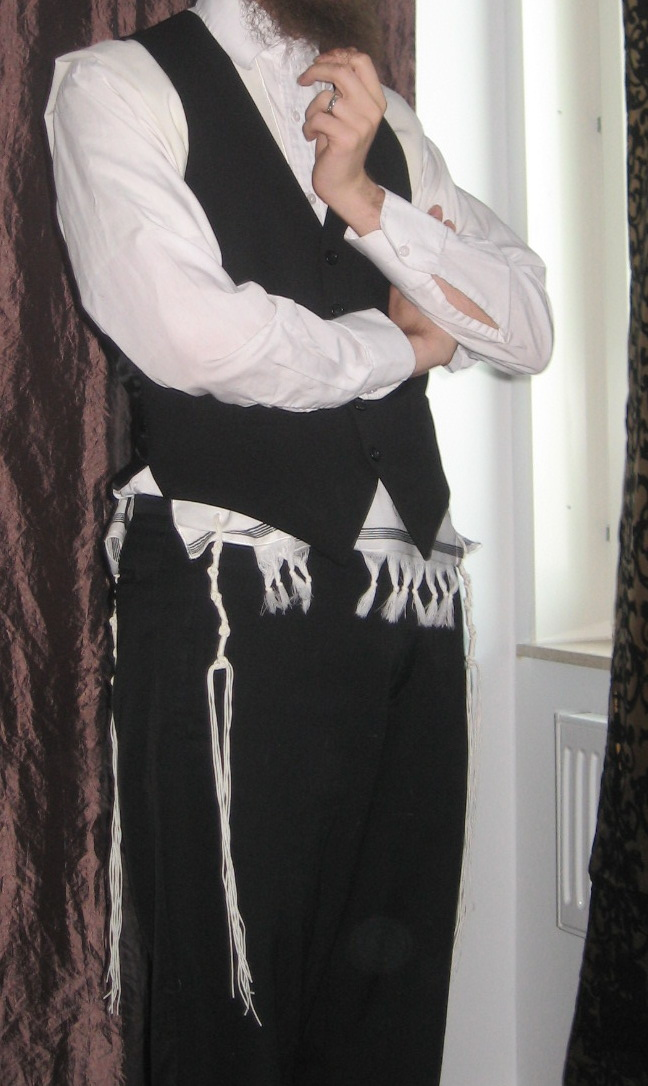
An Orthodox Jewish man wearing a wool tallit katan under his vest/waistcoat

The tallit katan (Yiddish/Ashkenazic Hebrew tales kotn; "small tallit") is a fringed garment traditionally worn either under or over one's clothing by Jewish males. It is a poncho-like garment with a hole for the head and special twined and knotted fringes known as tzitzit attached to its four corners. The requirements regarding the fabric and fringes of a tallit katan are the same as that of a tallit gadol. Generally, a tallit katan is made of wool or cotton.

Although Sephardic halakha generally maintains a distinct preference for a woolen garment as per the ruling of the Shulchan Aruch, among Ashkenazim customs are split, with Moses Isserles ruling that all garment types are acceptable. While the Mishnah Berurah and Moshe Feinstein recommend wearing a woolen garment following the Shulchan Aruch's ruling, Avrohom Yeshaya Karelitz was known to wear cotton, following the ruling of the Vilna Gaon. This was also the practice of Joseph B. Soloveitchik and that of German Jewry historically.

While all four cornered garments are required to have tzitzit, the custom of specially wearing a tallit katan is based on a verse in Numbers 15:38-39 which tells Moses to exhort the Israelites to "make them throughout their generations fringes in the corners of their garments." Wearing a tallit kattan is not mandated in Biblical law, but in Rabbinic law the practice is strongly encouraged for men, and often considered obligatory or a binding custom.

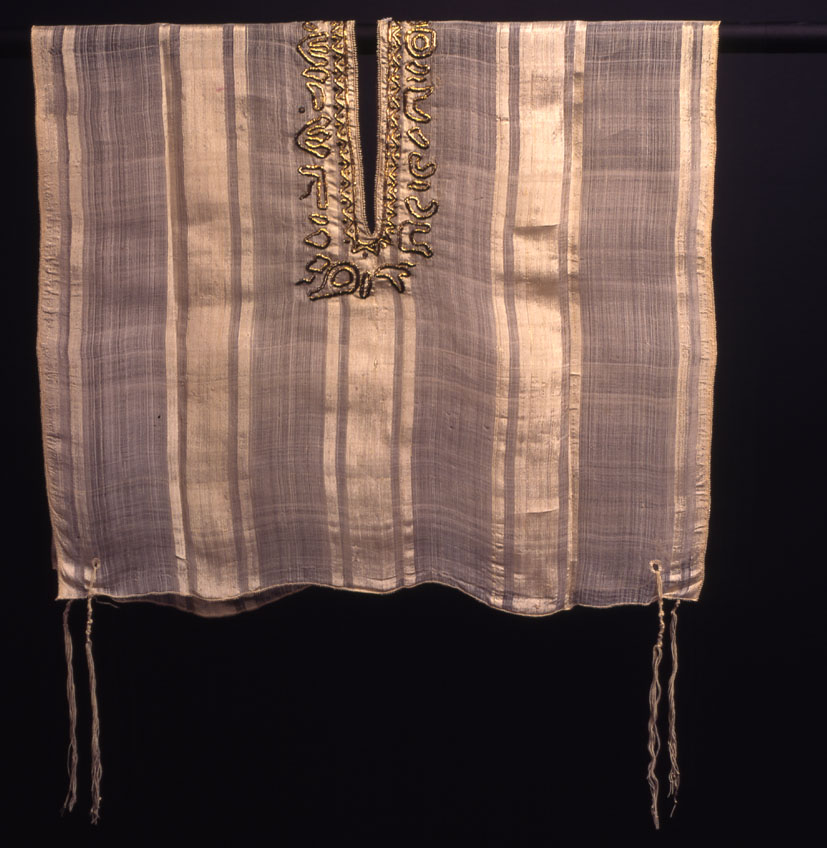
Early 19th-century tallit katan from Gallipoli, Turkey

The tallit katan is also known as arba kanfot (Yiddish/Ashkenazic Hebrew: arbe kanfes), literally "four corners", and may be referred to simply as tzitzit.

A continuing misconception within non-Jewish circles is that the tallit katan is a sheet which is used by Orthodox Jews during sexual intercourse. It is believed that the fabric being hung from clothing lines during the 19th and 20th centuries within Jewish neighborhoods in the United States started these rumors. Not understanding its purpose, seeing the material with a hole in the middle caused non-Jews to make imaginative assumptions.

=== Tallit gadol ===
The tallit gadol (Yiddish/Ashkenazic Hebrew tallis godoil; traditionally known as tallét gedolah among Sephardim), or "large" tallit, is worn over one's clothing resting on the shoulders. This is the prayer shawl that is worn during the morning services in synagogue by all male participants, and in many communities by the leader of the afternoon and evening prayers as well.

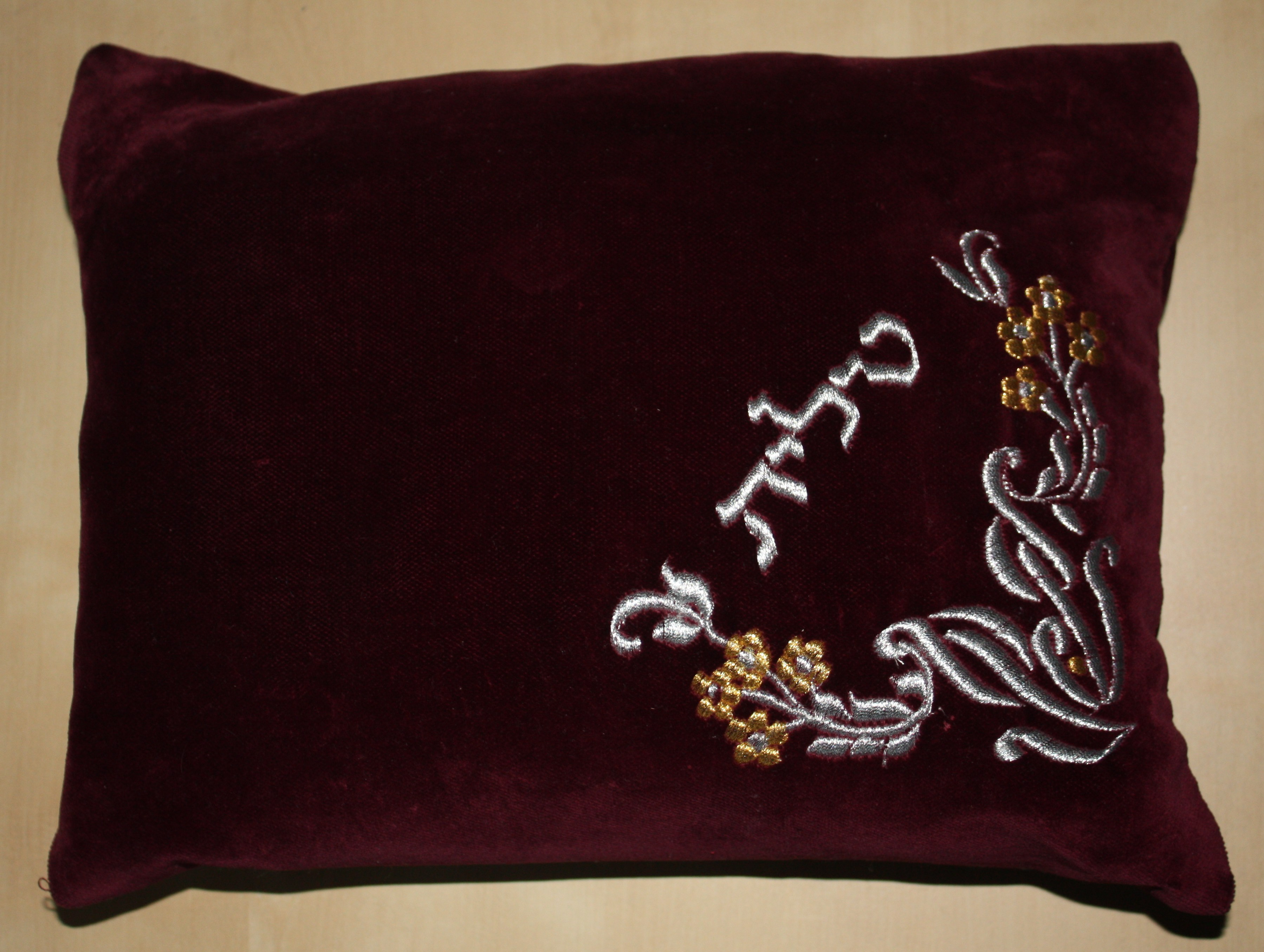
A typical tallit bag. The Hebrew embroidery says tallit. Frequently the owner will add additional embroidery with their name.

The tallit gadol is usually woven of wool—especially among Ashkenazim. Some Spanish, Portuguese and Italian Jews use silk tallitot. The Portuguese Jewish community in The Netherlands has the tradition of decorating the corners of the Tallit. From the 1940s onward, some less expensive tallitot have been made of various synthetic fibers like rayon, nylon, and polyester. Tallitot may be of any colour but are usually white with black, blue or white stripes along the edge. Sizes of tallitot vary, and are a matter of custom and preference. Some are large enough to cover the whole body while others hang around the shoulders, the former being more common among Orthodox Jews, the latter among Conservative, Reform and other denominations. The neckband of the tallit, sometimes woven of silver or gold thread, is called the atarah which literally means crown but is often referred to as the collar. The tallit gadol is often kept in a dedicated pouch or cloth bag (often of velvet) which can be quite simple or ornately decorated.

The tallit gadol is typically either all white, white with black stripes, or white with blue stripes. The all-white and black-and-white varieties have traditionally been the most common, along with a blue-and-white variety, said to be in remembrance of the blue thread or tekhelet. Historically, the strong, long lasting dye of the tekhelet line was made with a snail, most likely H. trunculus. These lines later served as the visual inspiration for the flag of modern Israel. The all-white variety is customary among Sepharadic communities, whereas among Ashkenazic communities the tendency is toward white tallitot with black stripes. The stripes on the tallit may have their origin in the clavia, purple stripes which were worn on the tunics of distinguished Romans. One explanation for the significance of the black stripes is that their black color symbolizes the destruction of the Temple in Jerusalem and the exile of the Jews from the land of Israel.

In many Jewish communities, the tallit is worn in the synagogue by all men and boys over bar mitzvah age (and in some communities even younger). Aside from German Jews and Oberlander Jews, men in most Ashkenazi communities (which comprise the majority of Jews in America today) start wearing the tallit after their wedding.

== Women ==
In rabbinic law, women are not required to wear a tallit or other forms of tzitzit. The vast majority of contemporary Orthodox authorities forbid the donning of a tallit by women, although Moshe Feinstein, Joseph Soloveitchik, and Eliezer Melamed approve women wearing tzitzit in private, if their motivation is "for God's sake" rather than motivated by external movements such as feminism. At the gender-segregated sections of the Western Wall, women have been permitted to wear shawls worn around the neck—but harassed, expelled or arrested for wearing the more traditional garments outside the segregated men's section.

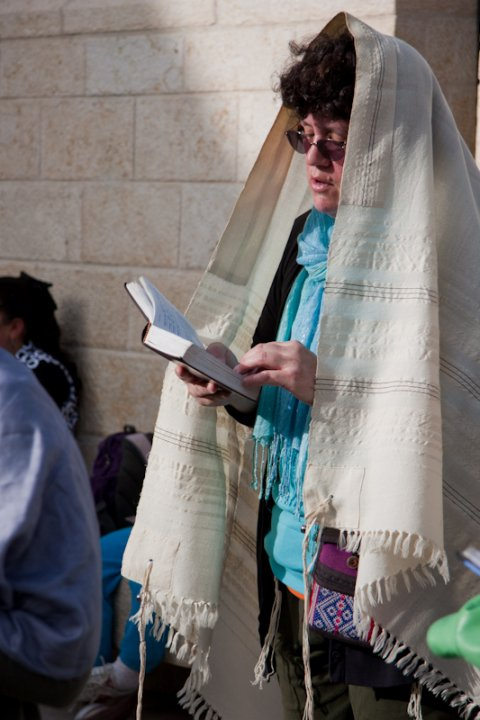
Woman praying with tallit

Women in non-Orthodox (Reform, Conservative, Karaite, Reconstructionist and others) are not prohibited from wearing a tallit, and usually encouraged to do so, especially when called to the Torah or leading services from the bimah. Women in Conservative Judaism began to revive the wearing of the tallit in the 1970s, usually using colors and fabrics distinct from the traditional garment worn by men, in the spirit of (but not necessarily out of adherence to) the contemporary Orthodox rulings regarding women not wearing "male-style" garments. It has become common in Reform and other non-Orthodox streams for girls to receive a tallit at their bat mitzvah, although some do not subsequently wear it on a regular basis. Other women have adopted the tallit later in life, including the larger, traditional style, to connect with their communities, embody egalitarian values, or create a personalized connection to Judaism. It is rare for women to wear a tallit katan.
