= Alice Cleveland =

American home shopping host (1949–2023)

- Born: Alice Tipton; May 21, 1949; St. Petersburg, Florida, U.S.
- Died: June 27, 2023 (aged 74)
- Occupation: Home shopping host

Alice Cleveland (May 21, 1949 – June 27, 2023) was an American television home shopping host on HSN and most recently an on-air vendor representative on QVC.

She was born Alice Tipton in St. Petersburg, Florida.

She was fired from HSN shortly after being diagnosed with myasthenia gravis, a neuromuscular disease; HSN maintained that her dismissal was based on the network's dissatisfaction with her hosting style, and because she appeared in an unauthorized infomercial on another station. A court awarded Cleveland $495,000 in actual and punitive damages, believing Cleveland's claim that she lost her job because of her illness, which would be a violation of the Americans with Disabilities Act.

She died in 2023.
