= Home shopping host =

Television host who helps promote products

A home shopping host is the on-air host that partners with guests on television shopping channels, such as HSN, QVC, Jewelry Television and ShopHQ. The job of a home shopping host is to introduce new presenters and guests to the television audience, and help these guests explain the values and features of the product being showcased.

== History ==
Back in 1977, Clearwater, Florida radio station owner Lowell 'Bud' Paxson was collecting money from local companies that advertised on his station. One local company, a hardware store owner, refused payment, insisting that not one single customer had heard the broadcast of his radio advertisements. Paxson and the store owner argued back and forth, eventually coming to a compromise: Instead of a financial payment, the store owner gave Paxson a box filled with electric can openers. Paxson took the box, and returned to the radio station.

When the station's talk radio host, Bob Circosta, was on a newsbreak, Paxson asked Circosta to sell these can openers to his audience. Circosta initially objected, but soon complied with his Paxson's wishes. "I looked at him like he had three heads," Circosta said, recalling the moment. "I thought it would be unethical because I was trying to be a serious host." When Circosta returned to the airwaves, he began describing the can openers and asking listeners to buy them. All 112 can openers were purchased in under an hour.

Sensing the sales potential of live, on-air product selling, Lowell 'Bud' Paxson and financier Roy Speer co-founded a local cable TV channel (channel 52 on Vision Cable) in 1982 that sold products directly to Florida viewers, and then launched nationwide in 1985. The channel was the Home Shopping Club, later Home Shopping Network, and Paxson's former radio man Bob Circosta was tapped as the network's first-ever host. HSN soon became a billion dollar enterprise and began the home shopping / electronic retailing industry. In 1996, the two sold HSN to Hollywood executive Barry Diller.

In addition to Bob Circosta, other early home shopping hosts were Alice Cleveland, Bobbi Ray Carter, Tina Berry, Dan Dennis, John Cremeans, Maven Huffman and Lisa Robertson.

== Job requirements ==
On all the major television shopping channels, the home shopping host will stay on the air for one to three hours at a time, welcoming several new guests and demonstrating many new products. Since products and guests are often only given 10 or 15 minutes to sell their product in the world of home shopping, it's not uncommon for a host to be required to introduce 20 or more different products and inventions during their shift. Being quick-witted, personable, and likeable is essential for a host, as well as being able to make quick transitions from one product to another. Additionally, with networks like HSN and QVC routinely debuting brand new inventions and products, the host must also quickly articulate to the audience why the item is worth purchasing.

== Job difficulties ==
All the national American home shopping channels are broadcast live, 24 hours a day, so mistakes and errors cannot be edited out. This has led to some memorable on-air home shopping bloopers, such as a QVC demonstrator falling from a ladder and getting injured, or a Shop at Home host insisting that a moth in a photograph is actually a horse.

Many of the guests who accompany the home shopping host on-air are not particularly TV-savvy or experienced, so the host must help guests better define the attributes and value of the items being showcased.

Because of the large influx of guests and products, hosts often lack the time to study the product beforehand, which increases the need for an effective host to possess sufficient verbal skills to mask this lack of direct product knowledge.
