= Pinsker =

Pinsker is an habitational surname for someone from Pinsk, in Belarus. Notable people with the surname include:

- Leon Pinsker (1821–1891), Russian physician and Zionist activist
- Mark Semenovich Pinsker (1925–2003), Russian mathematician
- Sarah Pinsker, American science fiction and fantasy author
- Scott Pinsker, filmmaker, talk show host, and author
- Simhah Pinsker (1801–1864), Polish-Jewish scholar and archeologist
