= Auschwitz Jewish Center in Oświęcim =

Auschwitz Jewish Center
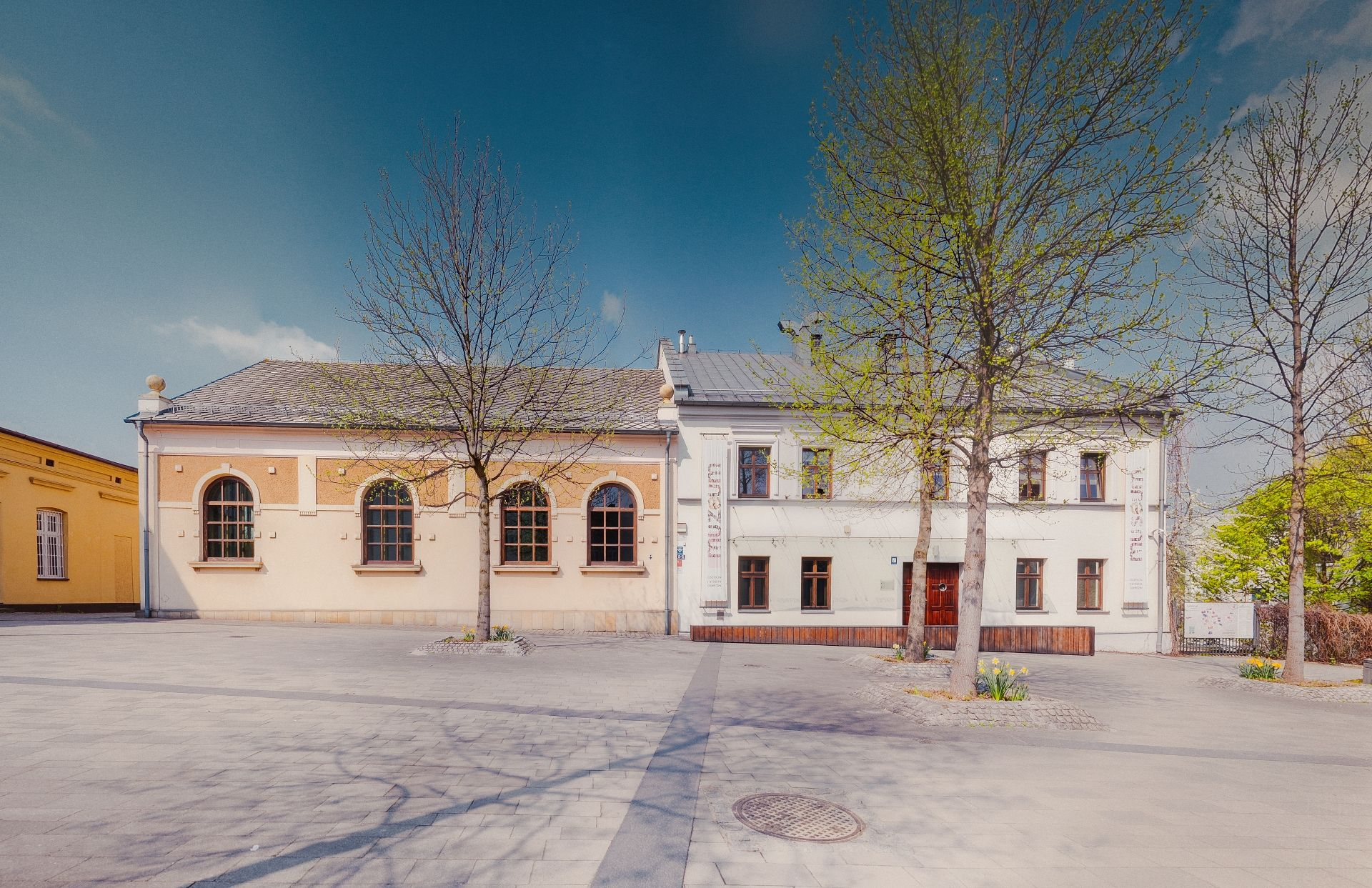
- A general look at the Auschwitz Jewish Center
- Established: 1995
- Location: Plac Ks. Jana Skarbka 5, 32-600 Oświęcim, Poland
- Coordinates: 50.040047°N 19.220502°E
- Type: Jewish museum
- Director: Tomasz Kuncewicz
- Curator: Artur Szyndler
- Website: ajcf.pl/en/

The Auschwitz Jewish Center is a non-governmental organization whose mission is to preserve the memory of the Jewish community of the city of Oświęcim and educate about the dangers of anti-Semitism, racism and other prejudices and intolerance.

The Center runs the Jewish Museum in Oświęcim highlighting the history of the local Jewish community, looks after the only preserved synagogue in the city, the Khevre Loymdei Mishnayos Synagogue, and the home of the last Jewish resident of Oświęcim, Shimson Kleuger, which now incorporates a café along with exhibition and educational space.

The Auschwitz Jewish Center makes the Jewish cemetery in Oświęcim, owned by the Jewish community in Bielsko-Biała, available to visitors.

== History ==
In 1995, the Auschwitz Jewish Center Foundation was established in New York with the aim of creating a Jewish cultural and educational center in Oświęcim. A year later, a sister organization, Fundacja Edukacyjne Centrum Żydowskie in Oświęcim, was established in order to carry out this task. In September 2000, the Jewish Center was officially opened.

== Activities ==
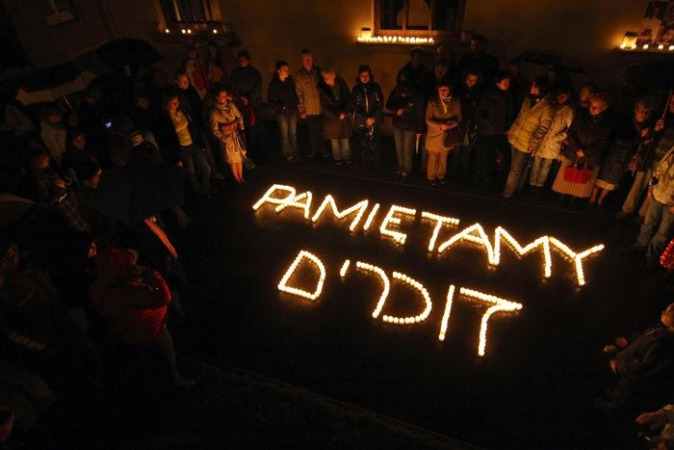
The 67. Anniversary of the Deportation of Oświęcim Jews

Before the Holocaust, Oswiecim was a bustling town with a mostly Jewish population with synagogues, study houses, clubs, schools, shops and other businesses. Jews had lived there for centuries and were active in all spheres of life. Only a few physical traces remain. The Center carries out its mission by making these traces available to visitors. Visitors can take advantage of guided tours of the Museum, as well as the city.

Educational workshops on Judaism, the history of Jews in Oświęcim and human rights are offered for school groups from Poland and abroad. Special study programs on the history of the Holocaust as well as contemporary prejudices and hate-motivated violence are prepared for students, teachers and uniformed services.

=== Annual Dinner ===
The Auschwitz Jewish Center Foundation (AJCF) hosts an annual dinner in New York City, starting in 2022, where the foundation grants a "Fighting Hatred" award. The first dinner was held in June at the Intrepid Museum in Manhattan. In its inaugural year, the award was presented to Austrian and American actor and former governor of California Arnold Schwarzenegger, who then visited Auschwitz in September that year with foundation chairman Simon Bergson, who is the son of survivors of the camp.

=== RISE Leadership ===
In 2026, AJCF director general Jack Simony launched the RISE Leadership initiative (an acronym for "resilience, inspiration, solidarity and education"), which brings together students from historically black colleges and universities and Jewish institutions for joint trips to Poland, Ghana and New York. That year, the program took students from Wilberforce University and Touro University to Warsaw, the Treblinka extermination camp and the Auschwitz concentration camp. In 2026, RISE plans to take students to Ghana as well, to learn about the African diaspora.

== Oshpitzin Jewish Museum ==
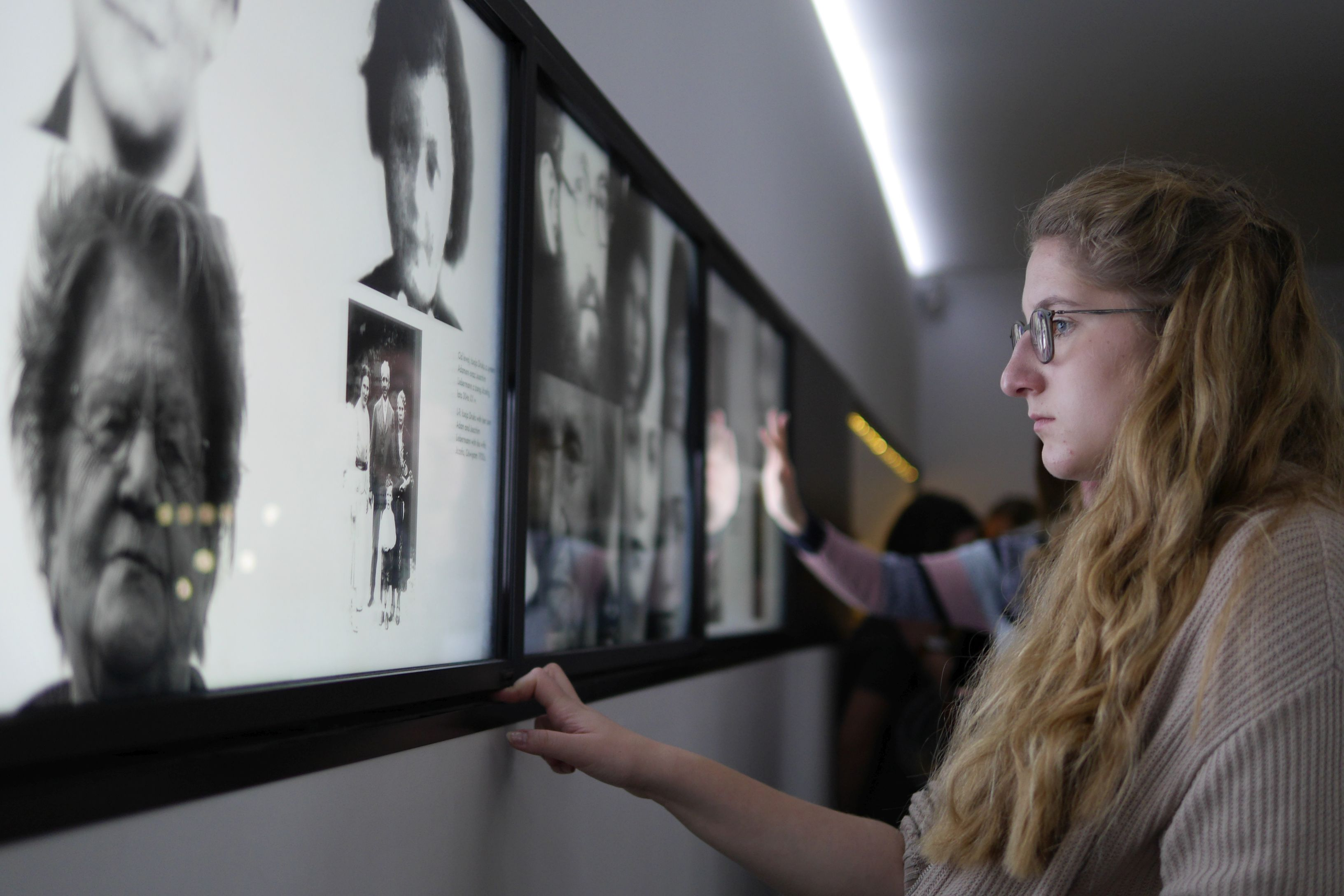
Memory gallery at the Jewish museum, AJC

The Jewish Museum is located in a building adjacent to the synagogue, which was previously owned by the Kornreich and Dattner families. The permanent exhibition is called "Oshpitzin. The History of Jewish Oświęcim” and presents over 400 years of Jewish presence in Oświęcim through photographs, archival documents, historic exhibits and multimedia, including recorded accounts of former inhabitants of Oświęcim.

=== Historical artifacts ===
==== Items from the Great Synagogue in Oświęcim ====
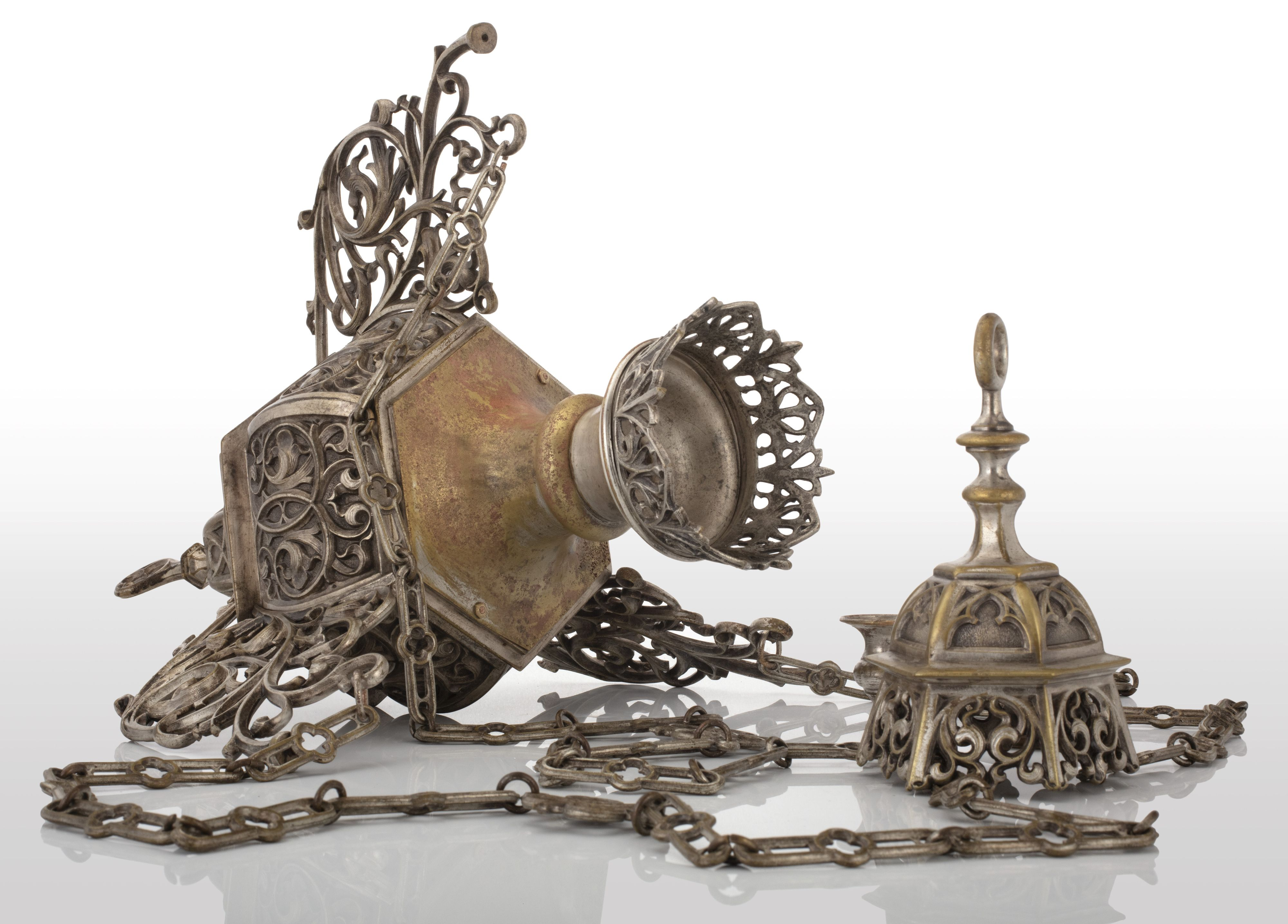
Ner Tamid lamp from the Great Synagogue in Oświęcim

The Jewish Museum exhibits items found during excavations performed in 2004-2005 on the area of the destroyed Great Synagogue in Oświęcim. The work was carried out by archaeologists from the Nicolaus Copernicus University in Toruń, under the supervision of dr Małgorzata Grupa, during which the team recovered over 400 elements of the temple's equipment. The items were subsequently renovated and catalogued as part of the Jewish Museum Collection.

The Ner Tamid (Hebrew for eternal light) was found, along with other items, during the archaeological work carried out in the area of the Great Synagogue on Berka Joselewicza Street in 2004. The lamp was most often hung above or by the Aron Kodesh (previously in a niche on the western wall of the synagogue) and was lit regardless of whether the synagogue is empty or closed. This tradition is meant to remind of the constantly lit menorah in the ancient Temple of Jerusalem.

=== The Register of Survivors ===
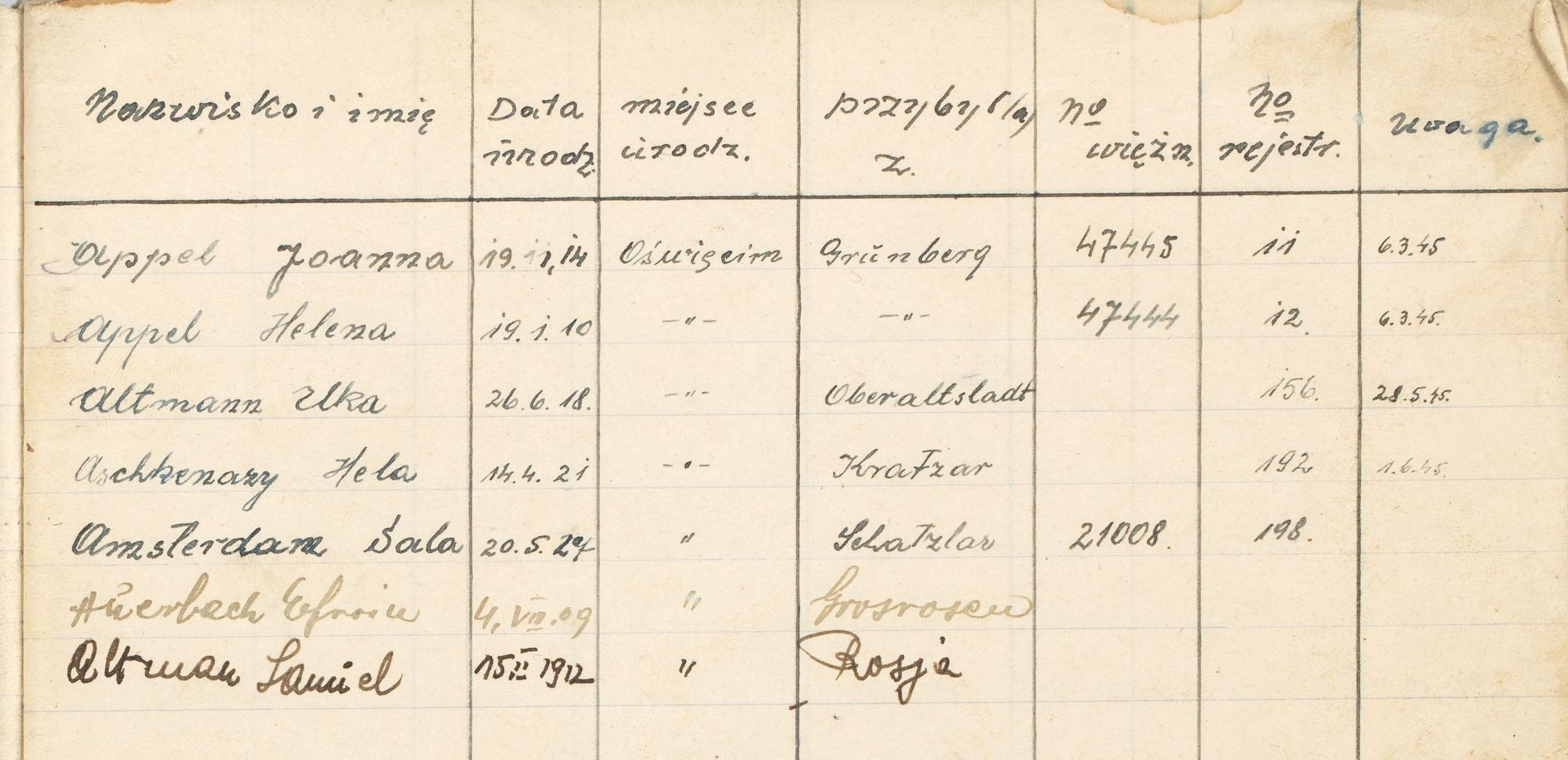
A page from Maurycy Bodner's Register of Survivors

The Register of Jewish residents of Oświęcim was run by the local Jewish Committee, which was established in April 1945. The notebook contains the names of several hundred Jews who survived the Holocaust and returned to Oświęcim. Most of the people whose names were included in the register remained in Oświęcim for only a brief period. The list includes both prewar residents of the town and survivors from other areas. The register was compiled by Maurycy Bodner, president of the Committee.

=== Iconography ===
==== Photographs and documents of the Jewish community ====
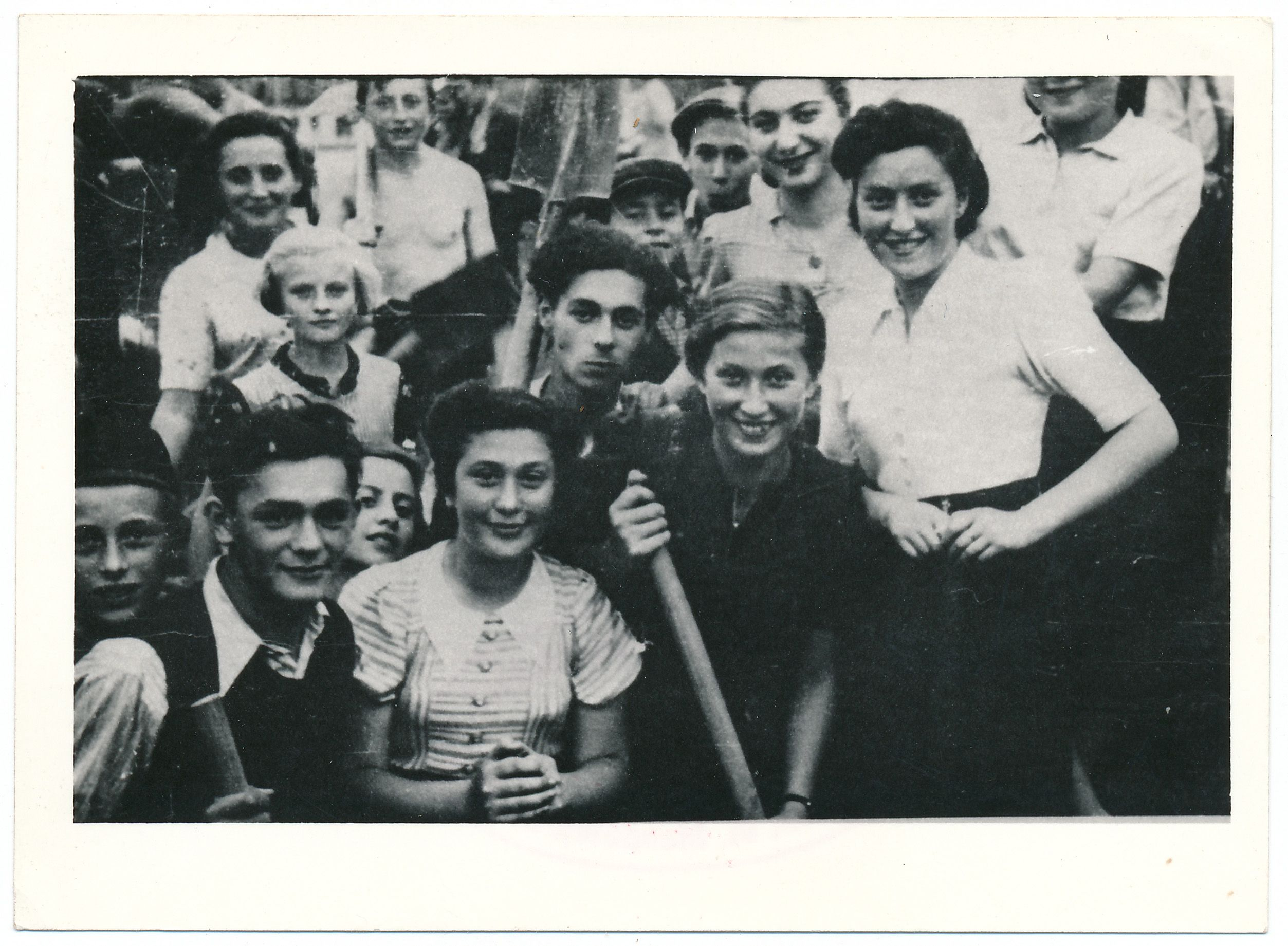
Jewish and Catholic inhabitants of Oświęcim in 1939 digging anti-tank trenches. Collection of the Jewish Museum in Oświęcim.

The Museum collection also comprises photographs of the Jewish and Polish inhabitants of the pre-war Oświęcim, letters written by members of the community, certificates, permits and other archival materials documenting the life of the Oświęcim community before the war.

Before Auschwitz and the town of Oświęcim became a symbol of the Holocaust, it was an ordinary Polish town, in which Jews made their home from the early 16th century. In the years preceding the Second World War, the majority of Oświęcim’s citizens were Jewish; subsequent generations contributed to a rich and layered local culture. The collections of the Jewish Museum aim to connect the present-day public with the stories of the pre-war Jewish community through photographs, documents, and recorded testimonies of survivors.

== Synagogue ==
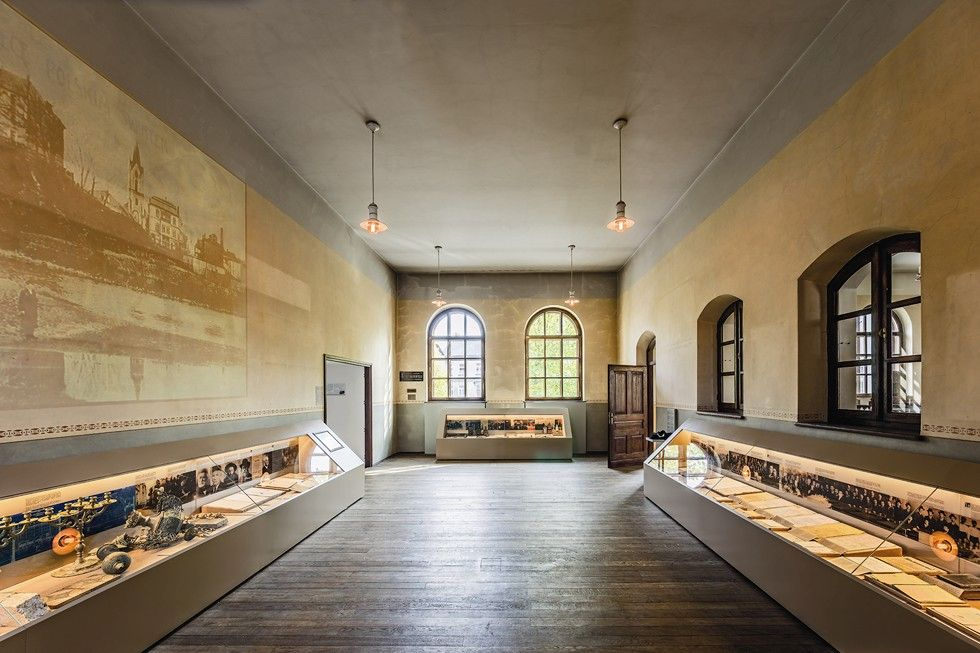
Women's gallery at the Oświęcim Synagogue, currently an exhibition space

The Khevre Loymdei Mishnayos (English translation: Association of Those Who Study Mishna) is the only Jewish house of prayer in Oświęcim, that has survived to the present day (close to twenty functioned in and around town before the war).

Its construction began around 1913, and it performed its functions until 1939. In the interwar period. During the war, the Nazi occupiers destroyed the interior of the synagogue and used it as an ammunition warehouse. After the war, a small group of Holocaust survivors used the synagogue again for prayers. During the Polish People's Republic, the building was partially abandoned and then became a carpet warehouse.

The last remaining survivor of Auschwitz living on Oświęcim, Shimson Kleuger, made efforts to preserve the building and to campaign for its renovation and restoration.

In 2000, the synagogue was reopened after renovation. Today, the Oświęcim Synagogue does not have its own rabbi, nor a congregation of the faithful, but remains the only Jewish place of religious worship near the former KL Auschwitz camp, serving on an ad hoc basis as a place of prayer, reflection and remembrance.

== Kleuger House ==
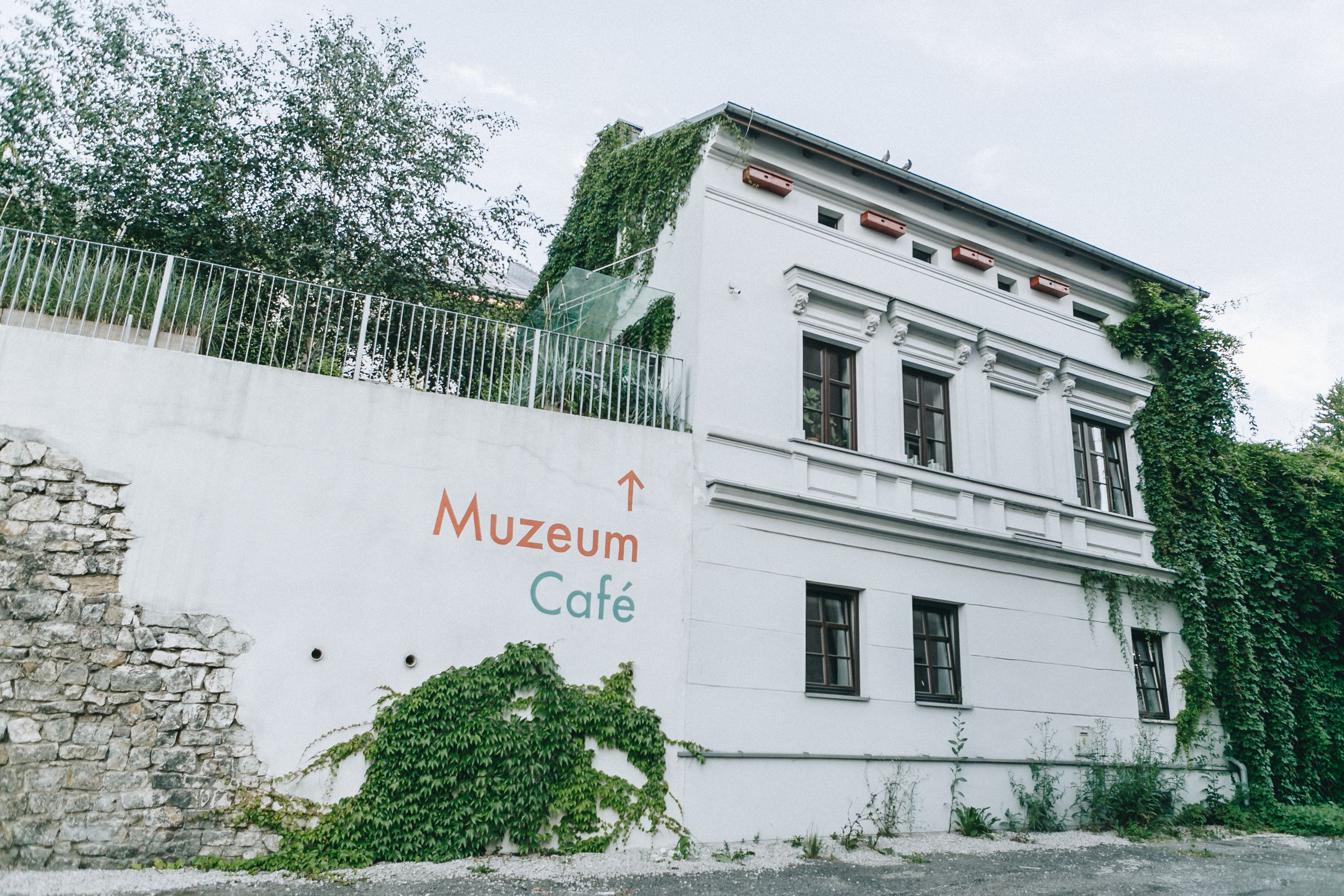
The Kleuger House in 2020

Behind the Oświęcim synagogue there is a 100-year-old house in which the Jewish Kluger family lived before the war. Only three of their children survived the Holocaust, including Shimson Kleuger (1925-2000), who from 1961 until his death again lived in the family home. The building was then donated by his heirs to the Auschwitz Jewish Center, which in 2013 carried out a major renovation and conversion to the Cafe Bergson museum café, along with educational and exhibition space. The original entrance door with a trace of the mezuzah has been preserved and the historical elements of the building inside have been exposed. At Cafe Bergson, cultural and educational projects are carried out on both the past of Oświęcim and the contemporary subject of human rights and the natural environment.
