= Bob Circosta =

Bob Circosta is an American businessman and TV host. He is television's first-ever home-shopping host and has achieved over $1 billion in personal product sales on live television. His offices are in Clearwater, Florida, just a few miles from the Home Shopping Network (HSN)'s corporate building.

== Career ==
In 1977, Circosta began advertising can openers on his radio talk show, and all the stock he had was sold out within an hour. Recognizing the vast sales potential, Bud Paxson, the owner of the station where Circosta's show aired, founded a local home shopping cable station, which later launched nationwide with HSN. Bob Circosta was their first-ever home shopping host, becoming one of the world's most prolific and identifiable salesmen in the process. Circosta still makes regular appearances on HSN and also hosts the syndicated TV program What a Great Idea! nationwide, where he scours the landscape for eye-catching new products and inventions to debut.

Given his historic sales accomplishments and familiarity with television viewers, Circosta is one of the most sought-after lecturers and business consultants. He regularly appears at corporate conferences and sales conventions in the entrepreneurial world, including the Enlightened Wealth Institute, CEO Space, and the T. Harv Eker World's Greatest Marketing Seminar.
