= Shopping channel =

Television shopping specialty channel

Shopping channels (also referred to in British English as teleshopping) are television programs or specialty channels dedicated to home shopping. These channels typically feature live presentations and product demonstrations, with on-air hosts and spokespeople delivering a sales pitch. Viewers are provided with instructions on how to order the featured products. Shopping channels may focus on mainstream merchandise such as clothing, consumer electronics, and household goods, or on more niche categories like collectibles, high-end fashion, and jewelry. The term may also refer to channels that exclusively broadcast direct-response advertising and infomercial content.

== History ==
The concept of shopping channels was first popularized in the United States during the 1980s, when Lowell "Bud" Paxson and Roy Speer launched a local cable channel called the Home Shopping Club, which later expanded nationally as the Home Shopping Network (HSN). It soon faced competition from QVC, which eventually acquired HSN in 2017. Another competitor, the Shop at Home Network, had its assets sold by Scripps to Jewelry Television (JTV) in 2006, which merged its operations with JTV and aired Shop at Home as a block during prime time and late-night hours.

ShopHQ, another U.S.-based shopping network, was at one point partly owned by NBCUniversal and co-branded as "ShopNBC." However, NBCU sold its stake back to ValueVision, the majority owner, in 2013.

Initially reliant on telephone ordering, home shopping channels have increasingly emphasized online shopping to compete with online-only retailers, while distinguishing themselves with on-air sales pitches and exclusive offers. In 2015, QVC acquired the online retailer Zulily to strengthen its digital presence.

Notable shopping channels outside the U.S. include TV Shop and QVC UK in Europe, The Shopping Channel in New Zealand, Momo in Taiwan, Shop TV in the Philippines, and TSC in Canada.
