= History of the Jews in Bielsko-Biała =

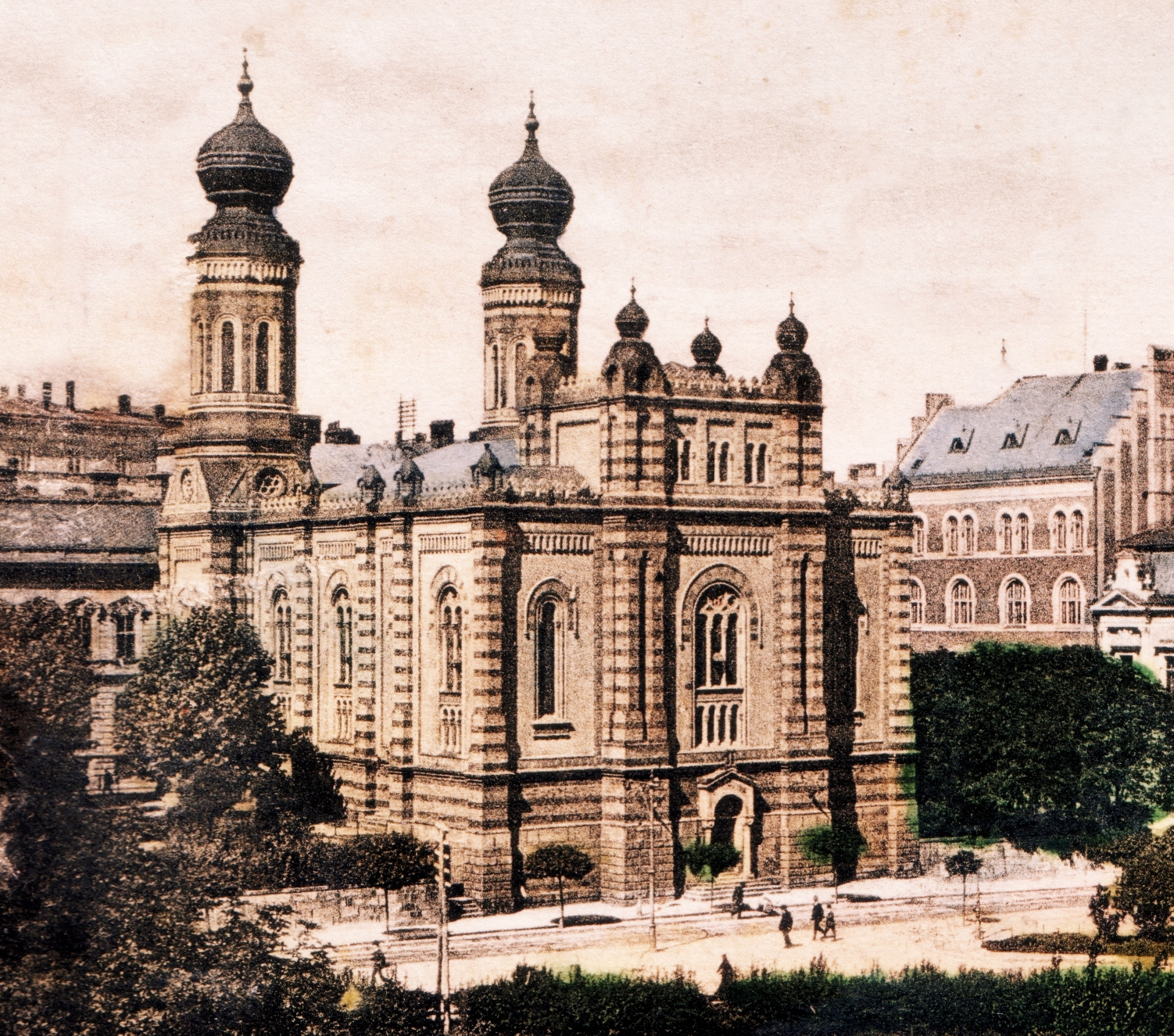
Great Liberal Synagogue in Bielsko 1881-1939

Jews in Bielsko-Biała (German: Juden in Bielitz-Biala, Hebrew: הקהילה היהודית בילסקו ביאלה), is a Jewish society with its headquarters in Bielsko-Biała, Poland. Nowadays, the area of its activity covers Cieszyn Silesia and western Lesser Poland, including the city of Oświęcim (German: Auschwitz).

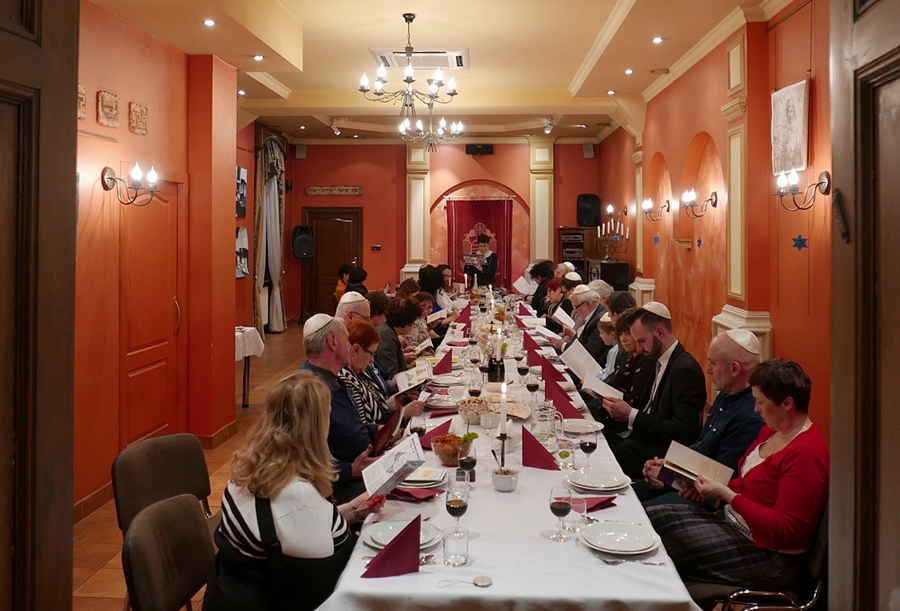
Passover Seder in Jewish Community in Bielsko-Biała in 2018

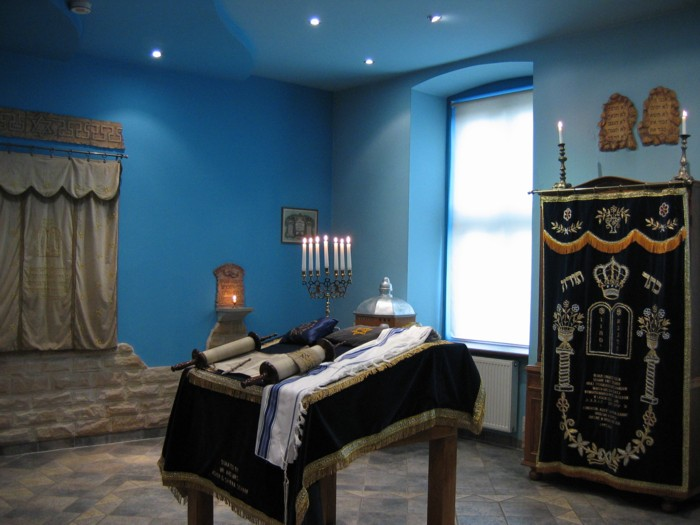
The interior of the contemporary Beit Midrash in Bielsko-Biała in 2007

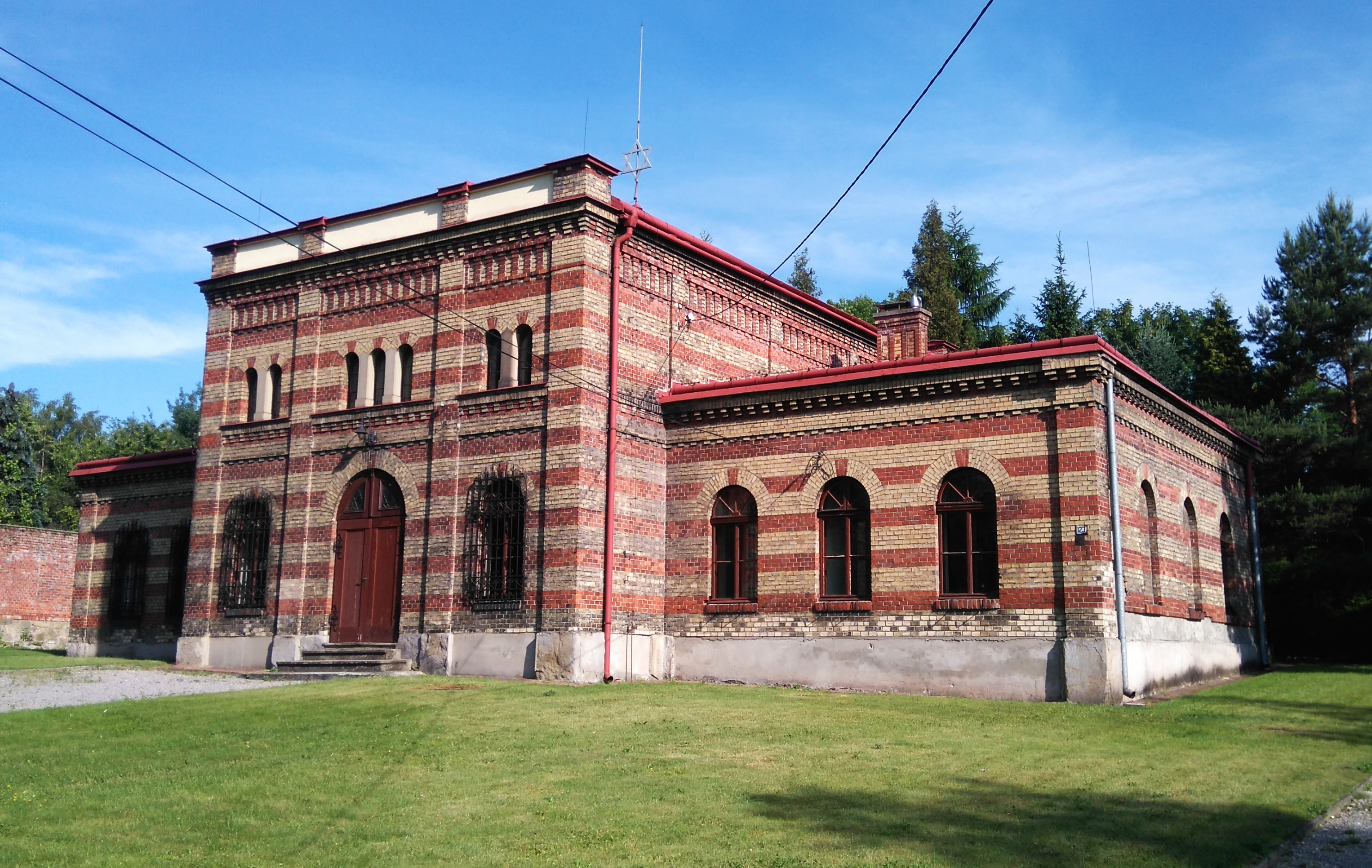
Pre-burial house at the Jewish cemetery in Bielsko-Biała

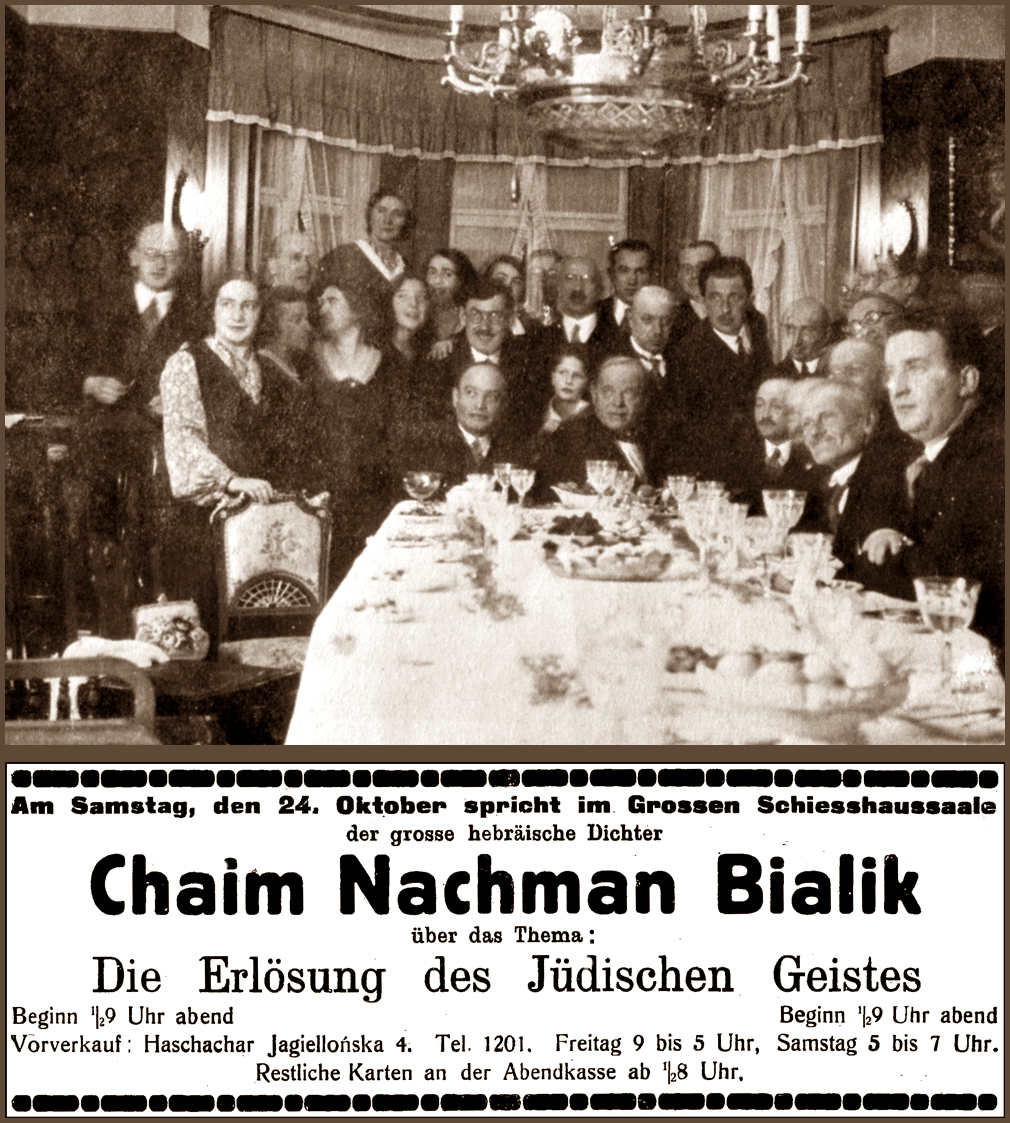
Poet Hayim Nahman Bialik in Bielsko on October 24, 1931

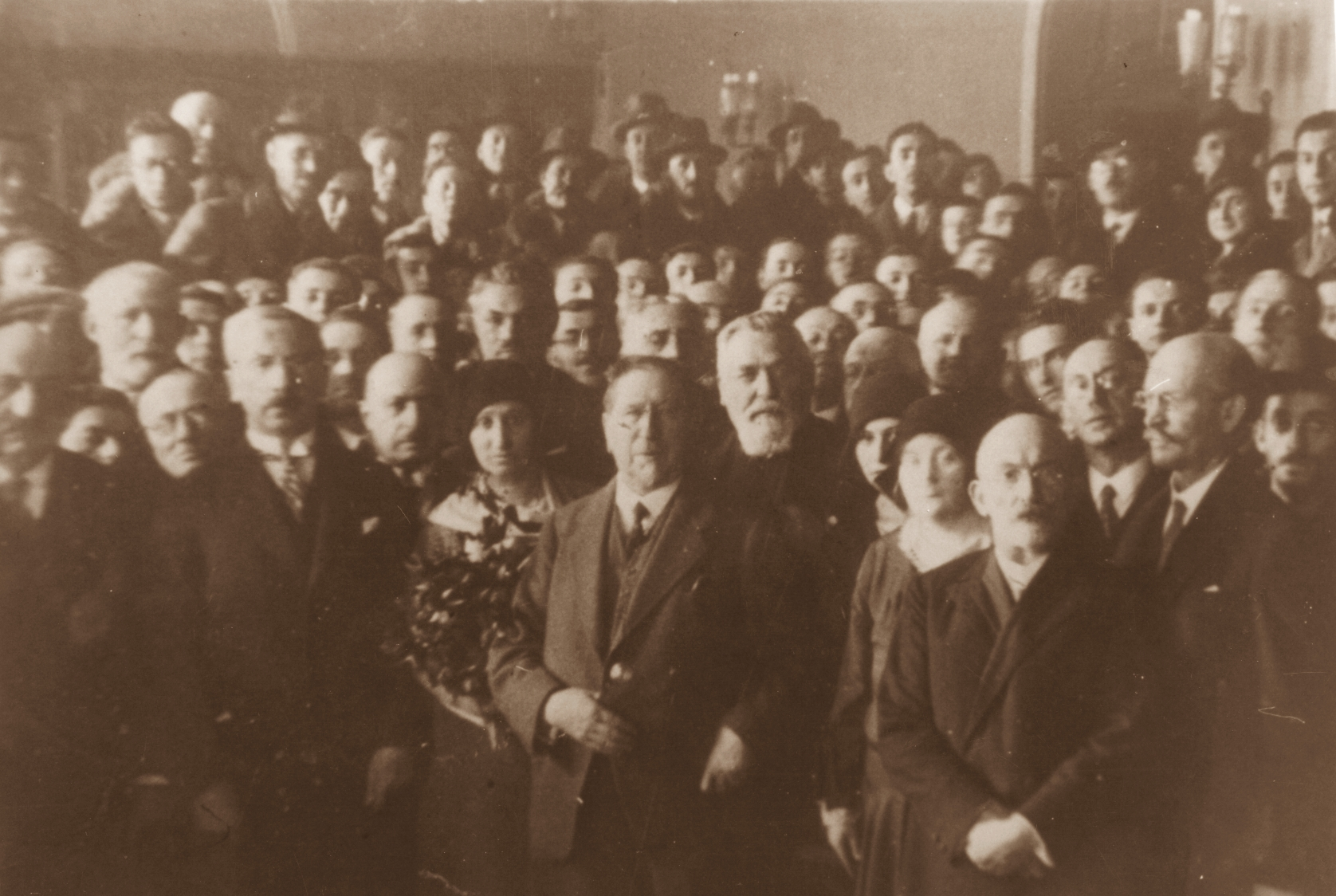
Zionist Nahum Sokolow in Bielsko 30 October 1933 with activists from Zionist organizations from Bielsko

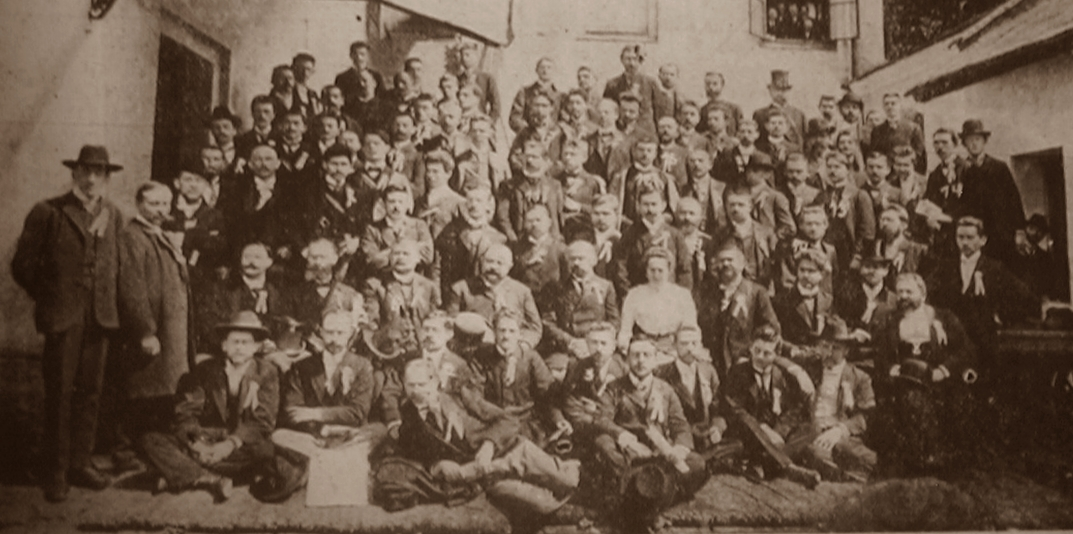
The Zionist Congress for the countries of the Austro-Hungarian monarchy in Bielsko (Bielitz) 18–19 May 1902

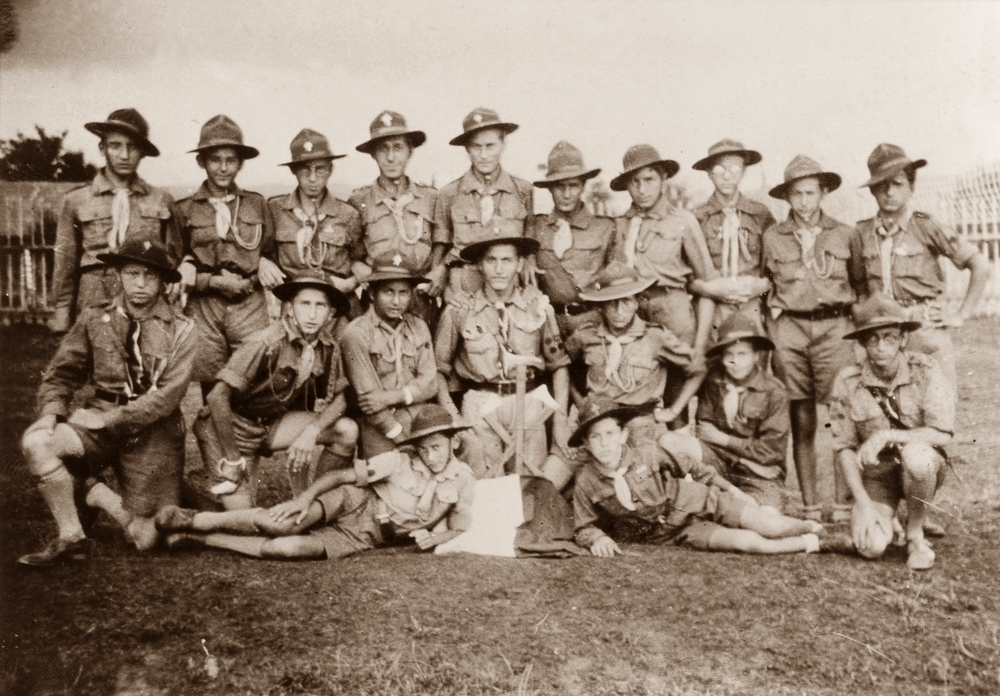
Scouting team of the Hanoar Hacijoni Bielsko-Biała, circa 1935

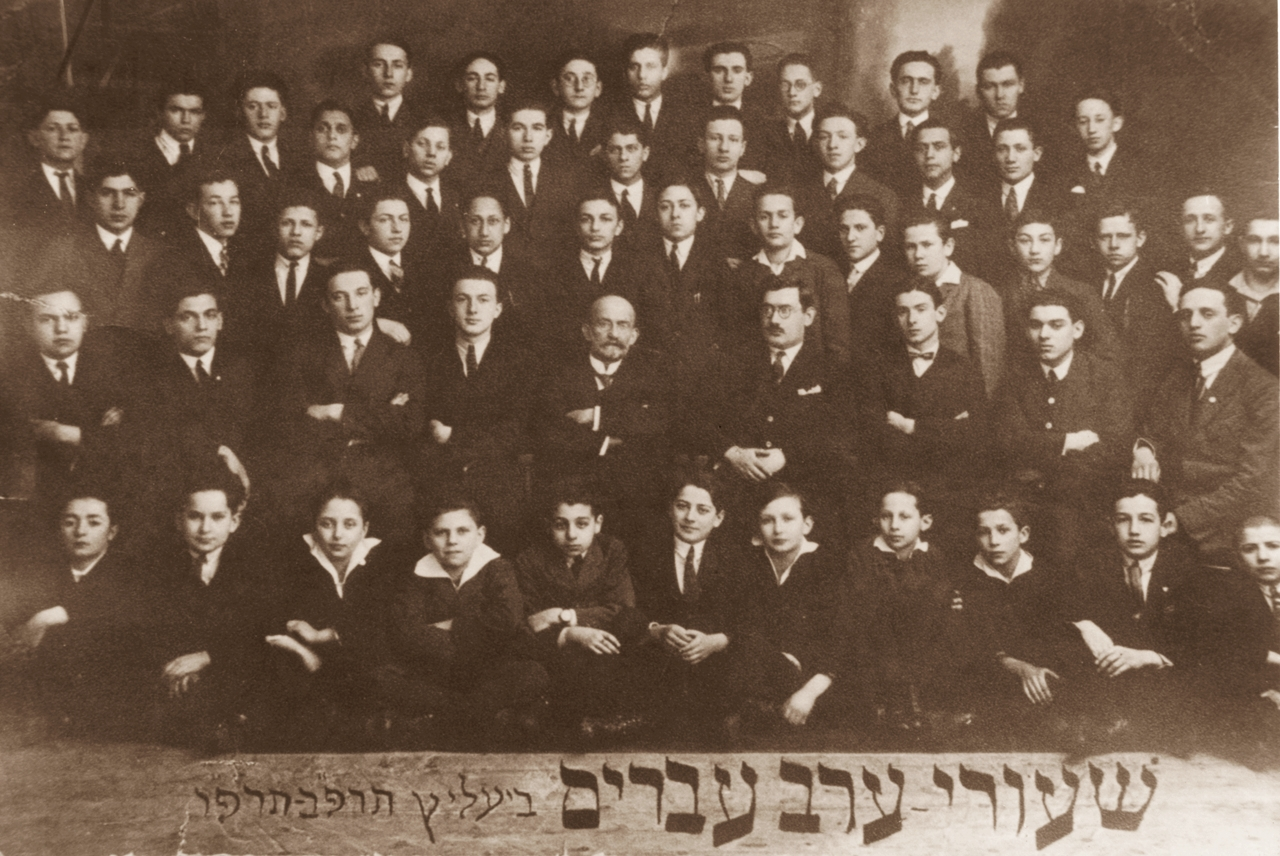
Evening Hebrew language school in Bielsko in 1922-1926

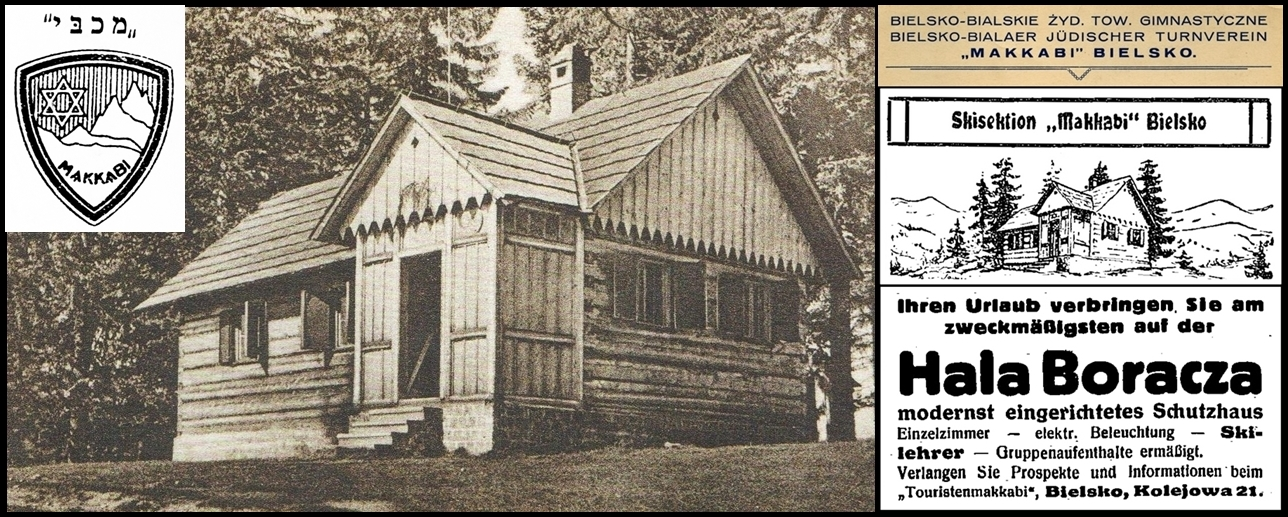
The first Jewish tourist mountain hostel in the world of the Jewish Tourist and Ski Association Maccabi Bielsko 1929 on Hala Boracza in Żywiec Beskids

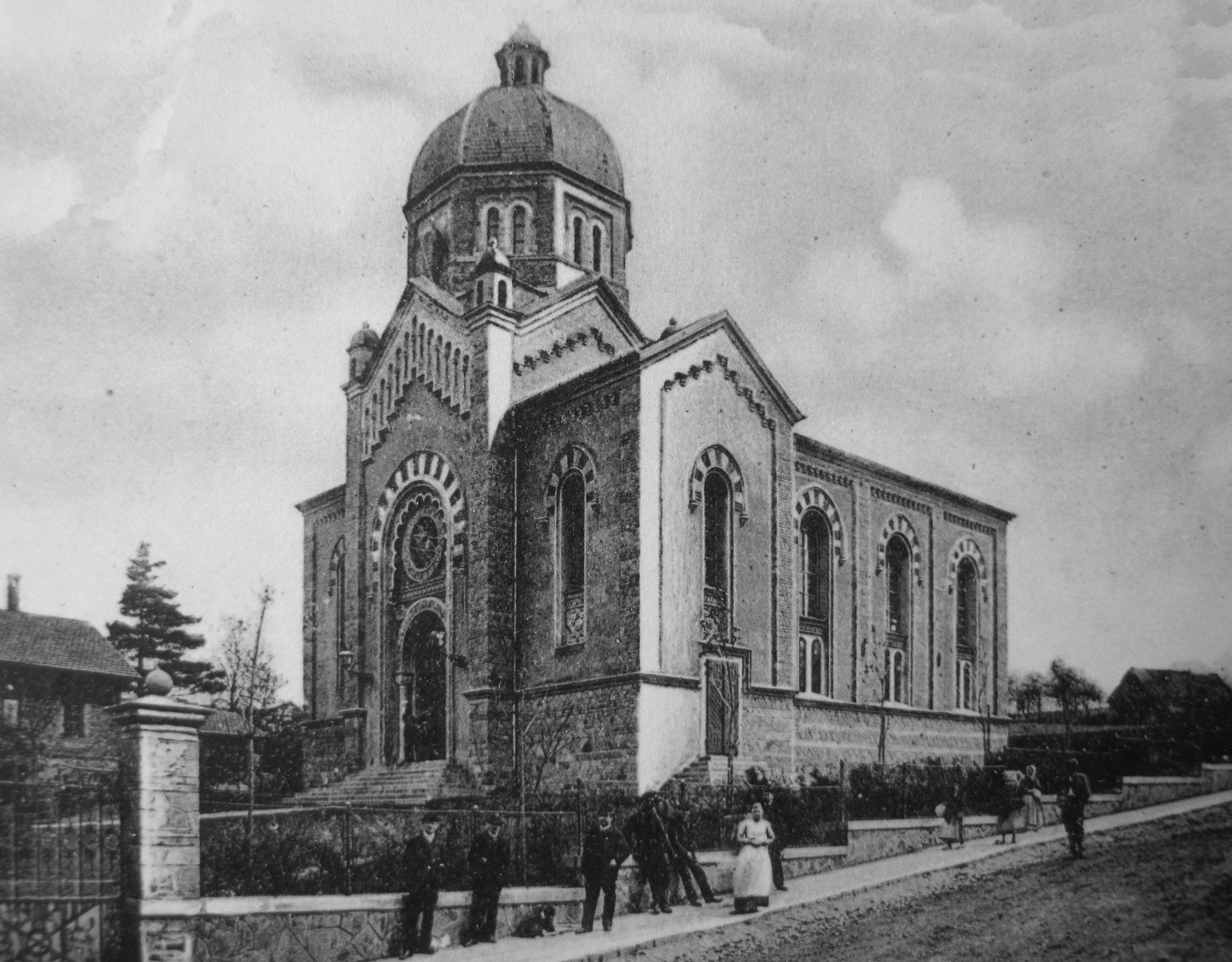
Synagogue in Biała 1889-1939

== Geographical and political location ==
The city of Bielsko (German: Bielitz) and the city of Biała (German: Biala) are two separate cities located next to each other. Both towns are separated only with the Biała river, which used to be the border between the Kingdom of Bohemia and the Polish Kingdom (1327–1526), between the Habsburg monarchy and the Polish Kingdom (1526–1772), between Austrian Silesia and Galicia under Austrian Empire (1772–1918) and between Silesian Voivodeship and Kraków Voivodeship under the Second Polish Republic (1918–1939). The border between the countries and regions also became the conventional line separating the influence of German Reform Judaism in Silesia from the Orthodox Judaism and Hasidism prevalent in Galicia. The cities were merged in 1951.

== History of Jews in Bielsko (Bielitz) ==
In the Middle Ages, Jews appeared in Cieszyn Silesia as passable merchants. They settled permanently in Cieszyn in the 17th century. In the middle of 18th c. first Jews settled in Bielsko and they were subject to Jewish community in Cieszyn for a century. The followers of Judaism settled in the town due to its economic attractiveness. The proximity of the border with the Kingdom of Poland, with Prussia and with Upper Hungary was an advantage for the trade and in 1772, when southern Lesser Poland along with Lipnik-Biała was attached to Austria, the town’s economy started to flourish. Additionally, the patent of tolerance issued by Joseph II on 15 December 1781 increased the scope of craft-related activities available to the Jews and allowed them to set up textile manufactures. At the same time, it imposed an obligation on the Jews to learn and use German language. Another edict from 1787 obliged the Jews to assume German names and surnames. As a result of these acts, local Jews started adopting German culture and supporting the German liberal party, which created favourable conditions for the process of assimilation with the other inhabitants of the town and later on – for the adoption of the Haskalah ideals. Until 1849 the burials of the Jews in Bielsko were held at the Jewish cemetery in Cieszyn. Jewish community in Bielsko became an autonomous legal entity on 27 December 1865. It adopted the name Israelitische Kultusgemeinde in Bielitz. After the break-up of Austro-hungarian empire, the authorities of Silesian Voivodeship acknowledged the community’s Polish statute and approved its new name: Żydowska Gmina Wyznaniowa w Bielsku (Jewish Community in Bielsko). This name was used until the outbreak of the Second World War in September 1939 when the city was incorporated into Nazi Germany, and the Jewish Community name was changed to Ältestenrat der jüdischen Gemeinde in Bielitz (Elder Council of Jewish Community in Bielsko). In February 1945, immediately after the offensive of soviet army, a Komitet Żydowski w Bielsku (Committee of Jews in Bielsko) was formed, and then renamed to Congregation of the Jewish Faith (Polish: Kongregacja Wyznania Mojżeszowego) in 1946. In 1995 it adopted its pre-war name: Gmina Wyznaniowa Żydowska w Bielsku-Białej (Jewish Community in Bielsko-Biała).

The Jewish community of Bielsko was very important and pioneered many activities on the borderline of between the world of Polish orthodox Jews and the German assimilated Reformed Jews. The first philanthropic association “B'nai B'rith” in Austro-Hungarian Empire was founded in Bielsko in 1889. The Jewish enlightenment (Haskalah) was developing rapidly here, few rabbis from Bielsko became professors at progressive seminaries in Wrocław and Berlin. Prof. Michael Berkowicz who lived in Bielsko was a friend of Theodor Herzl, and wrote a first translation to Hebrew of his Zionist manifesto “Der Judenstaat”.

The percentage of Jews in the total population of the town remain close to 20%. In 1921 there were 3982 Jews, in 1928, 4520, in 1930, 5200, and in 1939 their number exceeded 5 thousand.

The Jewish cemetery in Bielsko is the only one in Poland where Muslims (soldiers from World War I) and Christians (from mixed marriages) are buried together with Jews.

The most important progressive and official rabbis were: Hirsch Heinrich Morgenstern, Dr. Lazar Frankfurter (1865–1874), Dr. Wolf Lesser (1875–1882), Dr. Adolf Kurrein (1882–1888), Dr. Saul Horowitz (1888–1896), Dr. Markus Steiner (1896–1939). The most important orthodox rabbis were: Jecheskiel Paneth, Menachem Mendel Stern, Moshe Stern, Izak Stern.

== History of Jews in Biała (Biala) ==
At the beginning, Biała was a hamlet next to the nearby village of Lipnik, whose inhabitants were mainly craftsmen or cloth manufacturers. Jews resided in Biala at the end of the 17th century. At that time, Jews used to have four houses and they had a colony which was related to the mansion of the manor of the district governors. They leased a tavern, a brewery and like local craftsmen, they developed their textile business. In 18th century in Biała and Lipnik there were more than 100 Jews, which constituted about 20% of the total population. In the records of the customs chamber in Biala from 1763 there are numerous names of the Jews who crossed the border between Kraków Province and Austrian Silesia. In 1765 Biała was inhabited by 250 to 350 Jews, which constituted 20% of the total population. In 1870 the number of Jews was estimated as 270 people. In 1849, just like in the nearby Bielsko, also in Biała a new Jewish cemetery was set up (nowadays Wyzwolenia street). In the 1860s many new Jewish immigrants came to Biala, mainly from Upper Hungary (Slovakia) and Upper Silesia. In 1870 Jewish community was as many as 500 members. In 1865 the local Jews decided to detach from the community in Oświęcim and submitted a draft statute to the authorities. They were mostly progressive Jews, drawing on the tradition of the German Haskalah. They participated in the social and political life of the town, considering themselves its rightful citizens.

The official religious community was made up of Jews with a liberal and conservative approach to Judaism. Orthodox and Hasidic community attended to their own religious schools (cheders) and private tutors. Lack of cooperative opportunities with liberal rabbi Dr. Glaser made the Hasidim bring a Hasidic rabbi, Aron Halberstam (from Sanz Hasidic dynasty), it's Biala. The Hasidim did not attend the official progressive synagogue. When Halberstam arrived in Biala in 1889, they used to meet their private home, synagogue at first, in Biala, 11-Listopada Street 63b. Later, Salo Kalfus made his own tenement house in Szpitalna street available as the orthodox synagogue. In order to maintain their synagogue, the Biala Hasidim along with Rabbi Halberstam created a religious association for Ahawas Thora (The Love of Torah) in 1912. Halberstam devotedly fought against deviations from the tradition, even the minor ones. In Galicia he was regarded as an outstanding expert in the Jewish law and many orthodox rabbis asked him for advice. The Hasidic community in Biala was well organized and deeply rooted in their forefathers’ tradition, despite the geographical proximity of the influence of German liberal Jews.

After the end of World War I, Biala returned to the Second Polish Republic and became part of the Kraków Voivodeship.

In 1934, the official Jewish community came to change the Liturgy from Ashkenazi to Sephardic. The change was made by rabbi Dr. Samuel Hirschfeld, who was the leader of the Silesian Mizrachi (religious Zionism). Rabbi Hirschfeld said: We Jews, Zionists, are very inconsistent. We miss our old homeland Erez Israel. We build synagogues in the oriental style, we write books and poems in which we miss the smell of oriental fruits and spices. We delight in oriental music and the ancient Hebrew language. But in our synagogues we still have the German-Ashkenazi liturgy. It is not consistent. If we approach our Oriental sources, we must accept the Sephardic liturgy that is closer to our roots.

In 1938 in Biala there were 25.867 inhabitants, of which 3.977 were Jews, which constituted 15,4% of the whole population.

The most important official rabbis were: Dr. Nathan Glaser (1878–1914), Dr. Abraham Mark (1918–1926), Dr. Samuel Hirschfeld (1926–1939). The most important orthodox rabbi was Aron Halberstam from Sanz Hasidic dynasty.

== The first Jewish sports club in Europe ==
In 1936 the local Jewish sport organization Maccabi, organized the official celebration of 40th anniversary of its creation. Therefore, it would seem that the association was established in 1896 (Israelitische Turnverein) and Dr. Filip Türk wrote in Jewish newspaper “Tygodnik Żydowski” that The association must be credited with the historical merit, as it was the first Jewish gymnastic association in Europe to pave the way for the physical regeneration of Polish Jews. Among the patrons of the celebrations we should mention the president of the Global Makkabi Union, Alfred Mond, 1st Baron Melchett, and the president of the Makabi Union in Poland, the member of parliament Henryk Rosmarin. Modern literature on the subject suggests that the first Jewish sports association, Gymnastieken Athletiekvereeniging Attila, was established in April 1898 in Groningen. The second one, Zionistischer Turnverein Makabi, was set up in Philippopel (Bulgaria) in June 1898 and third one was Israelitischer Turnverein created in Bielsko in December the same year. Although the exact date is not certain, the indisputable Bielsko pioneers of Jewish sport made the local maskilim proud. In the statute the association formulated its objective as promoting gymnastic exercise and intense sports activity. After 1918 the association was renamed as Bielitz-Bialaer Jüdischer Turnverein (Bielsko-Biała Jewish Gymnastic Association). In 1925 the club was again renamed as the Bielsko-Biala Jewish Gymnastic and Sports Association Maccabi. The seat of the club was located in Bielsko, in Kolejowa street 21 (today Barlickiego). Although the name and address referred specifically to Bielsko, the association also attracted Jews from Biała. Jewish sportsmen in Bielsko-Biała mainly played football, swimming, water polo, gymnastics, mountaineering and mountain skiing. In 1929 the first Jewish mountain chalet in the world was built here.

== The Holocaust ==
Nazi Germany occupied the Bielsko on September 3, 1939. Over 50% of Jews fled the city from 1 to 3 September to the East of Poland to Kraków, Lviv and the surrounding area. They wanted to wait there for the end of the war. However, on September 17, 1939, was Soviet invasion of Poland. This was the reason for the tragedy of many Bielsko Jews. Most of them were progressive Austrian Jews who spoke only German and they were opponents of the communist ideology. This was suspicious of the Soviet NKVD and many of them were killed or imprisoned by the Soviets in Siberia. This is how the rabbi of Bielsko, Dr. Markus Steiner, died who did not look like an Orthodox Jew and knew only German. The Russians will not believe that he is a rabbi from Poland and sent to Siberia, unfortunately he died in a train wagon and he was thrown out on the way to the forest. The city of Biała was named Bielitz Ost and incorporated into Bielitz (Bielsko). In Bielitz Ost, the German Nazi authorities organized a ghetto. In the spring of 1942 the ghetto was liquidated and the Jews were resettled to the central Silesian ghetto in Sosnowiec and murdered in Auschwitz concentration camp. The last Jews from Bielitz were displaced in spring of 1942 and only about 30 families from mixed marriages (Mischling) remained in the city. After the war, 3,500 Jews were registered in the Jewish Committee in Bielsko between February 1945 and 1950. There were also sick Jewish prisoners from the Auschwitz camp liberated in January 1945. Relations and letters have been preserved in which the Jews mentioned that the city after the war was friendly and safe for Jews. A large Jewish Orphanage operated in the city.

== Current activity ==
Jewish Community of Bielsko-Biała is a member of Union of Jewish Religious Communities in Poland. Currently it brings together has several dozen members. The Community has active house of prayer in its headquarters. Meetings are held during Jewish holidays and important events. The headquarters also has Salomon Halberstam Library and an archive. There is also an active Chevra Lomdei Mishnayot synagogue in Oświęcim belonging to Auschwitz Jewish Center. The Jewish Community of Bielsko-Biała regained the synagogue from the Polish State for restoration and donated it to Auschwitz Jewish Center for its statutory purposes. The Community takes care of Jewish cemeteries in: Bielsko-Biała (the only one still functioning), Andrychów, Cieszyn (old and new), Kęty, Milówka, Oświęcim, Skoczów, Ustroń, Wadowice, Zator and Żywiec. Every year, the commune organizes many meetings, lectures, tours, concerts related to the history and culture of Jews in its area.

== Notable Jews from Bielsko-Biała ==
- Shlomo Avineri - political scientist
- Leonard Bloomfield - linguist, son of Siegmund Blumenfeld from Bielsko
- Maurice Bloomfield - was a Bielsko-born American philologist and Sanskrit scholar
- Heinrich Conried - theatrical manager and director of the Metropolitan Opera in New York City
- Ralph Erwin - originally Erwin Vogl, composer of a number of film scores
- Joseph Finger - architect, bringing modern architecture to Texas
- Max Friedländer - journalist
- Roman Frister - journalist
- Siegmund Glücksmann - politician
- Hermann Zvi Guttmann - architect
- Karl Guttmann - director of the theater in Amsterdam
- Solomon Joachim Halberstam - scholar and author
- Kitty Hart-Moxon - author
- Hugo Huppert - poet, translator and writer
- Uri Huppert - advocate, author
- Amalia Krieger - the first female photographer in Galicia
- Adolf Kurrein - rabbi, Zionistic activist
- Maria Kuryluk - originally Miriam Kohany, poet, writer, translator, pianist
- Selma Kurz - operatic soprano known for her brilliant coloratura technique
- Saul Scheidlinger Ph.D. - psychoterapist
- Aleksander Marten - actor, director, pioneer of Jewish cinematography, he made the first film in Yiddish with sound
- Nathan Michnik - rabbi of Congregation Beth Israel, Woodville, MS
- Bernhard Münz - philosopher and librarian
- Leo Nachtlicht - architekt
- Artur Schnabel - pianist
- Louis Schwitzer - engineer
- Jan Smeterlin - originally Schmetterling, pianist
- Christopher Tugendhat, Baron Tugendhat - politician, business man, company director, journalist and author
- Josef Unger - architect
- Gerda Weissmann Klein - author, Presidential Medal of Freedom recipients
- Sigmund Zeisler - known for his defense of radicals in Chicago in the 1880

== See also ==
- History of the Jews in Austria
- History of the Jews in Poland
- Galician Jews
- History of Silesia

== Bibliography ==
- Proszyk, Jacek (2018). History of the first B'nei B'rith Jewish Humanitarian Association in the Austro-Hungarian Empire. "Austria – Ezra" B'nei B'rith Bielitz (Bielsko) 1889-1938 (PDF). Bielsko-Biala, Poland: Passio Creatio Society. ISBN 978-83-943384-1-1.
- Proszyk, Jacek (2018). Aron Halberstam and Hasidim in Biala (Galicia) (PDF). Bielsko-Biala, Poland: Passio Creatio Society. ISBN 978-83-943384-0-4.
- Proszyk, Jacek (2015). 150 lat Gminy Wyznaniowej Żydowskiej w Bielsku (150 years of the Jewish Religious Community in Bielsko). Bielsko-Biala, Poland. ISBN 978-83-942613-2-0.
- Proszyk, Jacek (2014). The history of Jews in Bielsko (Bielitz) and Biala between 17th century and 1939. Liberals, Zionists and Orthodox Jews on the border of Galicia and Austrian Silesia. Jaworze, Poland: Haskala. ISBN 978-83-936155-2-0.
- Proszyk, Jacek (2009). Salomon Joachim Halberstamm bibliofil. Bielsko-Biała, Poland: G.M.Elzewir. ISBN 978-83-917046-5-3.
- Proszyk, Jacek (2002). Cmentarz żydowski w Bielsku-Białej (The Jewish Cemetery in Bielsko-Biala). Bielsko-Biała, Poland: Urząd Miejski w Bielsku-Białej. ISBN 978-83-908913-1-6.
- Spyra, Janusz (2009). Żydowskie gminy wyznaniowe na Śląsku Austriackim 1742-1918. Cieszyn: Muzeum Śląskie. ISBN 978-83-60353-76-9.
- Spyra, Janusz (2015). Biografický slovník rabínů rakouského Slezska. Ostrava: Ostravská univerzita. ISBN 978-80-7464-797-0.
