= Irene Jessner =

American opera singer and voice teacher

Irene Jessner (August 28, 1901 – January 10, 1994) was an Austrian-born American soprano and music educator. She began her opera career in Europe in 1930. From 1936 to 1952 she was a principal soprano at the Metropolitan Opera. She became a naturalized American citizen in 1938. While she was particularly associated with the operas of Richard Strauss and Richard Wagner, her repertoire also encompassed works from the Italian and French opera literature. Her most celebrated roles were Chrysthomenis in Elektra, the Marschallin in Der Rosenkavalier, and Sieglinde in Die Walküre; all parts which she recorded and which she performed both at the Metropolitan Opera and as a guest artist with other organizations. She was a celebrated voice teacher at the University of Toronto from 1952 until her retirement in 1986. She also taught on the faculty of The Royal Conservatory of Music in the 1950s. Several of her pupils had successful careers, including Teresa Stratas. Canadian musicologist Carl Morey described her as "one of the few truly outstanding voice teachers in Canada.”

== Early life, education, and career in Europe ==
The daughter of Arthur and Jenny Jellinek, Irene Jessner was born with the name Irene Jellinek in Vienna, Austria on 28 August 1901. Her father was a prominent physician in Vienna and her mother was the sister of novelist Jakob Wassermann. She originally trained as a pianist at the Wiener Musikakademie (also known as the Vienna Conservatory and now the University of Music and Performing Arts Vienna). She then studied singing with Viktor Fuchs at the Neues Wiener Konservatorium.

Jessner made her professional opera debut in 1930 at the Krušnohorské Theatre in Teplice as Elsa in Richard Wagner's Lohengrin. In 1931 she was on the roster of principal artists at the New German Theatre in Prague (now the Prague State Opera). In her early career she had particular success in Czechoslovakia in the title role of Giuseppe Verdi's Aida.

Following her work in Prague, Jessner worked as a guest artist with the Bavarian State Opera and the National Theatre Brno. She also toured Europe in operas and musicals.

== Metropolitan Opera ==
Jessner came to the United States after being invited by Edward Johnson to become a principal artist at to the Metropolitan Opera ("the Met"). She became a naturalized American citizen on July 8, 1938, and was committed to the Met for sixteen consecutive seasons. She made her debut at the Metropolitan Opera House on December 21, 1936 as Ortlinde in Wagner's Die Walküre. Later that week she portrayed Hansel to Queena Mario's Gretel in Engelbert Humperdinck's Hansel and Gretel.

Other roles Jessner performed with the Met included Alice Ford in Falstaff, Amelia in Simon Boccanegra, Chrysothemis in Richard Strauss's Elektra, Countess Almaviva in The Marriage of Figaro (on tour to Boston), Desdemona in Otello, Donna Elvira in Don Giovanni, Elsa in Lohengrin, Elisabeth in Tannhäuser, Eurudice in Orfeo ed Euridice, Eva in Die Meistersinger von Nürnberg, the First Lady in The Magic Flute, a Flower Maiden in Parsifal, Freia in Das Rheingold, the Marschallin in Der Rosenkavalier, Sieglinde in Die Walküre, and the title role in Tosca. Her final performance with the Met was on February 1, 1952 as Gutrune in Götterdämmerung.

While working at the Met, Jessner married Arthur Ivan de Norby on March 15, 1941 in Manhattan.

== Other performances ==
Jessner had a reputation as an outstanding performer in the operas of Richard Strauss, and was particularly celebrated in the roles of Chrysthomenis in Elektra and the Marschallin in Der Rosenkavalier. She sang both of these parts as a guest artist in multiple places. She performed Chrysthomenis at Los Angeles's Shrine Auditorium (1938), the San Francisco Opera (1938, with Rose Pauly in the title role and Kerstin Thorborg as Klytaemnestra), the Chicago Symphony Orchestra (1947), and in a television version of Elektra made with the NBC Opera Theatre in 1949. She performed the Marschillan at the Chicago Auditorium (1946), the Cincinnati Opera (1948) and the New York City Opera (1949).

Jessner's other roles at the San Francisco Opera included Eva in Die Meistersinger von Nürnberg (1938, with Friedrich Schorr as Hans Sachs), and the roles of Sieglinde in Die Walküre and Alice Ford in Falstaff which she performed with the company during World War II. In 1939 she portrayed Sieglinde with the Saint Louis Grand Opera. In 1942 she appeared as a guest artist in a season of operas at the Teatro Colón; performing in operas by Mozart and Wagner. In 1946 she gave a recital of German lieder at The Town Hall. In 1949 she performed at the Ravinia Festival with the Chicago Symphony Orchestra.

== Recordings ==
Jessner made a complete recording of the role of Chrysothemis in Richard Strauss's Elektra with the New York Philharmonic which was released in 1949 by Columbia Records. Also for Columbia, she recorded the third act of Die Walküre with the Metropolitan Opera chorus and orchestra in 1946; singing the roles of both Sieglinde and Ortlinde. She also recorded songs by Nikolai Rimsky-Korsakov and Pyotr Ilyich Tchaikovsky for RCA Victor. Some of her recordings that were originally made for the Metropolitan Opera radio broadcasts have become available on disc, including Met performances of Elektra and Der Rosenkavalier.

== Teaching career and later life ==
Jessner moved to Canada after being appointed to the faculty of The Royal Conservatory of Music in the early 1950s. Subsequently she joined the voice faculty of the University of Toronto (UT) in 1952. There she had a lengthy career as celebrated voice teacher that lasted more than three decades. Many of her students went on to have successful performance careers; including tenors Léonard Bilodeau and Mark DuBois; bass-baritone Maurice Brown; contralto Portia White; and sopranos Mary Lou Fallis, Lois McDonall, Roxolana Roslak, Teresa Stratas, Lilian Sukis, Heather Thomson, Riki Turofsky, and Jeannette Zarou. She retired at the end of the 1985-1986 academic year.

In honor of Jessner's retirement, a special gala concert was given by her former voice students on 3 November 1986 at the UT. The UT music faculty established a music scholarship in her name. Following the death of her husband, Arthur de Nordy, she lived in the residence of her former student, Mark DuBois.

Jessner died on January 10, 1994 in Toronto, Ontario.
