= Summer Festival =

Summer Festival may refer to:

- Summer Festival (TV series)
- Ann Arbor Summer Festival
- Dubrovnik Summer Festival
- Ljubljana Summer Festival
- Ohrid Summer Festival
- Quebec City Summer Festival
- Skopje Summer Festival
- Summer Festival, Albania
- Summer Sonic Festival
- Tokyo Summer Festival
