= Bielsko =

Until 1950 an independent town situated in Cieszyn Silesia, Poland

Coordinates: 49°48′50.353″N 19°1′33.42″E

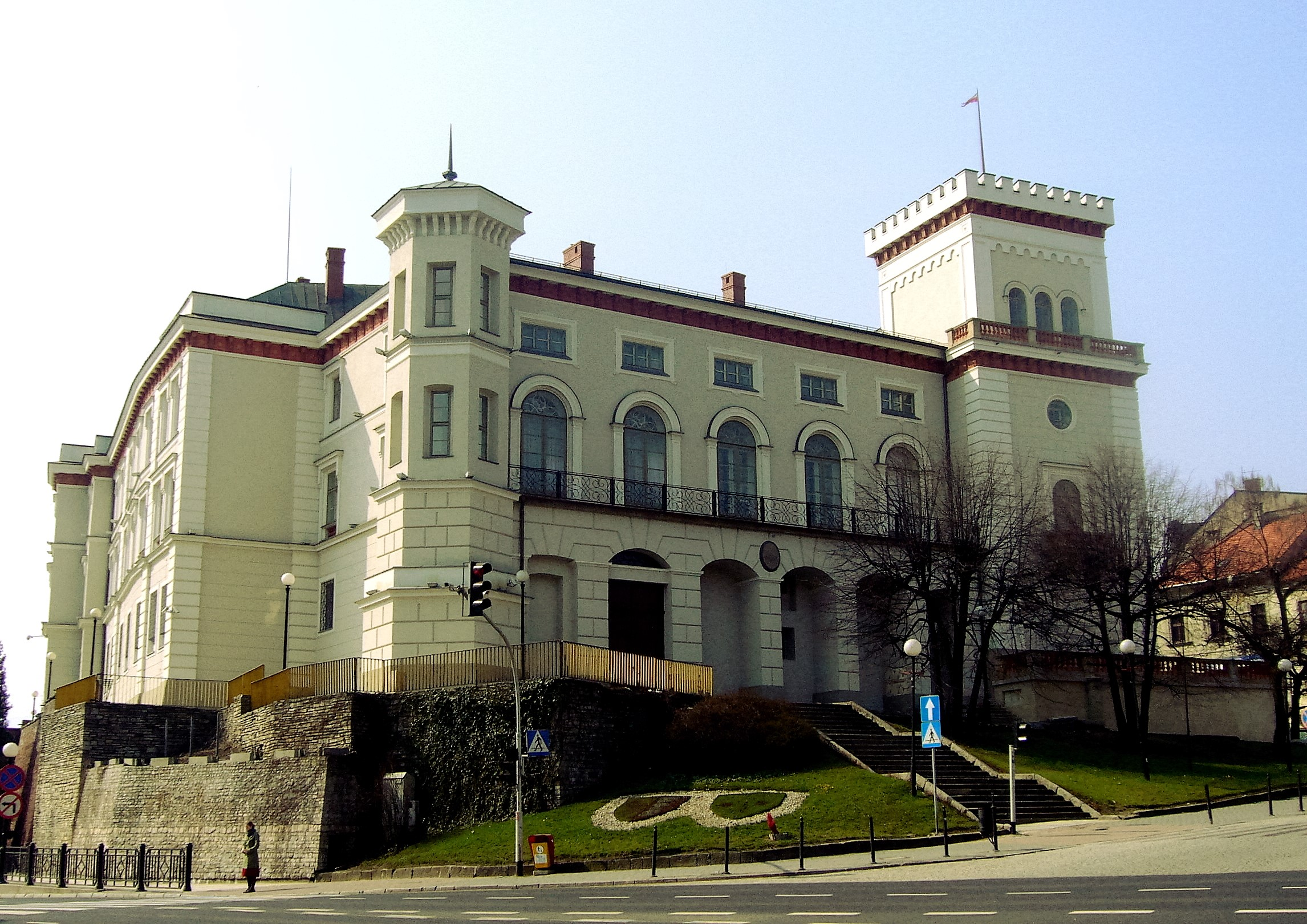
Sułkowski family castle in Bielsko

Bielsko [ˈbjɛlskɔ] (German: Bielitz, Czech: Bílsko) was until 1950 an independent town situated in Cieszyn Silesia, Poland. In 1951 it was joined with Biała Krakowska to form the new town of Bielsko-Biała. Bielsko constitutes the western part of that town.

Bielsko was founded by the Cieszyn Piast dukes in the late 13th century on the grounds of village later called Stare Bielsko (Old Bielsko), on the Biała River. It was first mentioned in a written document in 1312. Originally settled by Germans, it became the largest German-language center (Deutsche Sprachinsel Bielitz) in the Duchy of Teschen, and remained so until the end of World War II. In 1572 it gained autonomy as the Duchy (State) of Bielsko. During the 18th century a rapid development of textile industry occurred, and at the beginning of the 19th century more than 500 weavers worked in the town. After the 1920 division of Cieszyn Silesia between Poland and Czechoslovakia it became, despite the protests of local Germans, a part of Poland.

According to the Austrian census of 1910 the town had 18,568 inhabitants. The census asked people for their native language: 15,144 (84.3%) were German-speaking, 2,568 (14.3%) were Polish-speaking and 136 (0.7%) were Czech-speaking. Jews were not allowed to declare Yiddish, and most of them thus declared German as their native language. The most populous religious groups were Roman Catholics with 10,378 (55.9%), followed by Protestants with 4,955 (26.7%) and the Jews with 3,024 (16.3%). The vast majority of the Jews were exterminated by Nazis during World War II, and the German population was expelled by the Soviets after the war under the terms demanded by Stalin at the Potsdam Conference.

== Notable people ==
- Three well-known Holocaust survivors from Bielsko are Kitty Hart-Moxon, Roman Frister and Gerda Weissmann Klein. All three have written autobiographies and other works about their experiences during the Second World War.
- Shlomo Avineri, an Israeli political scientist
- The ancestors of the British peer Christopher Tugendhat, Baron Tugendhat, are also from what was Bielitz.
- Gustav Gyula Geyer (1828–1900), Hungarian educator and entomologist
- Maurice Bloomfield, an American linguist
- Eduard Geyer (born 1944), German football manager

== See also ==
- Bielsko Synagogue
- Jews in Bielsko-Biała
