= Sandor Vandor (Holocaust survivor) =

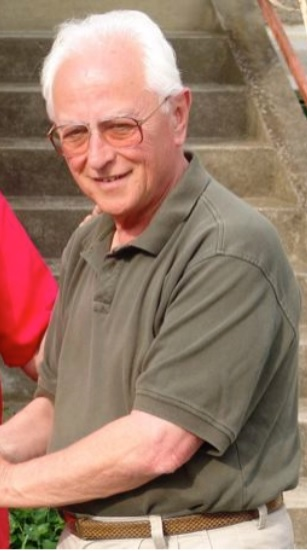

Sandor Vandor is a Holocaust survivor of Hungarian nationality who was incarcerated at the Sankt Anna am Aigen Labour Camp in Austria. His wife Anna along with his mother and sister were sent to Auschwitz on the Hungarian transports in 1944 where his mother was killed in the gas chambers on arrival. In a 2018 interview with researcher Hannah Wilson from the Auschwitz Study Group, Sandor gave his testimony explaining how he survived the camp with the help of the people of Sankt Anna am Aigen.
