= Auschwitz Study Group =

The Auschwitz Study Group (ASG) are a team of collective researchers and archivists founded by English researcher Michael Challoner. The ASG have spent several years studying all facets and complexities of Auschwitz and post war Oświęcim, often providing original work for media and production companies.

Recent work includes providing research for the German radio channel Radioshow Kulturradio - "Frau Baruch" and providing archival assistance for Director Jonathan Glazer's upcoming film set in Auschwitz during the Holocaust. The ASG have also provided research and materials for the Daily Mail article on the Brothels of Auschwitz, as well as contributing testimonies and materials for an article on the Solahütte SS retreat for the English language spoken Polish News Agency, The First News. In November 2018, The First News also worked with the ASG to publish an article commemorating the anniversary of the first execution of Auschwitz.

In 2017, the Auschwitz Study Group researched the fate of women imprisoned at the Rajsko sub-camp of Auschwitz for British Holocaust organisation, the Lake District Holocaust Project. The names of many of the women were published on the Auschwitz Study Group's website. In the same year, the late architect and researcher, Marek Rawecki who was commissioned by UNESCO to present details of the protection zone of the Auschwitz-Birkenau contributed an essay on the 'Forgotten Auschwitz' to the Auschwitz Study Group's website.

As of 2017, the Group became partners of the Luftschutz-Splitterschutzzelle Bunkers Permanent Exhibition in Chełmek, the site of the former Chelmek Auschwitz sub-camp, providing archival and historical information.

In 2018, a short story was written by the Group for Holocaust survivor, Agnes Grunwald-Spiers' book, 'Women's Experience In The Holocaust'. Other notable interviews from the ASG include Kitty Hart-Moxon, OBE in which she briefly talks about Denis Avey who claimed to have escaped from Auschwitz, and Sandor Vandor, a Holocaust survivor and Hungarian native who survived the Sankt Anna Am Aigen Labour Camp.
