= Jeannette Zarou =

Palestinian-born Canadian soprano (born 1942)

- تتمة جانيت
- Born: 1942 (age 83–84); Ramallah, West Bank
- Education: University of Toronto
- Occupations: Classical soprano; Academic teacher
- Organizations: Canadian Opera Company; Deutsche Oper am Rhein; Robert Schumann Hochschule

Jeannette Zarou (Arabic: تتمة جانيت; born 1942, Ramallah) is a Palestinian-born Canadian soprano. She was a lyric soprano with the Canadian Opera Company and the Deutsche Oper am Rhein, and has worked as an academic voice teacher at the Robert Schumann Hochschule in Düsseldorf.

== Career ==
Zarou moved to Corner Brook, Newfoundland, in 1947, where she studied at the University of Toronto in 1961, as a student of Irene Jessner. In 1964, she debuted at the Canadian Opera Company (COC) as a priestess in Verdi's Aida. In 1964, she sang the title role in the premiere of Healey Willan's opera Deirdre by the University's Opera Division. A review noted:

Jeannette Zarou, truly sympathetic in the title role, possessed a mellow lyric soprano voice that led to a distinguished career in Germany over the next thirty years.

With the Canadian Opera Company, she performed the roles of Liù in Puccini's Turandot (1965), Micaela in Bizet's Carmen (1966), Marguerite in Gounod's Faust (1970), Marzelline in Beethoven's Fidelio (1973) and Mimi in Puccini's La bohème (1976).

From 1967 to 1974 she was a lyric soprano at the Deutsche Oper am Rhein in Düsseldorf and performed with singers Bernd Weikl, Rene Kollo, Peter Hofmann, Manfred Jung and Paul Frey. She also made guest appearances at opera houses in Amsterdam, Berlin, the Hamburg State Opera, Cologne Opera, Vienna and Staatstheater Wiesbaden. She performed the title role in Ariadne auf Naxos by Richard Strauss at the Stratford Festival in 1975, conducted by Raffi Armenian and directed by Jan Rubes.

Zarou was also active as a concert singer. At the Expo 67, she sang the soprano part in Mahler's Fourth Symphony with the New York Philharmonic Orchestra, conducted by Leonard Bernstein. She sang the soprano solo in Beethoven's Ninth Symphony with the Bach-Chor Bonn in 1977.

Zarou has been a professor of voice at the Robert Schumann Hochschule in Düsseldorf. One of her notable students was Maria Radner, a contralto who appeared in international operas including the Metropolitan Opera in 2012 in Götterdämmerung, which was part of the opera's documentary Wagner's Dream.
