= Adolf Kurrein =

Czech-Austrian rabbi and Zionist activist

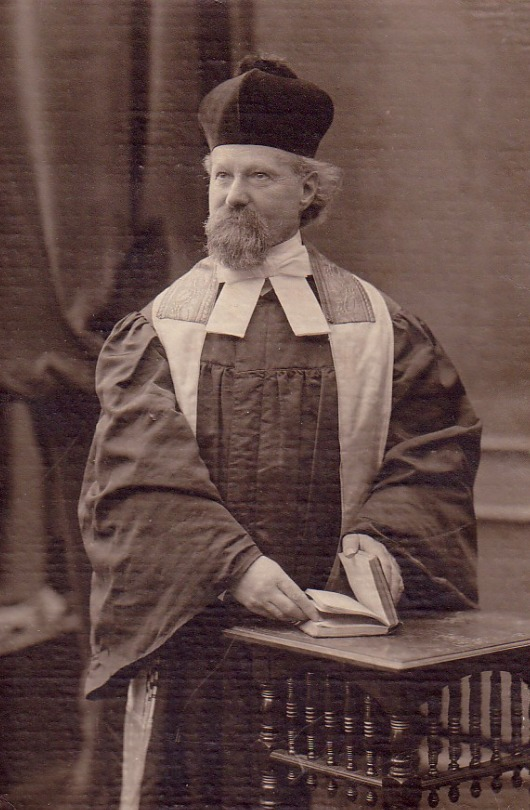
Portrait of Adolf Kurrein

Adolf Kurrein (January 28, 1846 – October 23, 1919) was a Czech-Austrian rabbi and Zionist activist.

== Early life ==
Adolf Kurrein was born in Třebíč, now part of the Czech Republic. Losing his father, Markus Maharam Kurrein, when he was two years old, Adolf grew up with his sister Katharina and his mother Theresia (Telze) née Grünberger, a seamstress. At age 15, he moved to Brno (now in the Czech Republic), where he graduated in 1866. He then went to Vienna, receiving his doctorate from the University of Vienna.

== Career ==
Kurrein served as rabbi of St. Pölten (now in Austria) starting 1872, of Linz (Austria) from 1876 to 1882, and of Bielsko-Biała (now in Poland) from 1882 to 1888. Then, he became rabbi of Teplice (now in the Czech Republic).

Kurrein edited the monthly Jüdische Chronik from 1894 to 1896 with Simon Stern and Ignaz Ziegler and from 1897 to 1902 alone. Under his guidance, Jüdische Chronik advocated Zionism.

He authored and co-authored articles for the Jewish Encyclopedia.

== Writings ==
Kurrein was a disciple of Adolf Jellinek. Besides several collections of sermons — entitled Maggid Mereshit (1880), Maggid le-Adam (1882), and Patriarchenbilder: I., Abraham (1893) — he wrote the following pamphlets:

- "Die Frau im Jüdischen Volke" (1885; 2d ed., Bilin, 1901)
- "Traum und Wahrheit", a biography of Joseph (1887)
- "Arbeit und Arbeiter" (1890)
- "Die Sociale Frage im Judentume" (1890)
- "Die Pflichten des Besitzes" (1892)
- "Der Friede" (1892)
- "Das Kaddisch" (1896)
- "Der Grabstein" (1897)
- "Judäa und Rom" (1898)
- "Bibel, Heidentum, und Heidenbekehrung" (1899; 2d. ed., 1901)
- "Brauchen die Juden Christenblut?" (1900)
- "Lichtstrahlen aus den Reden Jellinek's", prepared by him for Jellinek's 70th birthday

== Family ==
In 1877 Kurrein married Jessie Loewe, daughter of Louis Loewe. Two of their five children were murdered at Auschwitz. His son Viktor Kurrein (1881–1974) was also a rabbi in Linz until he fled to England in 1938.
