= Riki Turofsky =

Canadian opera singer

Riki Turofsky (born 20 February 1944 in Toronto) is a Canadian concert and opera soprano, broadcaster, and video producer. She has sung leading roles with opera companies in Canada, the United States, and Europe, and has performed on the concert stage with major ensembles throughout North America. In 1978 she expanded her career into broadcasting as a host for the Canadian Broadcasting Corporation program Summer Festival. She has since appeared as a host on numerous programs for the CBC and the CTV Television Network. She also owns and operates the company Riki Productions which produces arts related programing for Canadian television.

== Career ==
Born in Toronto, Turofsky is the daughter of sports photographer Louis "Lou" Turofsky (1892 - 1959) and the niece of photographer Nathan "Nat" Turofsky (1895 – 1956). She studied with the British Columbia Opera Ensemble before making her debut in 1967 as Gretel in Humperdinck's Hansel and Gretel. After touring Canada with that production, she became a member of the Merola Opera Program at the San Francisco Opera. She also attended master classes at the Music Academy of the West where she was a pupil of Lotte Lehmann and Martial Singher. From 1968 to 1970 she was graduate student in the opera program at the University of Toronto under soprano Irene Jessner where she earned a degree in opera performance.

In 1969 Turofsky made her debut with the Canadian Opera Company (COC) as Fifi in Die Fledermaus. The following year she made her debut with the Vancouver Opera as Oscar in Verdi's Un Ballo in Maschera and made her first appearance in a leading role with the COC as Zerlina in Mozart's Don Giovanni. In 1972 she made her debut with the New York City Opera as Frasquita in Bizet's Carmen and returned to the COC as Mussetta in La boheme. In 1973 she alternated in the role of Marie in La fille du régiment with Beverly Sills at the Houston Grand Opera. In 1975 she portrayed the Princess in Tibor Polgar's The Glove for CBC Television. In 1976 she portrayed Curley's Wife in Carlisle Floyd's Of Mice and Men at the Dutch National Opera. In 1978 she appeared at Festival Ottawa as Titania in Britten's A Midsummer Night's Dream, and returned to the COC as Countess Almaviva in The Marriage of Figaro and Violetta in La traviata. In 1988 she created the role of Gloria in the world premiere of Sydney Hodkinson's St. Carmen of the Main at the Guelph Spring Festival.

On the concert stage Turofsky has appeared as a featured soloist in concerts with many of Canada's most important ensembles, including the Bach-Elgar Choir, the Festival Singers of Canada, the McGill Chamber Orchestra, the Toronto Mendelssohn Choir, the Toronto Symphony Orchestra, and the Winnipeg Symphony Orchestra among others. Composer R. Murray Schafer wrote his Hymn to Night specifically for her; which she sang for its premiere with the CJRT Orchestra in 1978 and recorded in 1979 with the CBC Vancouver Orchestra. In 1989 she performed another work written for her, Michael Conway Baker's Eve of the Garden, with the Hamilton Philharmonic. Her other recordings include the 1980 album Jade Eyes with guitarist Michael Laucke for Aquitaine Records, 1986 album Riki Turofsky sings Kurt Weill for Fanfare Records, and a 1988 music video of the song My Ship for the MuchMusic network.
