= Bohdan Chlíbec =

Czech poet and publisher

- Born: 12 March 1963 (age 62); Teplice, Czechoslovakia
- Occupation: poet

Bohdan Chlíbec (born 12 March 1963) is a Czech poet.

He lives in Prague since 1971. He works as a librarian at Clementinum. Collection of his poems under the title Zimní dvůr was awarded by the readers award at Lidové noviny in 2013.

A2 magazine listed this book in the Czech literary works after 1989, naming it as one of the most important Czech books in the thirty years since the Velvet Revolution.

== His works ==
- Zasněžený popel (Snow-covered ash), 1992
- Temná komora (Darkroom), 1998
- Zimní dvůr (Winter yard), 2013
- Krev burzy (Stock blood), 2019
