= Bielsko Synagogue =

Destroyed synagogue in Bielsko, Poland

- Polish: Synagoga w Bielsku
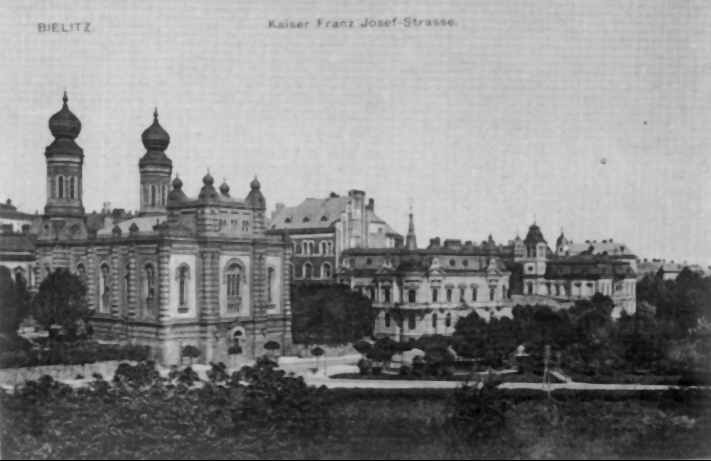
- The former synagogue in 1910

- Location of the destroyed synagogue in Silesian Voivodeship

Religion
- Affiliation: Modern Orthodox Judaism (former)
- Rite: Nusach Ashkenaz
- Ecclesiastical or organizational status: Synagogue (1881–1939)
- Status: Destroyed

Location
- Location: Kaiser Franz Josef Street, Bielsko, Cieszyn Silesia, Silesian Voivodeship
- Country: Poland
- Interactive map of Bielsko Synagogue
- Coordinates: 49°49′29″N 19°2′40″E

Architecture
- Architect: Karol Korn
- Type: Synagogue architecture
- Style: Moorish Revival; Romanesque Revival
- Groundbreaking: 1879
- Completed: 1881
- Destroyed: 13 September 1939

The Bielsko Synagogue (Polish: Synagoga w Bielsku) was a former Modern Orthodox Jewish congregation and synagogue, located in Bielsko, in Cieszyn Silesia, in the Silesian Voivodeship of Poland.

Designed by Karol Korn and completed in 1881 in the Moorish Revival and Romanesque Revival styles, the synagogue served as a house of prayer until World War II when it was destroyed by Nazis on 13 September 1939.

== See also ==
- History of the Jews in Poland
- List of active synagogues in Poland
