= Summer Festival (TV series) =

- Genre: Current affairs; Entertainment
- Country of origin: Canada
- Original language: English
- No. of seasons: 1

Production
- Running time: 60 minutes

Original release
- Network: CBC Television
- Release: 30 June – 5 September 1980

Summer Festival is a Canadian current affairs and entertainment television program that aired on CBC Television in 1980.

== Premise ==
This program featured various events throughout Canada such as a lobster festival in Prince Edward Island or Edmonton's Klondike Days. Various hosts were assigned for each Canadian region. On Monday episodes, Geoff Gray-Cobb of British Columbia provided astrology advice.

Summer Festival replaced The Bob McLean Show between June and September 1980. The executive producer for the program was Nigel Napier-Andrews, whom was also a producer on The Bob McLean Show.

== Regional hosts ==
- Edmonton: Jo Green
- Halifax: Beth Harrington
- Charlottetown: Amanda Hancox
- St. John's, Newfoundland: Shirley Newhook
- Toronto: Riki Turofsky
- Windsor, Ontario: Marilyn MacKay
- Winnipeg: Arvel Gray
- Vancouver: Debra Kaye

== Scheduling ==
This hour-long program was broadcast weekdays at 3:00 p.m. (Eastern time) from 30 June to 5 September 1980.
