= Gustav Gyula Geyer =

Hungarian educator and entomologist

Gustav Július Geyer (1828–1900) was a Hungarian educator and entomologist.
