= Krušnohorské Theatre =

Theatre in Teplice, Czech Republic

Coordinates: 50.6401°N 13.8281°E

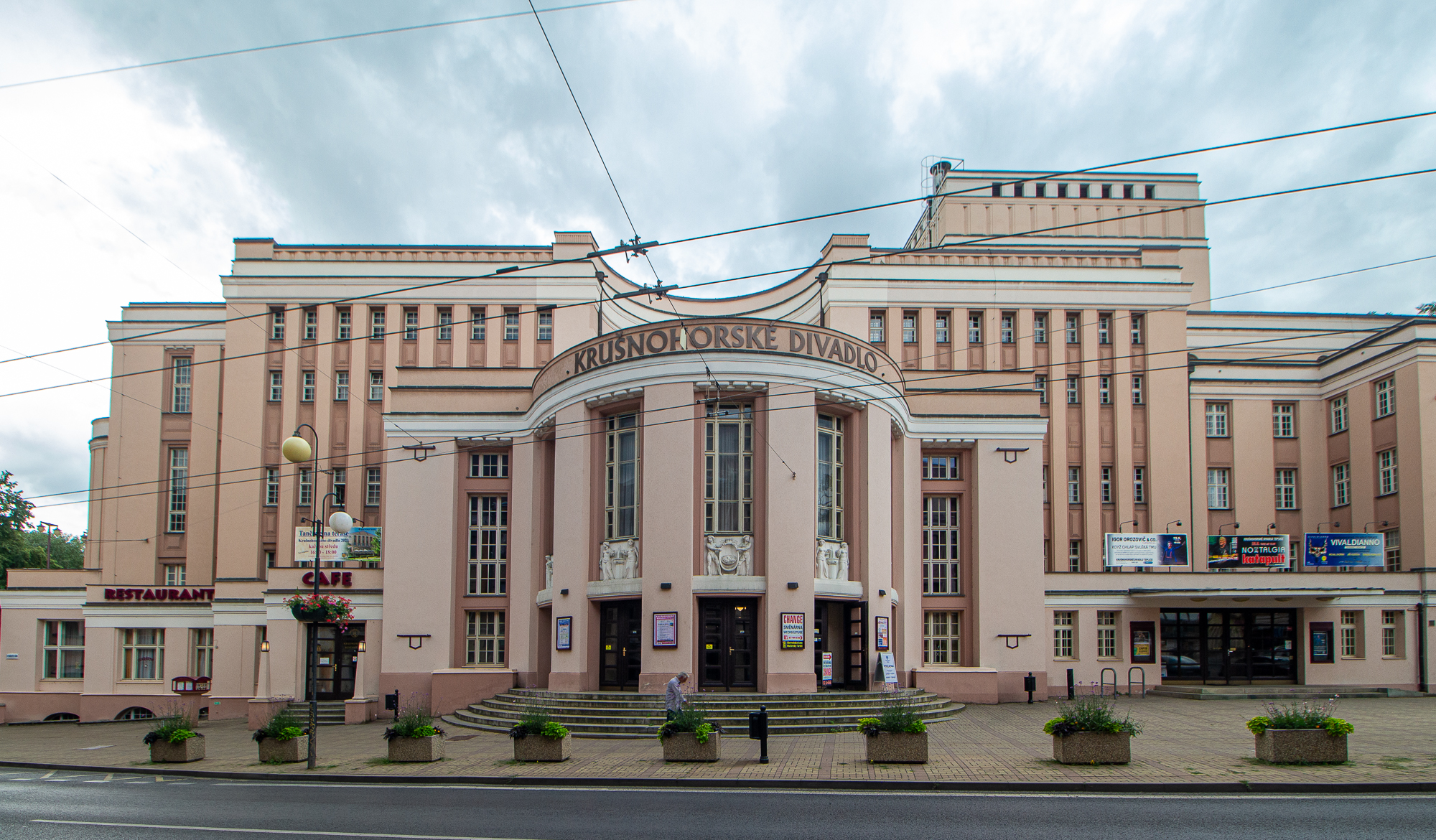
Krušnohorské Theatre

Krušnohorské Theatre (Czech: Krušnohorské divadlo) is a theatre in Teplice, Czech Republic. Built in the years 1921–1924, portions of the building became accessible for use in 1923. It serves as the city's main opera house and is also used as a venue for plays and concerts.
