= Teplice =

- Statutory city
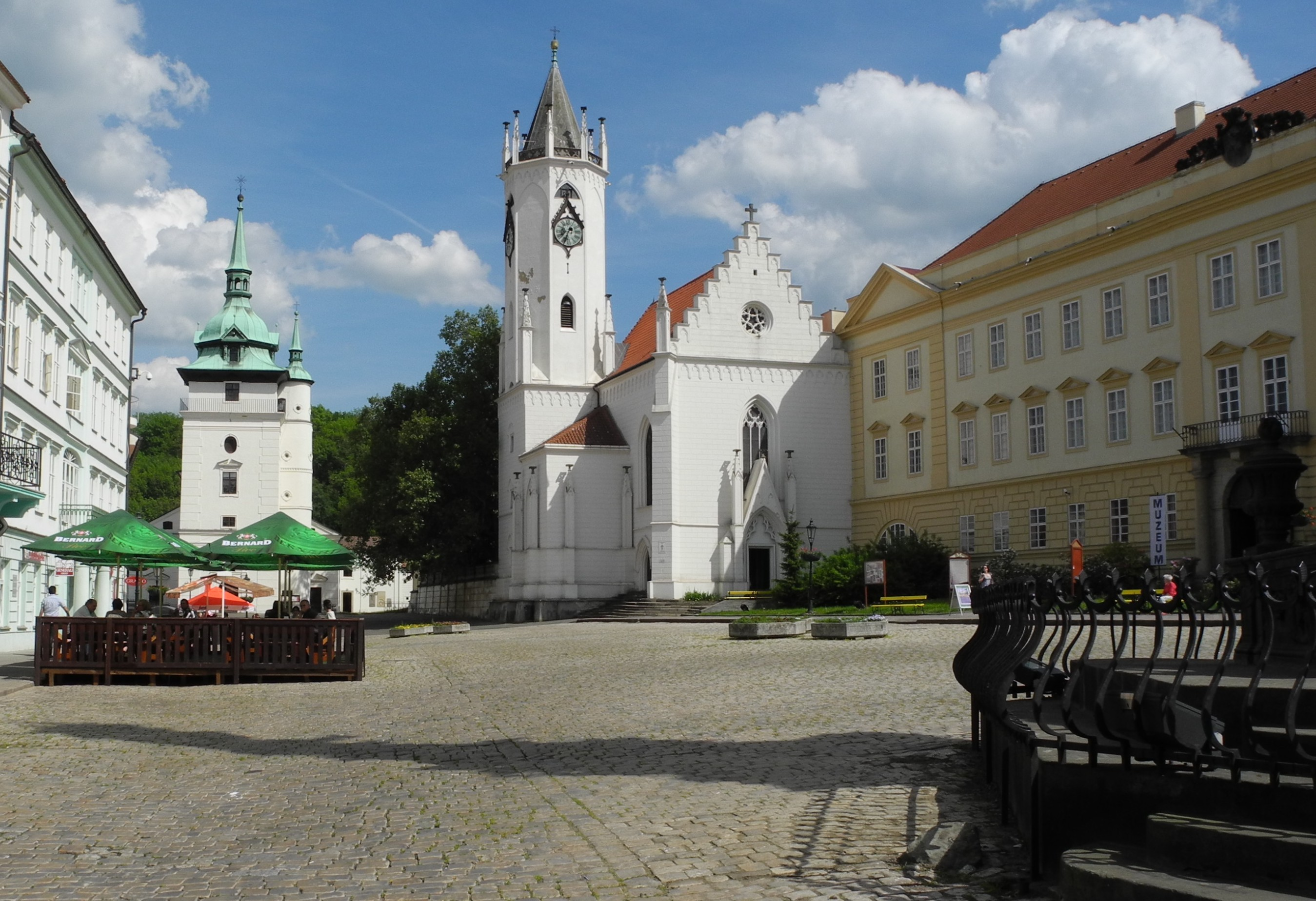
- Castle square with the Church of Saint John the Baptist

- Flag Coat of arms

- Location in the Czech Republic
- Coordinates: 50°38′40″N 13°49′55″E
- Country: Czech Republic
- Region: Ústí nad Labem
- District: Teplice
- First mentioned: 1154

Government
  - Mayor: Jiří Štábl (ANO 2011)

Area
  - Total: 23.78 km^{2} (9.18 sq mi)
- Elevation: 228 m (748 ft)

Population (2026-01-01)
  - Total: 50,856
  - Density: 2,139/km^{2} (5,539/sq mi)
- Time zone: UTC+1 (CET)
  - Summer (DST): UTC+2 (CEST)
- Postal code: 415 01
- Website: www.teplice.cz

Teplice (Czech pronunciation: [ˈtɛplɪtsɛ], until 1948 Teplice-Šanov; German: Teplitz, Teplitz-Schönau) is a city in the Ústí nad Labem Region of the Czech Republic. It has about 51,000 inhabitants. It is the most populous Czech spa town, followed by Karlovy Vary.

Teplice was first documented in 1154, when the oldest Czech spa was founded. The historic city centre is well preserved and is protected as an urban monument zone. The main landmark of the city is the Teplice Castle.

== Administrative division ==
Teplice consists of seven municipal parts (in brackets population according to the 2021 census):

- Teplice (19,441)
- Hudcov (651)
- Nová Ves (1,315)
- Prosetice (3,359)
- Řetenice (4,016)
- Sobědruhy (1,144)
- Trnovany (18,502)

== Etymology ==
Teplice is an Old Czech word meaning 'warm (hot) water'.

== Geography ==
Teplice is located about 14 kilometres (9 mi) west of Ústí nad Labem and 72 km (45 mi) northwest of Prague. The northern part of the municipal territory lies in the Most Basin and the southern part lies in the Central Bohemian Uplands. The highest point is the hill Doubravská hora at 393 m (1,289 ft) above sea level. The Bystřice Stream flows through the city. There are several small fishponds in the territory of Teplice.

== History ==
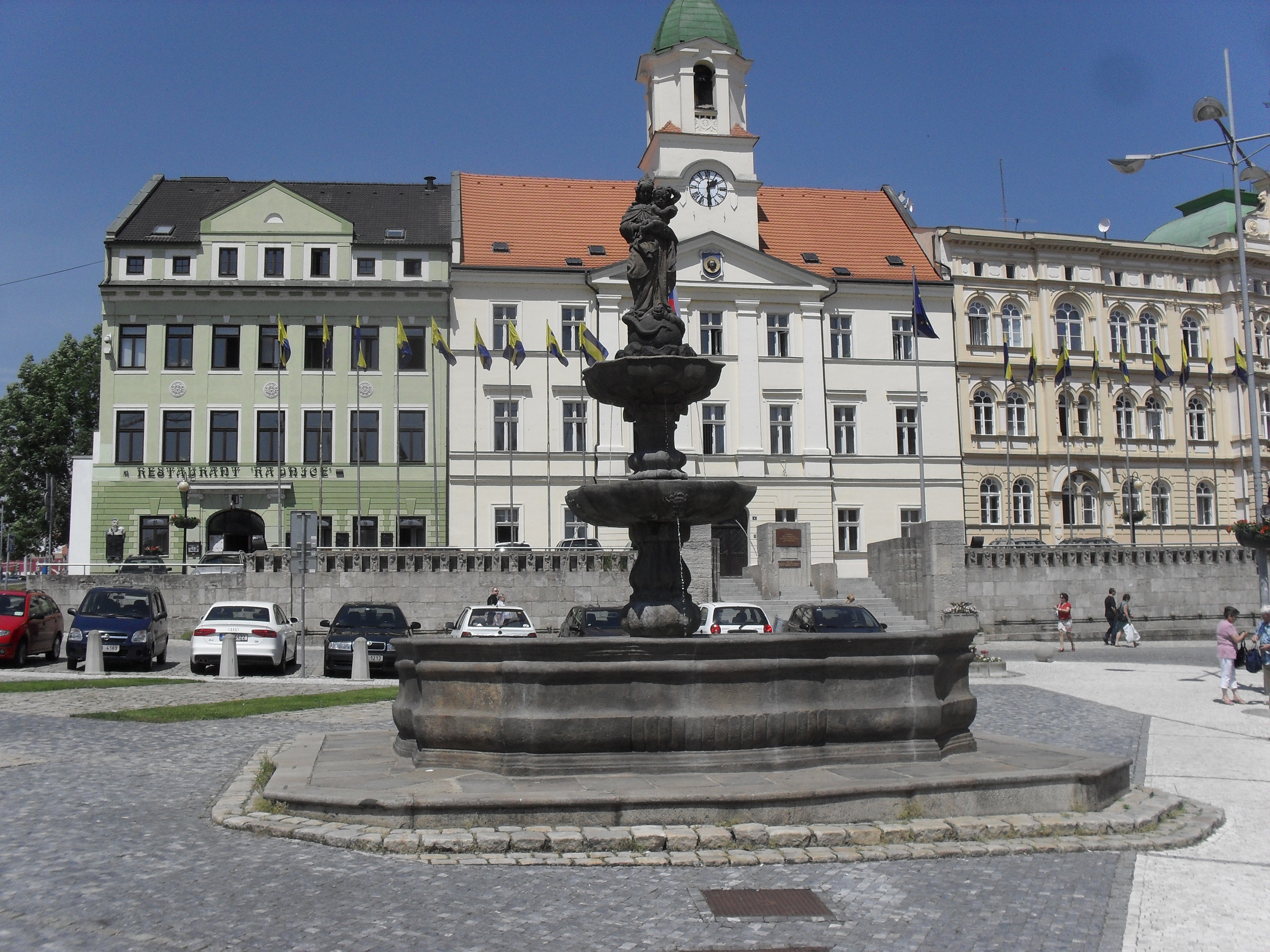
Fountain and the city hall

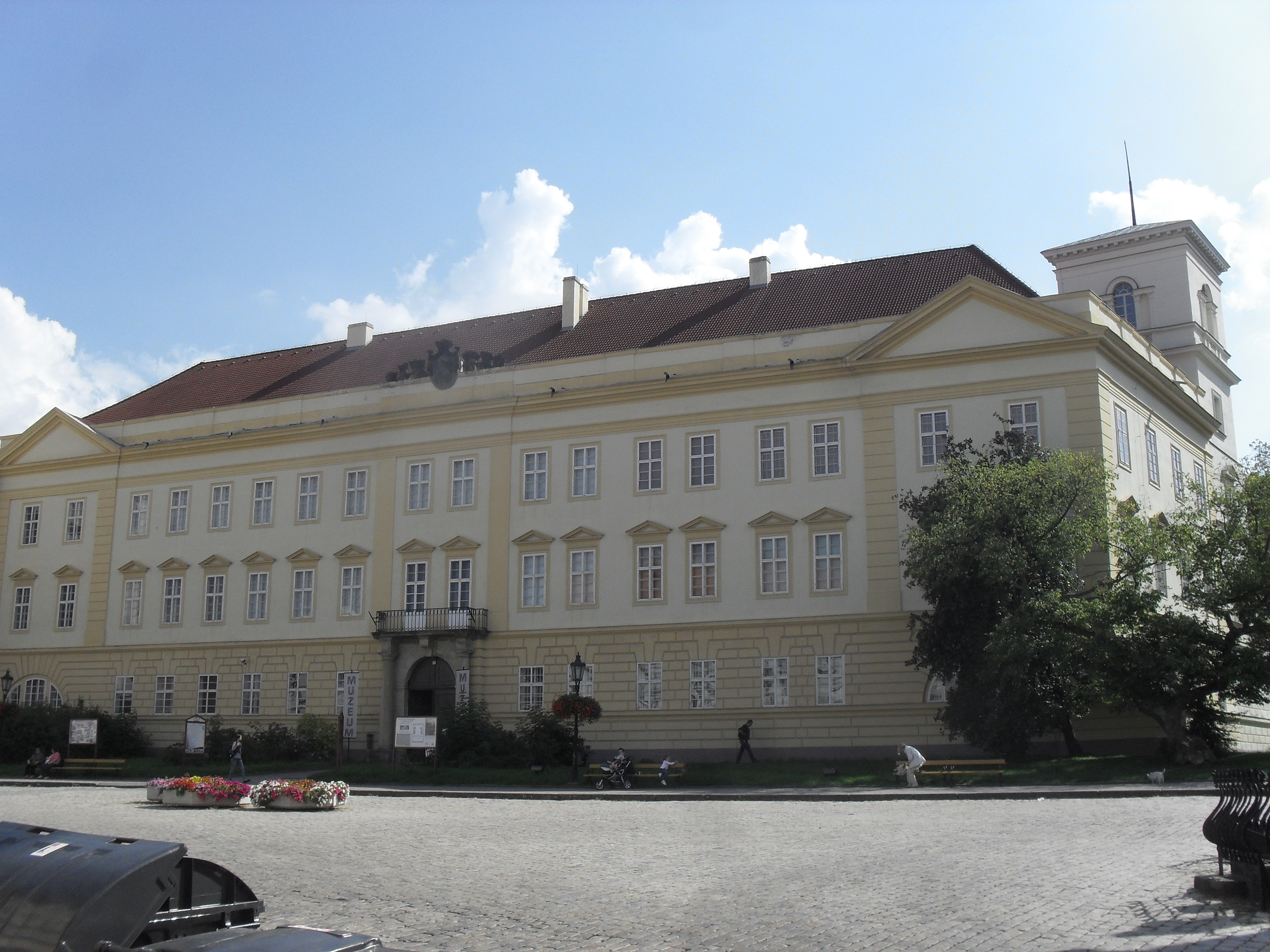
Teplice Castle

According to the 1541 Annales Bohemorum by chronicler Wenceslaus Hajek, the thermal springs are fabled to have been discovered as early as 762; however, the first authentic mention of the baths occurred in the 16th century. The settlement of Trnovany was first documented in a 1057 deed, while Teplice proper was first mentioned in 1154, when Judith of Thuringia, queen consort of King Vladislaus II of Bohemia, founded a Benedictine convent near the hot springs, the second in Bohemia. A fortified town arose around the monastery, which was destroyed in the course of the Hussite Wars after the 1426 Battle of Aussig. In the late 15th century, queen consort Joanna of Rožmitál, wife of King George of Poděbrady, had a castle erected on the ruins.

Teplice figures in the history of the Thirty Years' War (1618–1648), when it was a possession of the Protestant Bohemian noble Vilém Kinský, who was assassinated together with Generalissimo Albrecht von Wallenstein in Cheb in 1634. The Habsburg emperor Ferdinand II thereafter enfeoffed castle and town to his general Johann von Aldringen, who nevertheless was killed in battle in the same year, and Teplice fell to his sister Anna Maria von Clary-Aldringen. Consequently, and until 1945, Teplice Castle was the primarily seat of the princely Clary-Aldringen family. After the Thirty Years' War, the devastated town was the destination of many German settlers.

After a blaze in 1793, large parts of the town were rebuilt in a Neoclassical style. The health resort was a popular venue for wealthy bourgeois like the poet Johann Gottfried Seume, who died on his stay in 1810, or Ludwig van Beethoven, who met here with Johann Wolfgang von Goethe in 1812; as well as for European monarchs. During the Napoleonic War of the Sixth Coalition, Teplice in August 1813 was the site where Emperor Francis I of Austria, Emperor Alexander I of Russia and King Frederick William III of Prussia first signed the triple alliance against Napoleon that led to the coalition victory at the nearby Battle of Kulm.

In 1895, Teplice merged with neighbouring Lázně Šanov (Schönau). Upon the dissolution of Austria-Hungary after World War I and the 1919 Treaty of Saint-Germain-en-Laye, the predominantly German-speaking population found itself in newly established Czechoslovakia. According to the 1930 census there were 30,799 people living in the city (23,127 of German, 5,232 of Czechoslovak, 667 of Jewish, and 12 of Hungarian ethnicity). Right-wing political groups like the German National Socialist Worker's Party referred to themselves as Volksdeutsche and began to urge for a unification with Germany, their efforts laid the foundation for the rise of the Sudeten German Party under Konrad Henlein after 1933. In 1938, Teplice was annexed by Nazi Germany according to the 1938 Munich Agreement and was administered as part of the Reichsgau Sudetenland. In 1930, 3,213 Jews lived in Teplice and formed 10% of the population. Under the Nazi regime they faced the Holocaust in the Sudetenland. Many fled and the Teplice Synagogue was burnt during Kristallnacht.

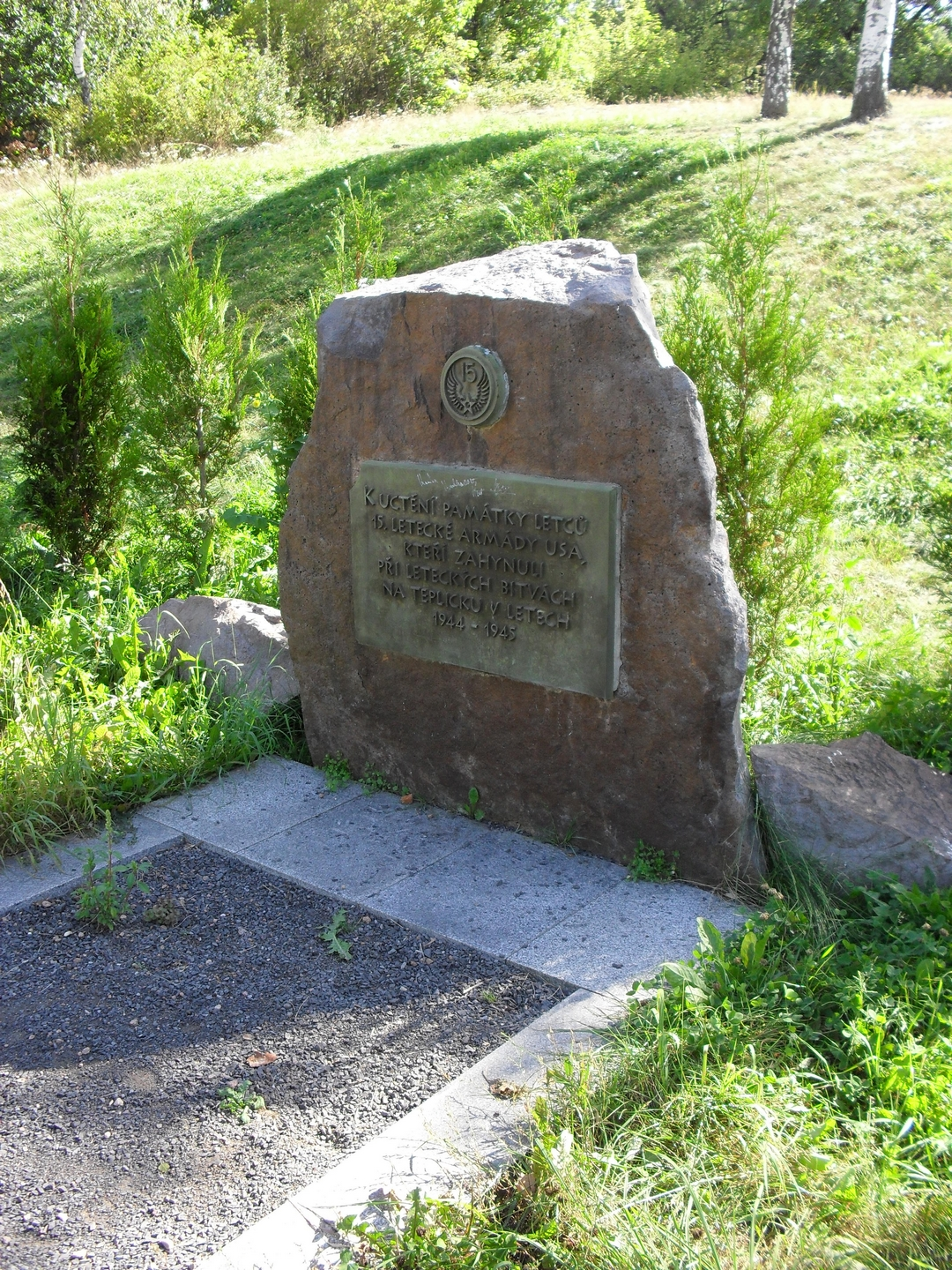
Memorial to fallen pilots of the 15th division of the US Air Force

After World War II, the Czechoslovak government enacted the Beneš decrees, whereafter the German-speaking majority of the population was expelled from Teplice. In 1945, the Princes of Clary-Aldringen, lords of Teplice since 1634, were expropriated.

== Demographics ==
Historical population

Year	Pop.	±%
1869	15,469	—
1880	23,649	+52.9%
1890	31,056	+31.3%
1900	44,626	+43.7%
1910	50,896	+14.1%

Year	Pop.	±%
1921	52,655	+3.5%
1930	56,088	+6.5%
1950	41,891	−25.3%
1961	49,360	+17.8%
1970	52,941	+7.3%

Year	Pop.	±%
1980	53,964	+1.9%
1991	53,004	−1.8%
2001	51,060	−3.7%
2011	49,640	−2.8%
2021	48,428	−2.4%

Source: Censuses

== Economy ==
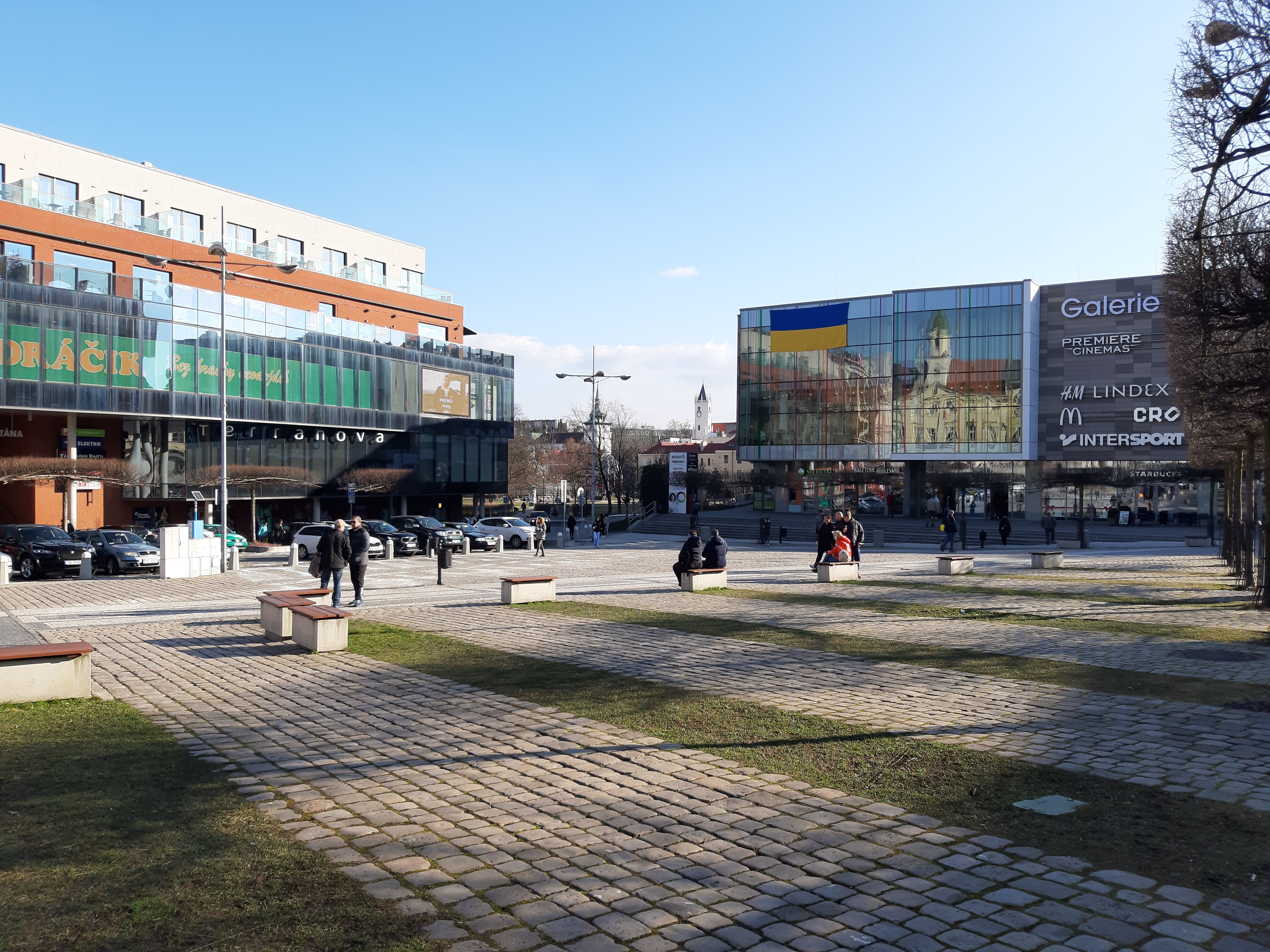
The square Náměstí Svobody

The largest employers based in the city are AGC Flat Glass Czech (manufacturer of flat glass for the construction and automotive industries) and Severočeská servisní (a company that deals with construction and maintenance of pipelines), both with more than 1,000 employees.

=== Spa ===
One of the most important employers is the spa. The thermal mineral springs were mentioned already in 1154, which makes the spa the oldest in the country and Central Europe. The Pravřídlo spring reaches a temperature of 41 °C. The spa focuses on treatment of musculoskeletal disorders, nervous system diseases, and vascular diseases.

== Transport ==
Teplice is located at the junction of two major roads: the I/8 road, which connect the D8 motorway with the Czech–German border crossing in Dubí-Cínovec, and the I/13 road from Liberec to Karlovy Vary.

Teplice is located on the intraregional railway lines Prague–Cheb, Děčín–Kadaň and Ústí nad Labem–Litvínov. The local line to Radejčín starts here. The city is served by four train stations ans stops: Teplice v Čechách, Teplice zámecká zahrada, Řetenice and Prosetice. In addition, the train station Proboštov that primarily serves the neighbouring municipality of Proboštov is also situated in the territory of Teplice.

== Culture ==
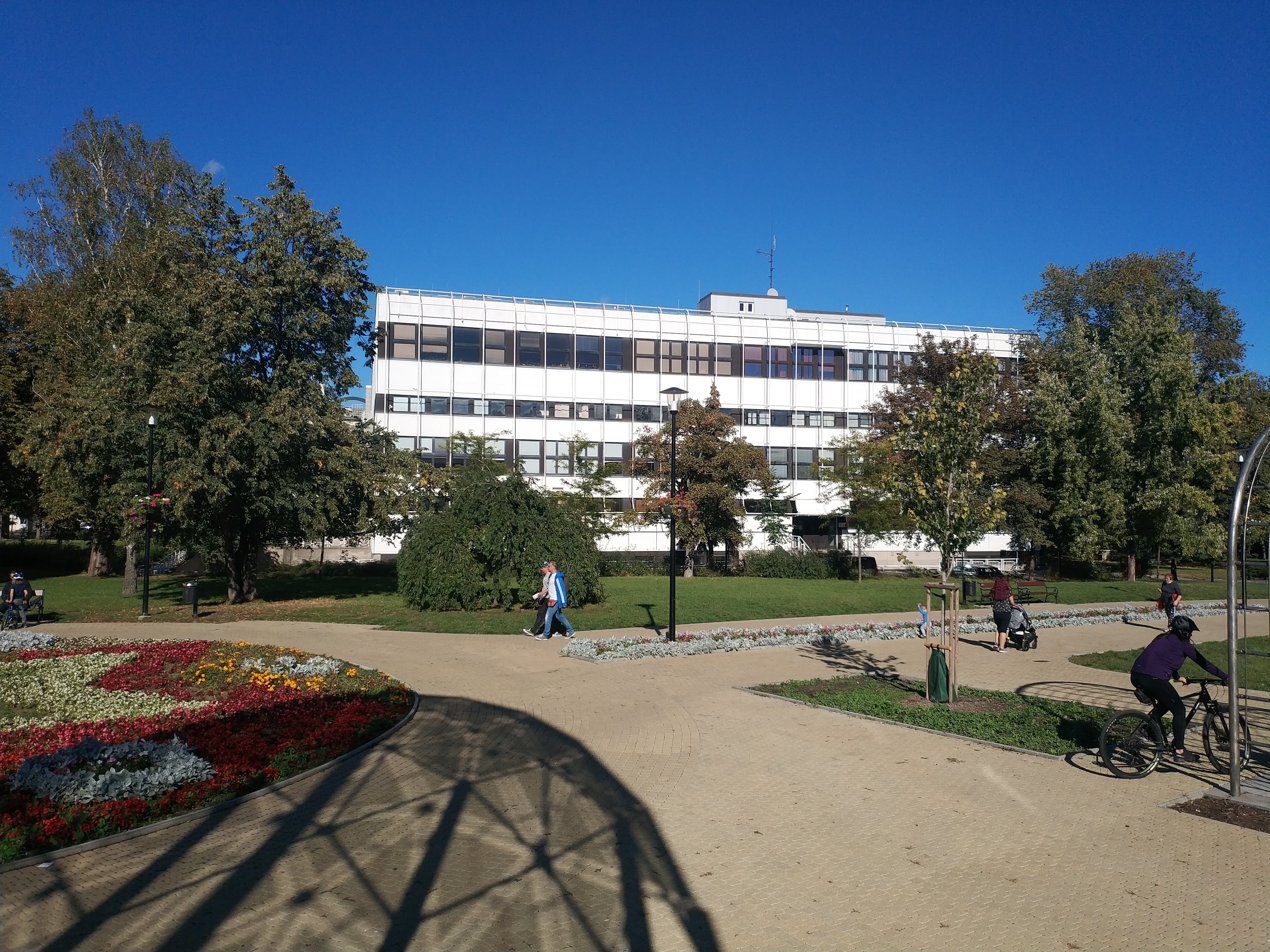
House of Culture Teplice

The city used to be nicknamed "Little Paris" and "Salon of Europe" for its spa architecture and cultural level until World War II, when it has been visited by prominent personalities including emperors, artists and other celebrities. The opening of the spa season is an annual three-day celebration with a rich cultural program.

The main venue for cultural events in the city is Dům kultury Teplice ('House of Culture Teplice'). It was built in 1981–1986. It includes a concert hall, a hall for dance activities, a cinema, and a puppet theatre.

The Krušnohorské Theatre is the city's main venue for operas and plays. It was opened in 1924. The theatre had its own operetta troupe, but it ceased to exist in 1994, and since then only guest troupes have performed in the theatre.

Teplice is the home of the North Czech Philharmonic Teplice, which was founded in 1838. Performances regularly take place in the concert hall of the House of Culture Teplice.

== Sport ==
Teplice is home to the professional association football club FK Teplice playing in the Czech First League. The stadium Na Stínadlech is one of the largest in the country and has hosted international matches.

== Sights ==
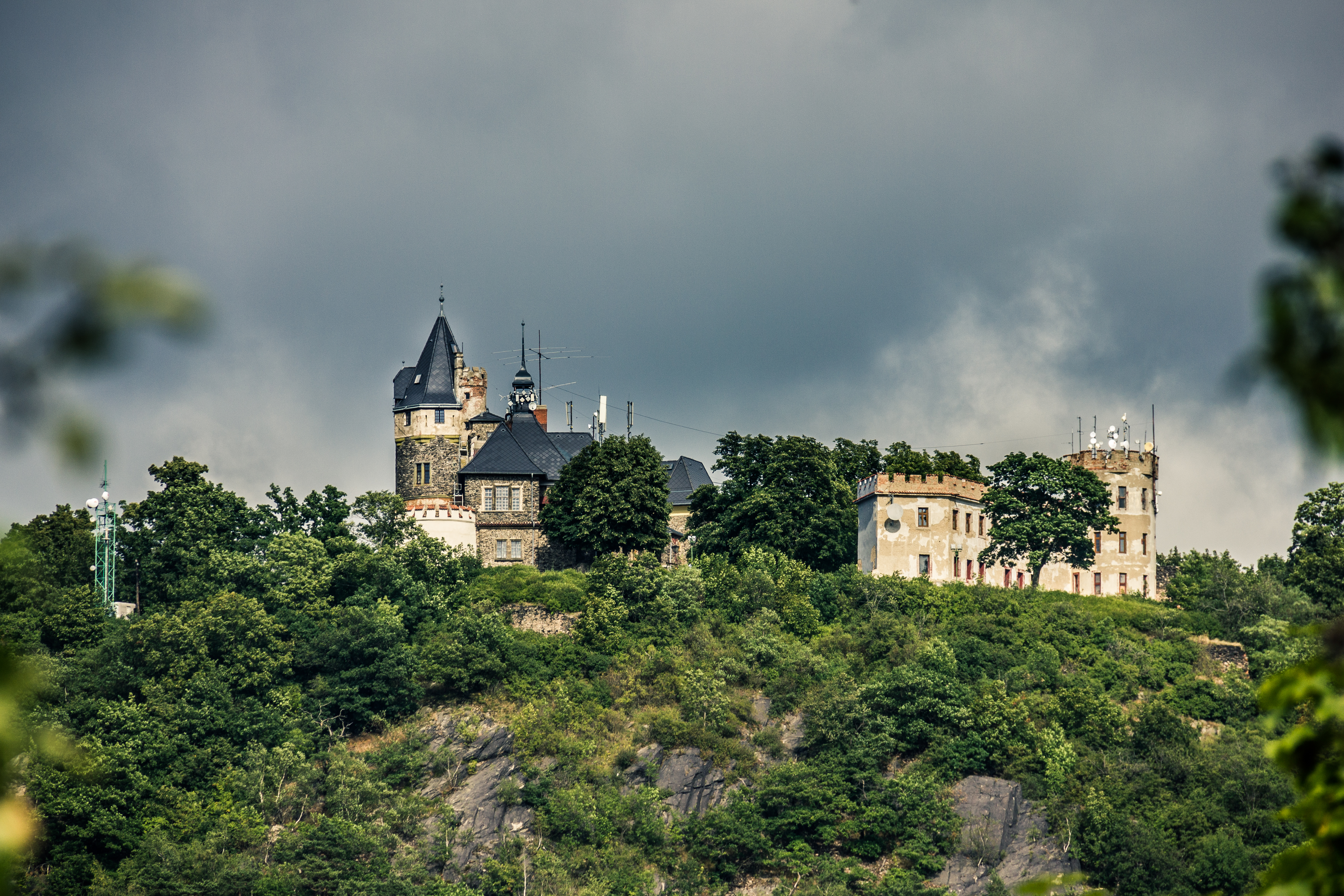
Doubravka Castle

The main landmark of the city is the Teplice Castle. It houses a regional museum with historic castle interiors and a library. In the inner courtyard of the castle, there is a unique Romanesque exposition with the remains of Queen Judith and the remains of a Romanesque basilica with a rarely preserved Romanesque crypt. Adjoining the castle is a large castle garden.

The Church of Saint John the Baptist is a Baroque building from 1594, rebuilt in 1703 to its current form. Its tower is open to the public and serves as a lookout tower.

The neo-Gothic Church of Saint Bartholomew was built in 1884 for German population of Lutheran faith. After their expulsion, the church changed owners several times and ceased to serve its purpose. Today it is conserved as a cultural monument and there are expositions concerning the history of the Jewish community in Teplice, and other.

Doubravka Castle is a castle ruin located in Trnovany part of Teplice. It was built in 1483 and conquered in 1639 during the Thirty Years' War. The castle began to serve as a destination for walks and in the 19th century, a restaurant and the neo-Gothic extension were built. Today there is a restaurant and a private lookout tower.

== Paleontology ==
Fossils of an elasmosaurid plesiosaur (large carnivorous marine reptile from the Cretaceous period) were found near Teplice at the end of the 19th century. In the village of Hudcov (a part of Teplice), plesiosaur Cimoliasaurus teplicensis was described in 1906 by Czech paleontologist Antonín Frič.

== Notable people ==
- Antoni Wilhelm Radziwiłł (1833–1904), Prussian-Polish nobleman and military leader
- Julius von Payer (1841–1915), Austrian arctic explorer
- August Stradal (1860–1930), pianist
- Karl Pohlig (1864–1928), conductor
- Prince Siegfried von Clary-Aldringen (1848–1920), Austro-Hungarian diplomat
- Humbert Achamer-Pifrader (1900–1945), Austrian jurist and member of the SS
- Paul Kohner (1902–1988), Austrian-American film producer
- Frederick Kohner (1905–1986), Austrian-American writer
- Marianne Winder (1918–2001), British librarian
- Felix Holzmann (1921–2001), comedian
- Helmut Pfleger (born 1943), German chess grandmaster
- Jaromír Kohlíček (1953–2020), politician
- Bohdan Chlíbec (born 1963), poet
- Daniela Peštová (born 1970), model
- Robert Lang (born 1970), ice hockey player
- Lucie Králová (born 1982), Miss Czech Republic 2005

=== Residents ===
- Adam Adamandy Kochański (1631–1700), mathematician; died here
- Johann Gottfried Seume (1763–1810), poet; died here
- Ludwig van Beethoven (1770–1827), composer; began writing his Symphony No. 7 here in 1812
- Novalis (1772–1801), poet and philosopher; wrote his "Teplitz Fragments" while staying here
- Karl Ludwig von Ficquelmont (1777–1857), Austrian diplomat and statesman; resided here at his daughter's castle
- Dorothea de Ficquelmont (1804–1863); died here at her daughter's castle
- Richard Wagner (1813–1883), began composing the music to his opera Tannhäuser here during a vacation in 1843
- Adolf Kurrein (1846–1919), rabbi of Teplice from 1888
- Count Manfred von Clary-Aldringen (1852–1928), Austro-Hungarian statesman; resided here in his family's castle
- Otto Tetens (1865–1945), astronomer; died here
- Oscar Straus (1870–1954) worked here as a Kapellmeister
- Ruth von Mayenburg (1907–1993), writer; grew up here
- Kurt Eichhorn (1908–1994), conductor; worked here
- František Fajtl (1912–2006), fighter pilot and writer; studied here in 1928–1932
- Jaroslav Kubera (1947–2020), politician, mayor of Teplice in 1994–2018
