= Ignaz Ziegler =

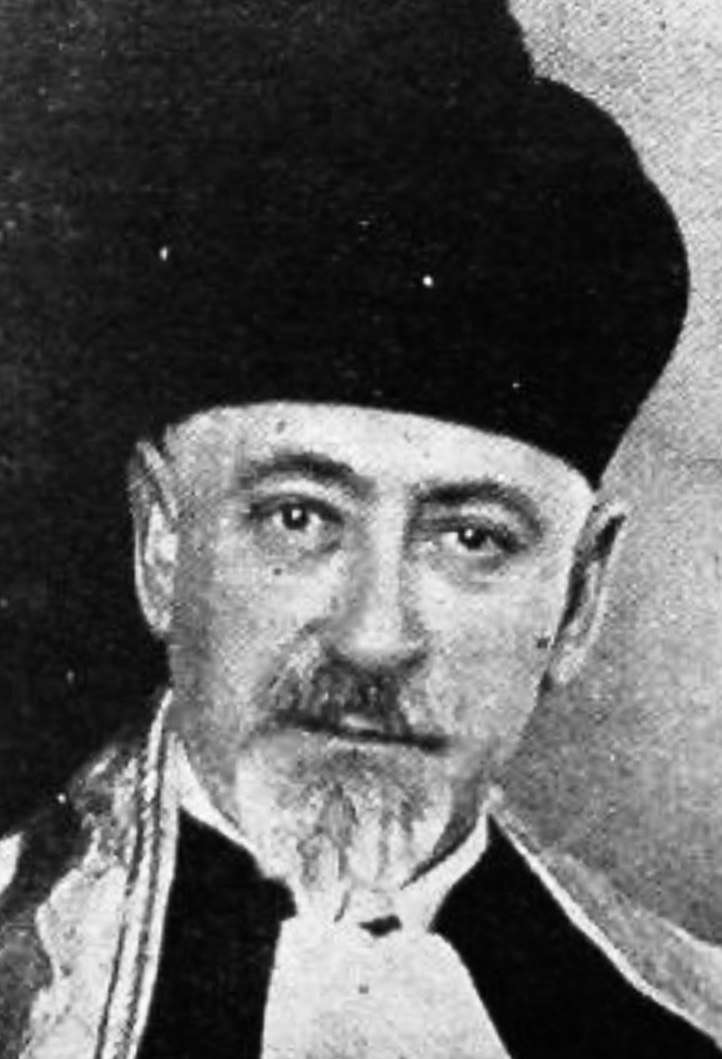
Ignaz Ziegler

Ignaz Ziegler (Hungarian: Ziegler Ignác; 29 September 1861 in Dolný Kubín, then Hungary – 1948) was an Austrian-Czech rabbi, chief rabbi of Karlovy Vary.

He was educated at the Budapest University of Jewish Studies and at the University of Budapest (Ph.D. 1888). Immediately after his graduation he was called to the rabbinate of Carlsbad. Through his efforts the Kaiser Franz Josef Regierungs-Jubiläum Hospiz was erected at Carlsbad, at a cost of 500,000 Austrian crowns, to provide food, shelter, and medical treatment for indigent Jews who come to that city in large numbers in search of healthcare. This institution was opened on 1 May 1903.

== Works ==
Ziegler's works are as follows:

- a Hungarian dissertation on the prophet Malachi (Budapest, 1888)
- Religiöse Disputationen im Mittelalter (Frankfort-on-the-Main, 1894)
- Geschichte des Judentums (Prague, 1900)
- Die Königsgleichnisse im Midrasch (Breslau, 1903)
