= Kitty Hart-Moxon =

Polish-born Holocaust survivor and author (born 1926)

Kitty Hart-Moxon OBE
- Born: Katarzyna Felix; 1 December 1926 (age 99); Bielsko, Poland
- Citizenship: Polish-British
- Occupations: Diagnostic radiographer, author
- Known for: Holocaust survivor
- Parents: Karol Felix (father); Lola Rosa Felix (mother)

Kitty Hart-Moxon (born 1 December 1926) is a Polish-British Holocaust survivor. She was sent to the Auschwitz-Birkenau death camp in 1943 at the age of 16, where she survived for two years, and was also imprisoned at other camps. Shortly after her liberation, she moved to England with her mother, where she married and dedicated her life to raising awareness of the Holocaust. She has written two autobiographies entitled I am Alive (1961) and Return to Auschwitz (1981).

== Early life ==
Hart-Moxon was born Katarzyna Felix, on 1 December 1926, in the southern Polish town of Bielsko (known as Bielitz in German), which bordered both Germany and Czechoslovakia, as the second child of Karol Felix (born c. 1888) and his wife Lola Rosa Felix (born 18 February 1890); her brother Robert was five years old at the time.

Kitty's paternal family had come from Italy centuries before. Her father had studied law in Vienna, and had been a captain in the Austrian army in the First World War. Upon his father's death, he took over his agricultural supply business, which he ran with his sister, until the outbreak of the war. Lola's father was also in the agricultural business: he was a land-owning farmer, and Kitty believes that this may have been how her parents met (Lola's father potentially using Karol as a supplier).

Her mother had Slovakian roots; Lola's sister had studied medicine in Vienna, and Lola herself went to England in 1911 to study English at Bedford College, London, eventually becoming an English teacher in Poland, where she taught children preparing for their state examinations.

Since 1795 Poland had been divided between Austria-Hungary, the German Empire and the Russian Empire; the town of Bielsko belonged to Austria-Hungary, and thus the majority of its residents, including the Felix family, were German speakers. Kitty only started learning Polish and basic English in nursery, (with her mother teaching the children English nursery rhymes).

Growing up, Kitty was extremely sporty, and participated in gymnastics, athletics, swimming, and skiing. The family were well-off, and could afford to send Kitty to private schooling.

Lola and Karol Felix were liberal Jews who did not observe Jewish customs (including not keeping a kosher home and only attending synagogue occasionally). The majority of people the family mingled with, however, were Jews, with Kitty herself frequenting Jewish social clubs, attending a Jewish primary school, and attending the predominantly-Jewish, private all-girl Convent School of Notre Dame for a year (until the outbreak of war).

Kitty has stated that growing up, she was completely oblivious to the political situation in both Poland, and wider Europe, including Hitler's rise to power. One thing she does recall from her youth, however, is a girl joining her school who stated that she and her family had been expelled from Germany for being Jews.

== Outbreak of War ==
In late August 1939, with Kitty temporarily having lost contact during a canoeing trip, her mother received a phone call from Karol telling them they must return home straight away. Kitty's brother Robert was also on holiday with his friends at the time, and was summoned home as well. There, their father had packed up all their possessions, and sent Kitty and her mother to board the train to Lublin straight away (rumor had it that German troops had deployed machine guns on the town's rooftops and were firing at the town's citizens).

Two days later (still prior to the Nazis' invasion of Poland on 1 September), Karol and Robert joined them in Lublin, traveling on one of the last trains out of town. Karol had arranged for the family's possessions to be sent on to Lublin by train; that train was bombed and their possessions were lost. The family's flight from Bielsko was the first time Kitty felt the effects of the war.

On 1 September 1939, the German forces invaded Poland.

== Ghettos ==
The conditions for Jews living in Lublin deteriorated after the invasion. Eventually, all the Jews in Lublin were moved into a single area of the city, creating the Lublin Ghetto. In the spring of 1941, the family attempted to escape to Russia. They made it to the border but found that it had closed 24 hours previously. They attempted to cross the frozen river by sleigh but were sighted when they were about three-quarters of the way across and shot at. Forced to return to the Polish side of the river, they abandoned their escape attempt and returned towards Lublin.

The family returned to the vicarage of Father Krasowski, where her father bribed some officials and obtained false documents for her and her mother. With these passports, birth, and identity cards, the two were smuggled onto a train of Polish forced labourers bound for Germany. The family split up to increase their chance of survival. Kitty went with her mother to I.G. Farben in Bitterfeld and commenced working at a rubber factory.

On 13 March 1943, Kitty and 12 other Jews at the factory, including her mother, were betrayed and taken to Gestapo headquarters. The family members were interrogated and charged at trial three days later with "endangering the security of Third Reich" and "illegally [entering] Germany with forged papers." They were told they would be executed and placed in front of a firing squad. After the squad conducted a mock execution, the victims were told their sentences had been commuted to hard labour.

== Auschwitz II (Birkenau) ==
On 6 April 1943, when Kitty was 16, she and her mother arrived at Auschwitz. They found jobs working with dead prisoners, which was less physically demanding than working outside the camp. To aid in their survival, they took items from the dead, and traded those and other items with other prisoners. At one point, Kitty became ill with typhus; she thinks the typhus immunisation that her father managed to arrange in the Lublin Ghetto may have been responsible for her recovery. Throughout their imprisonment, Kitty maintained a variety of jobs, including one as a night shift worker responsible for sorting through the confiscated possessions of prisoners arriving by train.

Rumours began in August 1944 that Auschwitz was to be evacuated. Kitty's mother was selected as one of 100 prisoners to be removed from the camp. She saw the commandant walking and ran to him and deferentially requested that her daughter be allowed to leave the camp with her. The commandant obliged, which Kitty has stated was probably due to her mother's perfect, respectful, formal spoken German. So, in November 1944, Kitty was taken along with several hundred prisoners to Gross-Rosen concentration camp. Every day, the camp occupants were marched to a nearby town to work in the Philips electronic factory.

In Sied Forces, the prisoners of Gross Rosen were forced on what would later be called a death march across the Sudeten mountains. They were chosen to be moved, rather than executed, because Albert Speer, the German armaments minister, believed the special skills they had gained at the Phillips factory would be useful in other German factories for the manufacture of "jamming transmitters and equipment for high-performance aircraft".

The prisoners were eventually taken to a train station and shipped across Europe to Porta Westfalica in northwestern Germany. Only about 200 of the original 10,000 prisoners, including Kitty and her mother, survived the journey.

In Porta Westfalica, the prisoners were sent to work in an underground factory.

== Liberation ==
After a time in Porta Westfalica, Kitty and her mother were sent to Bergen-Belsen, at which point they were abandoned in a locked train car and left to die. After being released by a group of German soldiers, they were transported to a camp near Salzwedel. After liberation, Kitty and her mother began working as translators for the British Army. Later, the two moved to help with the Quaker Relief Team, staying in a displaced persons camp outside Braunschweig.

Kitty and her mother tried to locate their family members soon after they were liberated but found that everyone else had been killed: her father had been discovered by the Gestapo and shot; her brother was killed in battle; and her grandmother was taken to Belzec concentration camp and was murdered in the gas chambers.

== After the war ==
In September 1946, Kitty emigrated with her mother to Birmingham, England to live with her mother's sister, who had resided there since 1938. In 1949, she married Polish emigre Rudi Hart, an upholsterer, who had arrived in England through the Kindertransport programme. They had two sons, David and Peter. Kitty divorced her first husband, and by 1992, she married Phillip Moxon. Together, they continued her Holocaust work.

While in England, Kitty Hart-Moxon became interested in educating people about the Holocaust by telling her life story to the public. This began with her first book I Am Alive (1961) (see References); this is an account of her life from the day in 1939 when, while away on holiday with her mother, they received a telegram from her father insisting they return at once, through the events that led to her incarceration in Auschwitz in 1942, to her liberation from Auschwitz in April 1945.

Then, in 1978, Yorkshire Television (YTV) producer Peter Morley's team learned about Hart-Moxon while doing background research on a project about women who risked their lives to save others during the Nazi era, and convinced him to meet her. She didn't fit the parameters they'd set for Women of Courage, but after two visits, Morley was so impressed with Hart-Moxon, he submitted a proposal to YTV to accompany her to Auschwitz for her first visit in 33 years and film it, provided she brought along her eldest son, then a young doctor, for emotional support. In his memoirs, Morley wrote, "This, no doubt, was going to be a very raw film... I felt this to be a unique opportunity to add fresh insight to the infamy of Auschwitz as had been portrayed in both fictional and non-fictional films and television programmes."

The resulting documentary, Kitty: Return to Auschwitz, won international awards and was seen by millions. She began to receive mail by the sackful, some arriving addressed only to "Kitty, Birmingham". The documentary inspired her second autobiography, titled Return To Auschwitz. She later worked with the BBC to make a second documentary, titled Death March: A Survivor's Story (2003), in which she retraced the death march from Auschwitz-Birkenau back to Germany.

In 1998, Hart-Moxon gave her testimony to USC Shoah Foundation—The Institute for Visual History and Education. Her testimony lives in the Visual History Archive, accessible to teachers and students around the world.

In 2014, Kitty participated in a documentary resulting in her taking a new generation to Auschwitz telling of her experience. That year was her last trip to the camp. The documentary was called: “One Day In Auschwitz”.

In 2016, Kitty spoke to the Auschwitz Study Group about her time in Auschwitz and also rejected unequivocally the story of Denis Avey who claimed to have escaped from Auschwitz.

Apart from her work for Holocaust survivors and victims, she also worked as a radiographer. In March 1947, she began studies through a private nurse training course and at the Birmingham Royal Orthopaedic Hospital, after which she obtained a job at a private radiology firm. Later she helped her husband set up his own upholstery business.

== Honours ==
In the 2003 Queen's Birthday Honours, Hart-Moxon was appointed Officer of the Order of the British Empire (OBE) for services relating to Holocaust education. In 2013, Kitty Hart-Moxon was awarded an honorary doctorate by the University of Birmingham.

== Biography ==
- I Am Alive (1961)
- Return to Auschwitz: The Remarkable Story of a Girl Who Survived the Holocaust (1981)
