= Roman Frister =

Polish born Israeli journalist (1928–2015)

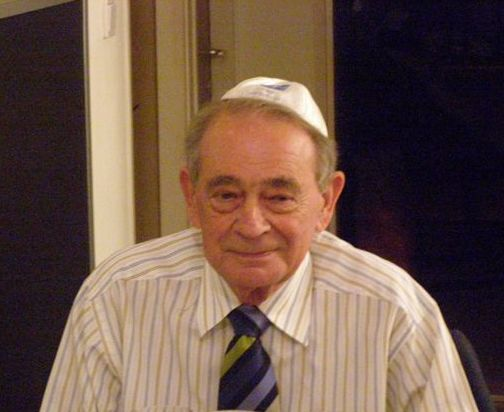
- Born: 17 January 1928; Bielsko, Poland
- Died: 9 February 2015 (aged 87); Warsaw, Poland

Roman Frister (17 January 1928 – 9 February 2015) wrote The Cap: The Price of a Life, an autobiographical account of his life living in Nazi occupied Poland and then Poland under the communists.

Frister spent time in:

- the Cracow detention centre, where Frister witnessed his mother's murder when she was struck with a pistol on the head by SS-Hauptsturmführer Wilhelm Kunde;
- Starachowice forced labor camp, where he witnessed his father die of epidemic typhus;
- Mauthausen;
- Auschwitz;
- a death march to Mauthausen again, after which he was released.

The Cap provides a frank account of his survival and includes much of his post-war life covering aspects of his career as an award-winning Israeli journalist after his emigration in 1957.

In 1967 Frister gave evidence at Wilhelm Kunde's trial held in Kiel, Germany. Kunde was sentenced to seven years.

After immigrating to Israel, Frister became a prominent columnist and editor in the Israeli daily newspaper Haaretz. In 1990 he cofounded a school for journalism in Tel Aviv named "Coteret". In 2006 the school was incorporated into Tel Aviv University. Many of the school's graduates work is in Israeli media today. Frister died in Poland on 9 February 2015.

Other books by Frister include:

- Impossible Love: Ascher Levi's Longing for Germany. Weidenfeld & Nicolson. 2003.
- Le-lo Pesharah [Uncompromising] (in Hebrew). Zemorah, Bitan. 1987. ISBN 978-9650304201.
- ha-Zehut ha-genuvah [The Stolen Identity - Itzhak Liebmann's Double Life]. Zemorah, Bitan. 1985. ISBN 978-9650303228.
- Asiri Le Minyan [Tenth for a Minyan] (in Hebrew). Zemorah, Bitan. 1983. ISBN 978-9650300135.
- Stormy Years. Bibleland Publications. 1975.
