= Sankt Anna am Aigen =

- Municipality
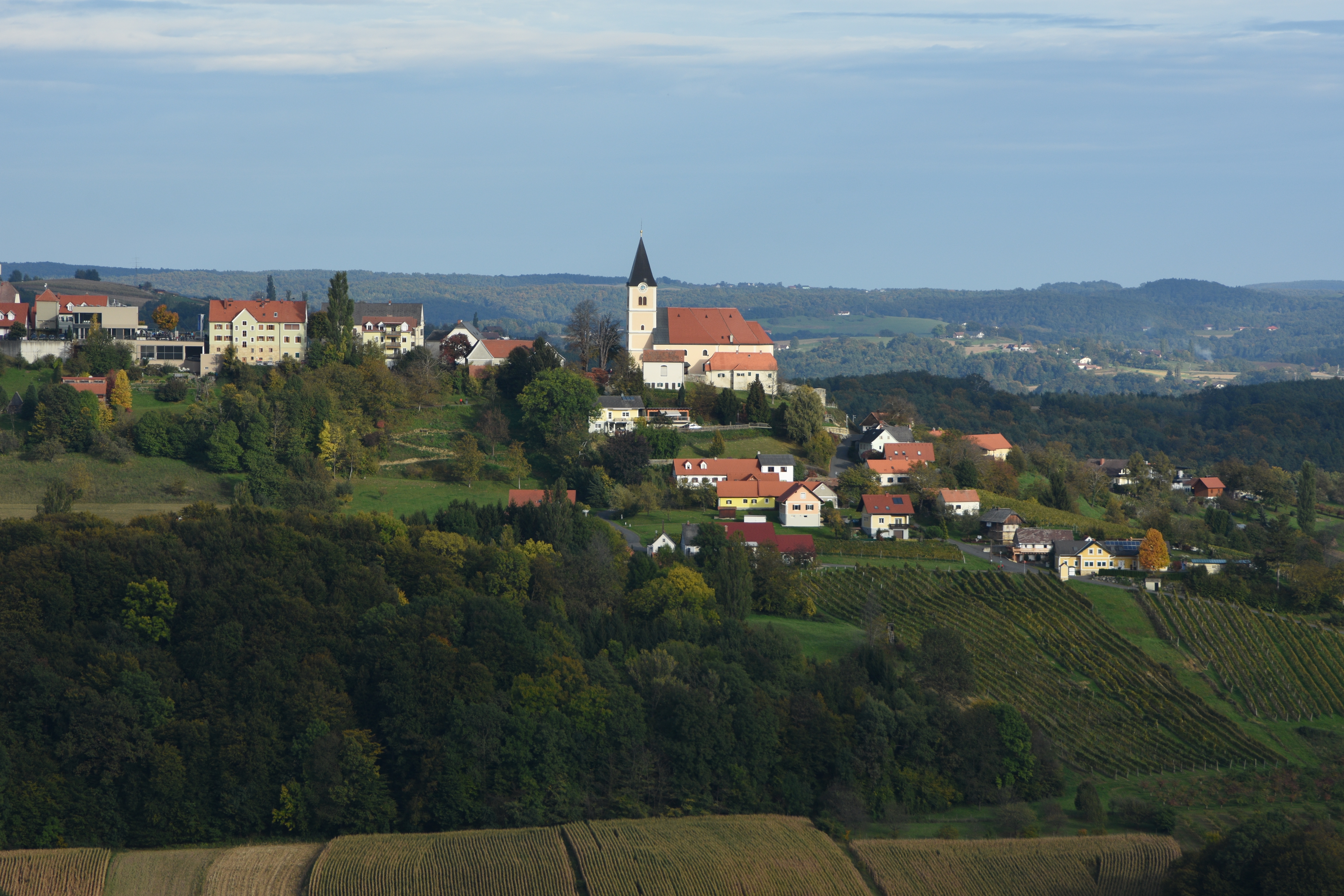
- View of Sankt Anna am Aigen

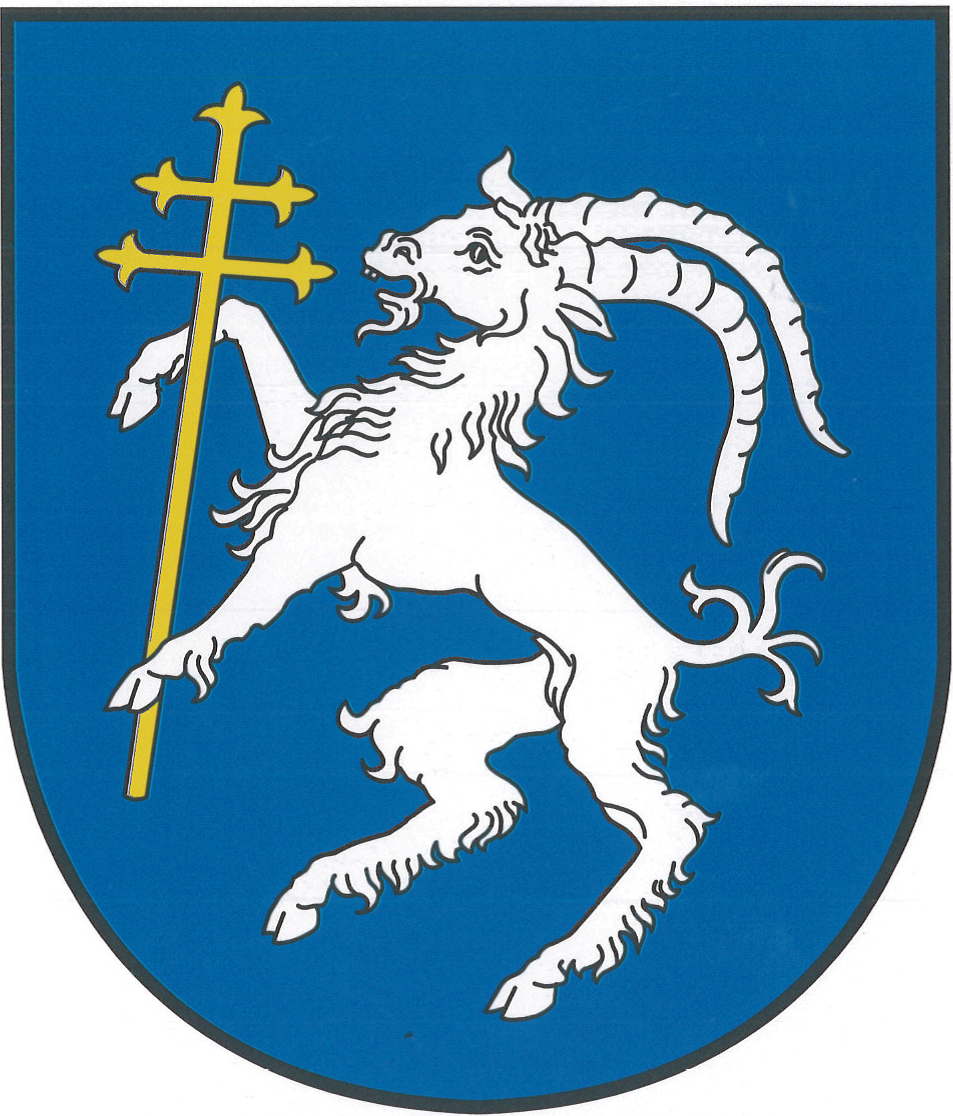
- Coat of arms

- Location within Austria
- Coordinates: 46°49′55″N 15°58′27″E
- Country: Austria
- State: Styria
- District: Südoststeiermark
- Established: 2015

Government
  - Mayor: Johannes Weidinger (ÖVP)

Area
  - Total: 32.65 km^{2} (12.61 sq mi)
- Elevation: 403 m (1,322 ft)

Population (2018-01-01)
  - Total: 2,334
  - Density: 71.49/km^{2} (185.1/sq mi)
- Time zone: UTC+1 (CET)
  - Summer (DST): UTC+2 (CEST)
- Postal code: 8354, 8355
- Area code: +43 3158
- Vehicle registration: SO
- Website: st-anna-aigen.gv.at

Sankt Anna am Aigen (Slovene: Sveta Ana na Igu, Prekmurje Slovene: Sveta Ana pr Igi) is a municipality in the district of Südoststeiermark in the Austrian state of Styria.

== Geography ==
Sankt Anna am Aigen is located in the East Styrian Hills. It lies approximately 70 km southeast of Graz, approximately 25 km southeast of Feldbach and approximately 16 km north of Bad Radkersburg.

== Population ==
Historical population
Year	Pop.	±%
1869	2,935	—
1880	3,016	+2.8%
1890	3,130	+3.8%
1900	3,075	−1.8%
1910	3,191	+3.8%
1923	3,041	−4.7%
1934	3,056	+0.5%
1939	2,905	−4.9%
1951	2,903	−0.1%
1961	2,809	−3.2%
1971	2,787	−0.8%
1981	2,731	−2.0%
1991	2,621	−4.0%
2001	2,564	−2.2%
2011	2,403	−6.3%
2021	2,367	−1.5%
