= Adolf Gawalewicz =

Polish jurist and writer (1916–1987)

Personal details
- Born: 2 September 1916 Lwów, Poland
- Died: 11 June 1987 (aged 70) Kraków, Poland
- Citizenship: Poland
- Education: Jagiellonian University
- Occupation: Lawyer, Writer

Adolf Gawalewicz (2 September 1916 – 11 June 1987) was a Polish jurist and writer known for his memoirs of his years at Auschwitz and other Nazi concentration camps.

== Life and work ==
Gawalewicz spent his childhood and high-school years in Lwów, graduating from gymnasium in 1935, and then in June 1939, obtained a law degree from the Jagiellonian University in Kraków. He worked for a time in the municipal administration of the city of Kraków.

After the Nazi invasion of Poland he participated in underground resistance and distributed underground publications, activities for which he was arrested by the Nazis on 16 September 1940, and incarcerated in the Montelupich Prison.

On 9 January 1941, he was deported to the Auschwitz concentration camp where he was assigned inmate number 9225. Władysław Fejkiel (1911–1995) reports that in the winter of 1941/42 Gawalewicz was brought to the camp's infirmary in a state of unconsciousness and so extremely emaciated that his body weight could not have been more than 35 kg; the medic's first thought was to prepare his death certificate. The nightmare of Auschwitz continued for Gawalewicz for nearly three and a half years, and later continued, from the middle of June 1944 onwards, at successive Nazi concentration camps: Buchenwald, Dachau, Mittelbau-Dora, Ellrich, and Bergen-Belsen.

At the time of his liberation by British forces, he was in a state of total exhaustion and afflicted by a serious pulmonary condition. In view of this, he was evacuated to a sanatorium in Sweden on 24 June 1945, where — owing to a successful lung operation and a lengthy convalescence — his health was partly restored.

He returned to Poland on 5 July 1946, and resumed his work in the municipal administration of Kraków. In 1948, he obtained his doctorate in law with a thesis on the "Implications of the Nazi Occupation of Poland on the Laws of Civil Administration". He dedicated himself to writing, authoring numerous publications and articles in the field of Nazi concentration camps studies as well as in his professional domain of jurisprudence.

His most famous book is Refleksje z poczekalni do gazu: ze wspomnień muzułmana (Reflections in the Gas Chamber's Waiting Room: From the Memoirs of a Muselmann) first published in 1968 (3rd ed., 2000), which, apart from being a personal memoir, is a study of the moral questions posed by the specific conditions of a Nazi concentration camp experience. The text ranks among the preeminent testimonials of such Holocaust survivors as Tadeusz Borowski, Halina Birenbaum, Primo Levi, and Elie Wiesel, who addressed the question of moral choice. Giorgio Agamben, for his part, chose to highlight Gawalewicz's observation that the abnormal conditions of the camp accounted for the aggravation of the normal physical and psychological differences between men. Agamben quotes Gawalewicz as saying: "Camp conditions made these differences more pronounced, and we often witnessed reversals of the roles played by physical and psychological factors." Patricia Treece brings out Gawalewicz's sophisticated analysis of the six distinct ways in which the concentration-camp system served the larger, but not readily apparent, purposes of Nazi Germany.

Gawalewicz participated as a material witness in the Frankfurt Auschwitz Trials in the 1960s. During the trial, he sparred with Nazi war criminal, Josef Klehr. The transcript of the exchange was published (in the original German version) in Hermann Langbein's monumental Der Auschwitz-Prozess: eine Dokumentation (1965).

During the post-War discussions on the stance that Auschwitz was to assume as a museum for posterity, he expressed the opinion that he believed would be shared by all former inmates that the camp should be left completely intact, without any decorative or modernizing changes, especially in the outdoor spaces, as opposed to those who never experienced the camp as it was in real life. He wrote — for a former prisoner:

Every perspective of the external structure, every stair, every brick or what might otherwise seem an insignificant detail is invested with the memory of the immeasurable immensity of suffering and dignity, of degradation and pride. Likewise the vision of dearest friends — the fellow inmates — is inextricably bound up with the camp as it was when they existed.

He died suddenly in Kraków on 11 June 1987.

== Works ==
=== Primary works ===
- Refleksje z poczekalni do gazu: ze wspomnień muzułmana (1968)
- Terenowa służba zatrudnienia w NRD (1974)
- Warunki i możliwości zmniejszenia zapotrzebowania na robotników niewykwalifikowanych: wyniki badań z terenu m. Krakowa (1979)
- Zawody deficytowe i ich wpływ na efektywność zatrudnienia: wyniki badań z terenu województwa miejskiego krakowskiego (1981)

=== Other works ===
- "Czym ma być Oświęcim?" (What is to Become of Auschwitz?), Dziennik Polski (Kraków), vol. 3, No. 217 (901), 11 August 1947, page 3.
- Foreword in: Adam Bujak, Oświęcim–Brzezinka–Auschwitz–Birkenau (1973)

== Bibliography ==
- Władysław Fejkiel, "Starvation in Auschwitz"; in: From the History of KL-Auschwitz, vol. 1, ed. Kazimierz Smoleń, tr. K. Michalik, Oświęcim, Państwowe Muzeum w Oświęcimiu, 1967, pages 131–132.
- Słownik literatury polskiej XX wieku, ed. A. Brodzka, et al., Wrocław, Zakład Narodowy im. Ossolińskich, 1992, page 744. ISBN 8304039427.
- Medical and Psychological Effects of Concentration Camps on Holocaust Survivors, ed. R. Krell & M. I. Sherman, foreword Elie Wiesel, New Brunswick (New Jersey), Transaction Publishers, 1997, pages 63, 113–114. ISBN 1560002905. (Extensive bibliographical references to Gawalewicz's periodical publications.)
- Judith Hemmendinger and Robert Krell, The Children of Buchenwald: Child Survivors of the Holocaust and Their Post-war Lives, Jerusalem, Gefen Publishing House, 2000, page 173. ISBN 965229246X.
- Jonathan Huener, Auschwitz, Poland, and the Politics of Commemoration, 1945–1979, Athens (Ohio), Ohio University Press, 2003, pages 265, 301. ISBN 0821415069, ISBN 0821415077.
- Naomi Baumslag, Murderous Medicine: Nazi Doctors, Human Experimentation, and Typhus, Westport (Connecticut), Praeger Publishers, 2005, pages 26–27. ISBN 0275983129.
- Biography by the Państwowe Muzeum Auschwitz-Birkenau in Oświęcim, Poland (see online).
