= 2024 in Poland =

- Decades: 2000s; 2010s; 2020s
- See also: Other events of 2024; Timeline of Polish history

Events in the year 2024 in Poland.

== Incumbents ==
Incumbents
| Position | Person | Party |
|---|---|---|
| President | Andrzej Duda | Independent (Supported by Law and Justice) |
| Prime Minister | Donald Tusk | Civic Platform |
| Marshal of the Sejm | Szymon Hołownia | Poland 2050 |
| Marshal of the Senate | Małgorzata Kidawa-Błońska | Civic Platform |

== Elections ==
Bold indicates government parties.

2024 European Parliament election in Poland
| Party | | Leader | European Party | Seats | Popular vote | Percentage |
| English | Polish | Leader | European Party | Seats | Popular vote | Percentage |
|---|---|---|---|---|---|---|
| Civic Coalition | **Koalicja Obywatelska** | **Marcin Kierwiński** | European People's Party | 21 / 53 | **4,359,443** | **37.06%** |
| Law and Justice | Prawo i Sprawiedliwość | Małgorzata Gosiewska | European Conservatives and Reformists | 20 / 53 | 4,253,169 | 36.16% |
| Confederation | Konfederacja Wolność i Niepodległość | Ewa Zajączkowska-Hernik | Europe of Sovereign Nations Non-inscrits | 6 / 53 | 1,420,287 | 12.08% |
| Third Way | **Trzecia Droga** | **Michał Kobosko** | European People's Party Renew Europe | 3 / 53 | **813,238** | **6.91%** |
| The Left | **Lewica** | **Robert Biedroń** | Progressive Alliance of Socialists and Democrats | 3 / 53 | **741,071** | **6.3%** |
| Other | | | | 0 / 53 | 65.860 (Total) | 1.49% (Total) |
| Total and turnout | | | | 53 | 11,761,994 | 40.65% |

== Events ==
=== January ===
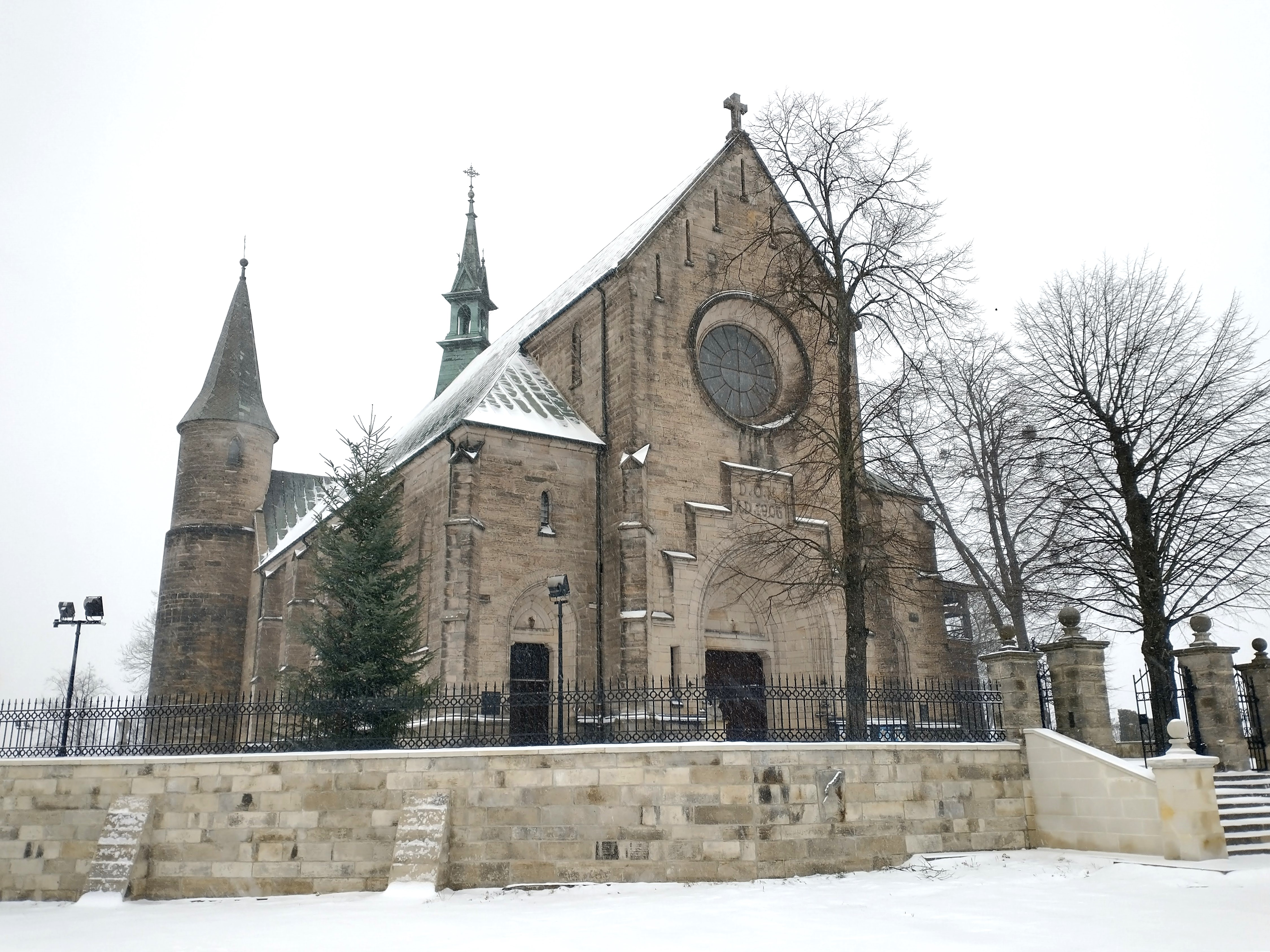
Medieval Romanesque church in Żarnów in January 2024

- 1 January – 34 localities were granted town rights: Białaczów, Bircza, Bobrowniki, Bogoria, Bolesławiec, Brody, Ciepielów, Czemierniki, Dobre, Gąsawa, Gielniów, Głowaczów, Gowarczów, Grabów, Inowłódz, Jawornik Polski, Kiernozia, Kikół, Maciejowice, Magnuszew, Mieścisko, Odrzywół, Osieck, Osjaków, Parzęczew, Piszczac, Przyrów, Przytyk, Rychtal, Siennica, Sienno, Strzeleczki, Turobin, Żarnów.
- 9 January – Former Interior Minister Mariusz Kaminski and his then-deputy Maciej Wasik are arrested by police inside the Presidential Palace in Warsaw following a legal dispute over their conviction and pardon for abuse of power. They are pardoned for a second time by President Andrzej Duda on 23 January.

=== March ===
- 1 March – Nineteen people are injured, including six children in a vehicle-ramming attack in Szczecin. Police rule out terrorism, and the suspect is found to have a history of mental illness.
- 5 March – One soldier is killed and another its injured after they are run over by a military tracked vehicle at the Drawsko Training Ground in Drawsko Pomorskie, West Pomeranian Voivodeship.
- 24 March – A Russian cruise missile violates Polish airspace over Oserdów, Lublin Voivodeship, prompting the activation of aircraft from the Polish Air Force.
- 29 March – President Andrzej Duda signs a law suspending the country's participation in the Treaty on Conventional Armed Forces in Europe. He also vetoes a law that would have allowed women ages 15 and above to have over the counter access to morning-after pills.

=== April ===
- 7 April – 2024 Polish local elections (first round): The opposition Law and Justice party comes first in local elections while the ruling coalition retains a majority of the votes.
- 18 April –A Polish national is arrested on suspicion of collecting intelligence at Rzeszów–Jasionka Airport for Russia as part of a plot to assassinate Ukrainian president Volodymyr Zelenskyy during his visit there, following a tip from Ukrainian authorities.
- 21 April – 2024 Polish local elections (second round)
- 28 April – Jastrzębski Węgiel won their fourth Polish Volleyball Championship defeating Warta Zawiercie in the finals (see 2023–24 PlusLiga).

=== May ===
- 10 May – 2024 Polish farmers' protests: Thousands of protesters march through Warsaw, against the European Union's environmental regulations.
- 12 May – A fire breaks out at the Marywilska 44 shopping complex in the Białołęka district of Warsaw, engulfing most of its 1,400 shops and service outlets.
- 14 May – Three miners are killed after part of the Mysłowice-Wesoła Coal Mine caves in.
- 23 May – A 17th-century painting by Jan Linsen that was stolen as part of a theft of 85 artworks from the Westfries Museum in Hoorn, The Netherlands in 2005 is recovered from an apartment in Kraków.

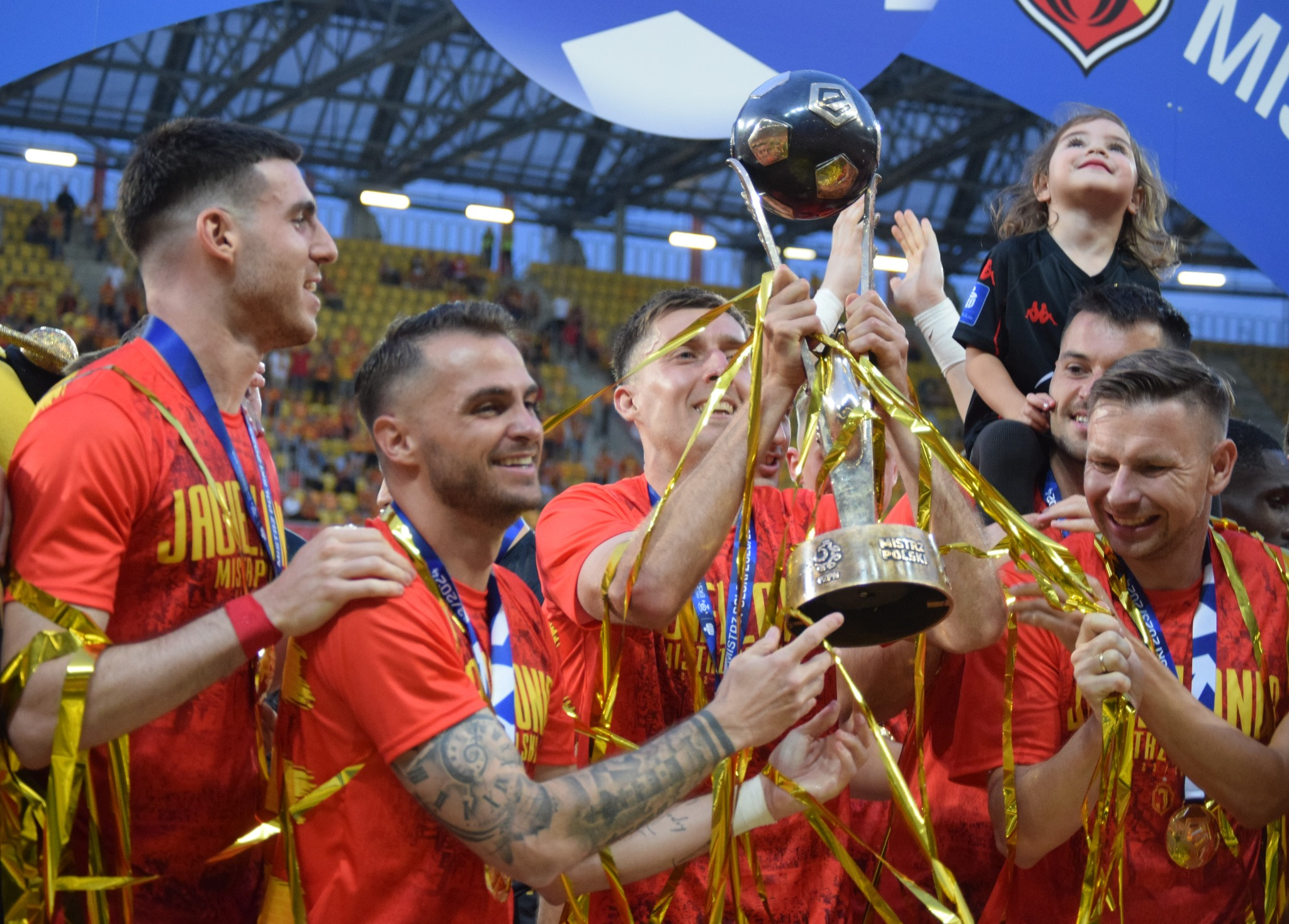
Jagiellonia Białystok players celebrate winning the Polish 2023–24 Polish Football Championship

- 25 May – Jagiellonia Białystok won their first Polish Football Championship (see 2023–24 Ekstraklasa).
- 28 May – A soldier is injured after being stabbed along the Poland-Belarus border by a migrant trying to enter the country illegally during a patrol in Podlaskie Voivodeship. He later dies of his injuries on 6 June.
- 29 May:
  - The Polish Defence Ministry gives Ukraine permission to use Polish-supplied weapons to strike targets inside Russian territory.
  - Two border guards are injured in an attack by migrants along the Poland-Belarus border.

=== June ===
- 9 June – 2024 European Parliament election: The Civic Coalition emerges as the largest party in the Polish contingent to the European Parliament.
- 10 June –
  - One person is killed in an explosion at the Mesko armaments plant in Skarżysko-Kamienna.
  - Poland announces a "no-go zone" in the Białowieża Forest in order to prevent migrants from crossing the border from Belarus. In response, concerns are raised about the potential impact on tourism during the summer.
- 16 June – Trefl Sopot won their first Polish Basketball Championship defeating King Szczecin in the finals (see 2023–24 PLK season).
- 19 June – The European Commission reprimands Belgium, France, Hungary, Italy, Malta, Poland, and Slovakia for breaking budget rules.
- 26 June – The leaders of Poland, Lithuania, Latvia, and Estonia call on the European Union to construct a €2.5 billion (US$2.67 billion) defence line between them and Russia and Belarus to secure the EU from military, economic, and migrant-related threats.

=== July ===
- 8 July – Ukrainian President Volodymyr Zelenskyy says Poland can shoot down Russian missiles inside Ukrainian airspace following the signing of a security agreement in Warsaw.
- 11 July – A magnitude 3.1 earthquake strikes the south of the country, killing a miner and injuring 17 others at the Rydultowy coal mine.
- 24 July – Polish Defense Minister Władysław Kosiniak-Kamysz states that Poland will block Ukraine's bid to join the European Union if it does not resolve issues regarding Ukrainian nationalists' massacre of Poles during World War II, including finding and burying all victims killed on current Ukrainian territory.

=== August ===
- 9 August – Prime Minister Donald Tusk announces that a six-month investigation had uncovered the illegal spending of 100 billion zlotys ($25 billion) in public funds by the previous Law and Justice government, resulting in charges against 62 officials.
- 24 August – South Africa blocks the transfer of 50,000 purchased artillery shells to Poland, citing concerns that they would be sent to Ukraine for use in the Russo-Ukrainian War.
- 26 August – 26 August 2024 Russian strikes on Ukraine: Poland says that a drone had likely entered its airspace during the attacks on Ukraine and that searches were underway for the object as it may have landed in Polish territory.
- 27 August –
  - Ukrainian president Zelenskyy announces that Poland will cooperate with Ukraine to return Ukrainians "who violated the law, traitors, collaborators" by illegally crossing the Poland–Ukraine border in order to escape conscription in the Russo-Ukrainian War.
  - A man from Gaiki, Lower Silesian Voivodeship is arrested for abducting and abusing a woman for five years.
- 29 August – The National Electoral Commission rules that the Law and Justice party illegally spent 3.6 million zlotys ($930,000) in public funds for its campaign in the 2023 Polish parliamentary election and orders it to return the amount. The body also orders a reduction in government subsidies for the party.

=== September ===
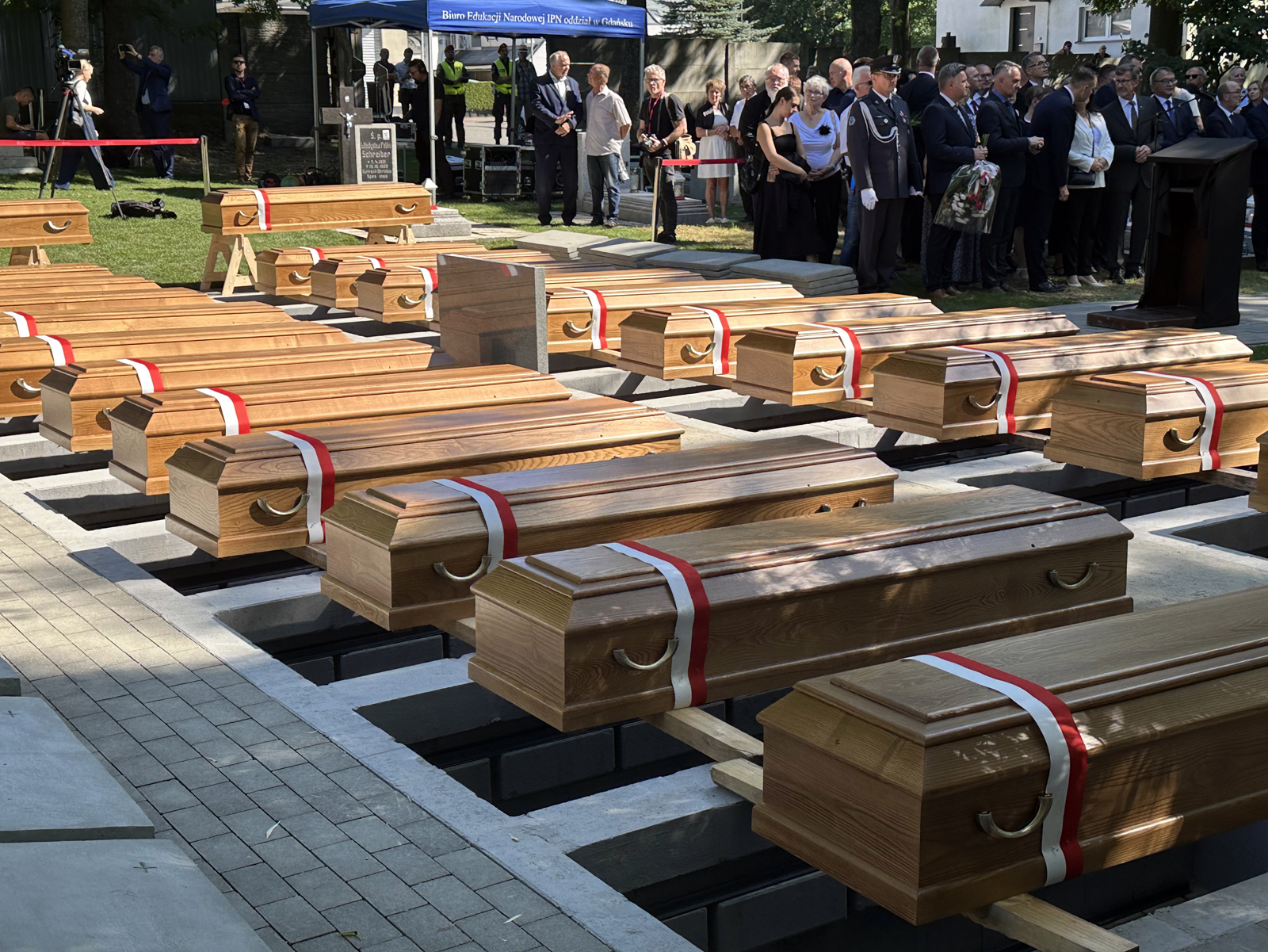
State funeral of victims of Nazi German atrocities in Chojnice, 2 September 2024

- 2 September – A state funeral is held in Chojnice for more than 700 recently discovered victims of Nazi atrocities committed in the Valley of Death during the German occupation of Poland.
- 6 September –
  - Polish prosecutors charge three Belarusian citizens for diverting Ryanair Flight 4978 in 2021 under a fabricated bomb threat to arrest political activist Roman Protasevich and his girlfriend Sofia Sapega.
  - The Polish Armed Forces bestows military ranks to service dogs for the first time in its history.
- 10 September – Prime Minister Donald Tusk condemns Germany's new land border restrictions due to Germany's lack of support for other European Union nations impacted by irregular migration, for not securing the bloc's eastern border against Russian and Belarusian hybrid warfare, and for not supporting Poland's own irregular migration controls.
- 14 September – Following a meeting in Kyiv, the foreign ministers of Poland and Ukraine call for ending social benefits for Ukrainian men in Poland, and for programs in the European Union to return them to Ukraine in order to stop draft evasion.

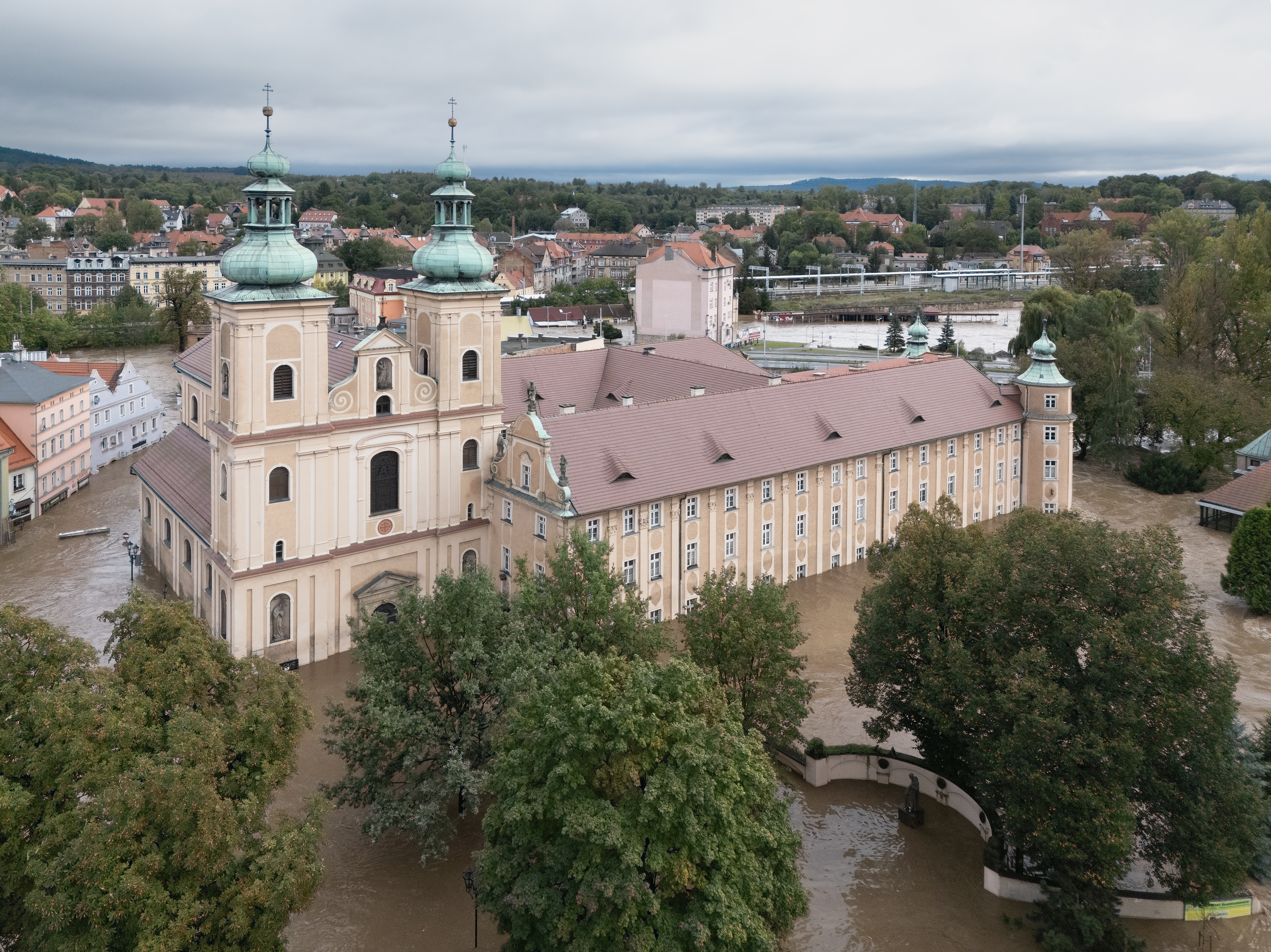
Flood in Kłodzko, 15 September 2024

- 15–27 September – At least nine people are killed amid flooding caused by Storm Boris.

=== October ===
- 3 October – The government introduces a ban on the sale of alcohol at petrol stations from 22:00 to 06:00.
- 6 October – Motor Lublin won their third Team Speedway Polish Championship defeating Sparta Wrocław in the finals (see 2024 Polish speedway season).
- 12 October –
  - Prime Minister Donald Tusk announces plans to temporarily suspend the right of migrants to seek asylum in Poland, citing abuses by people smugglers aided by Belarus and Russia.
  - Sovereign Poland merges with Law and Justice during the PiS congress in Przysucha.
- 18 October – A pileup involving 21 vehicles along Expressway S7 near Gdańsk leaves four people dead and 15 others injured.
- 22 October – The government orders the closure of the Russian consulate in Poznań over allegations of sabotage orchestrated by Moscow.

=== November ===
- 1 November – The first Warszawa M-20 automobile to be produced is unveiled in Otrębusy after it is recovered from Finland.
- 13 November – Naval Support Facility-Redzikowo, which hosts Aegis Ashore missiles operated by the US as part of NATO, is declared operational.
- 18 November – Authorities announce the discovery of polio in the Warsaw sewage system.

=== December ===
- 6 December – The first museum covering LGBTQ history in Poland is opened in Warsaw.
- 7 December – Janusz Waluś (a Polish right-wing extremist who was convicted of the 1993 assassination of Chris Hani, General Secretary of the South African Communist Party (SACP) in South Africa) arrives back in Poland, accompanied by Polish politician Grzegorz Braun during the flight.
- 19 December –The Hungarian government of Viktor Orbán has granted political asylum to Polish MP of Law and Justice Marcin Romanowski, who is wanted on the European Arrest Warrant, because he is accused of defrauding 100 million zł from the Funsusz Sprawiedliwości (Justice Fund) when he was deputy minister of justice during the PiS government.

== Holidays ==
- 1 January - New Year's Day
- 6 January - Epiphany
- 31 March - Easter Sunday
- 1 April - Easter Monday
- 1 May - May Day

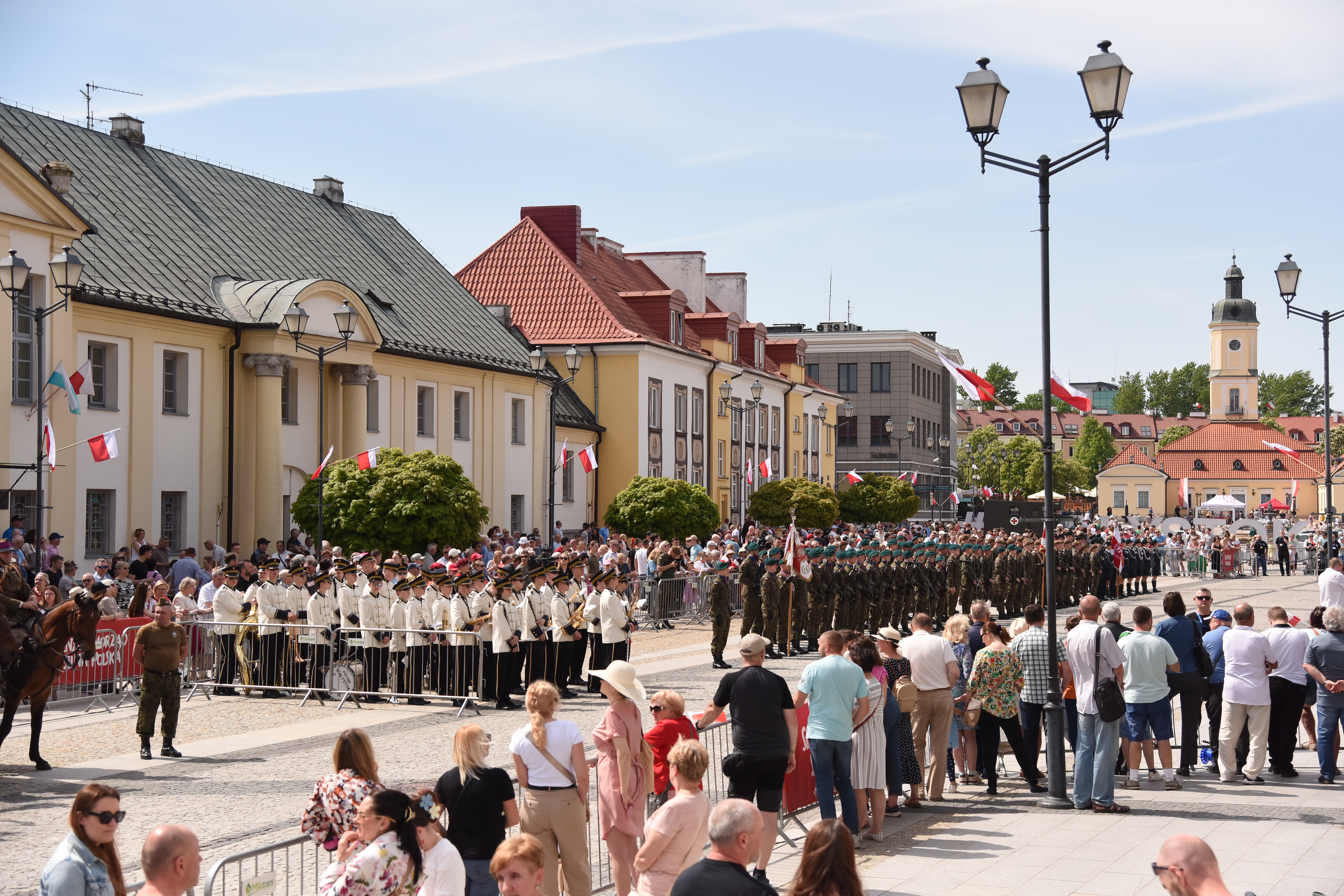
2024 3 May Constitution Day in Białystok

- 3 May - 3 May Constitution Day
- 19 May - Whit Sunday
- 30 May - Corpus Christi
- 15 August - Assumption Day
- 1 November - All Saints' Day
- 11 November - Independence Day
- 25 December - Christmas Day
- 26 December – 2nd Day of Christmas

== Art and entertainment ==
- List of Polish submissions for the Academy Award for Best International Feature Film

== Deaths ==
- 1 January – Iwona Śledzińska-Katarasińska, 82, politician, MP (1991–2023)
- 2 January – Zvi Zamir, 98, Polish-born Israeli military officer, director of the Mossad (1968–1974).
- 4 January – Emil Polit, 83, painter.
- 5 January – Ryszard Karpiński, 88, Roman Catholic prelate, auxiliary bishop of Lublin (1985–2011).
- 7 January – Mateusz Rutkowski, 37, ski jumper.
- 9 January – Tadeusz Isakowicz-Zaleski, 67, Roman Catholic priest and political dissident.
- 10 January – Janusz Majewski, 92, film director (Lokis, Epitafium dla Barbary Radziwiłłówny, Hotel Pacific) and screenwriter.
- 11 January – Marek Litewka, 75, actor (Camera Buff, The Constant Factor).
- 25 January – Bat-Sheva Dagan, 98, Polish-Israeli Holocaust survivor, educator and author.
- 20 October – Janusz Olejniczak, 72, pianist.
