= Auschwitz Supermarket =

Abandoned development proposal

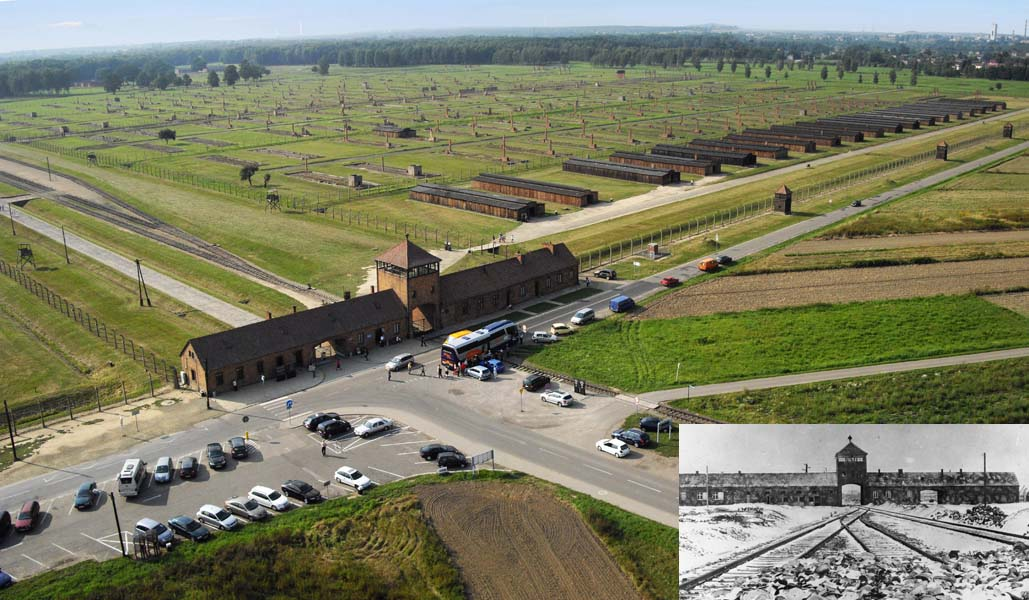
The Auschwitz-Birkenau State Museum

Auschwitz Supermarket was the name given to a development plan proposed to be built across the street from the Auschwitz-Birkenau State Museum. For over 60 years, the land directly across the street from the Museum has been an area of warehouses and other industry facilities. In 1995, a plan was proposed to change this area into an area which the museum could better utilize. The developer, Janusz Marszałek, submitted "a proposal for a parking and retail development." This plan, also known as the Maja Development, was fully supported by the museum.

The plan came into conflict shortly after being submitted. The town where the museum is (and the development was to take place in), Oświęcim, placed more weight behind the retail portion of the project than the parking portion. There was also a translation issue. In Polish, the word 'supermarket' refers to small "mom and pop" shops. When this term was attached to newspaper headlines in Western countries, it conjured the wrong image, bringing scrutiny to the project.

One year later, opposition to the plan was growing. Amidst protests from both international Jewish groups and Israeli politicians, the Polish government decided to halt any further development on the plan. Later that year, Marszałek dropped all plans for the project, with the company leading the development stating it "was abandoning plans for a supermarket."
