= Bat-Sheva Dagan =

Polish-Israeli Holocaust survivor, educator and author (1925–2024)

- בת שבע דגן
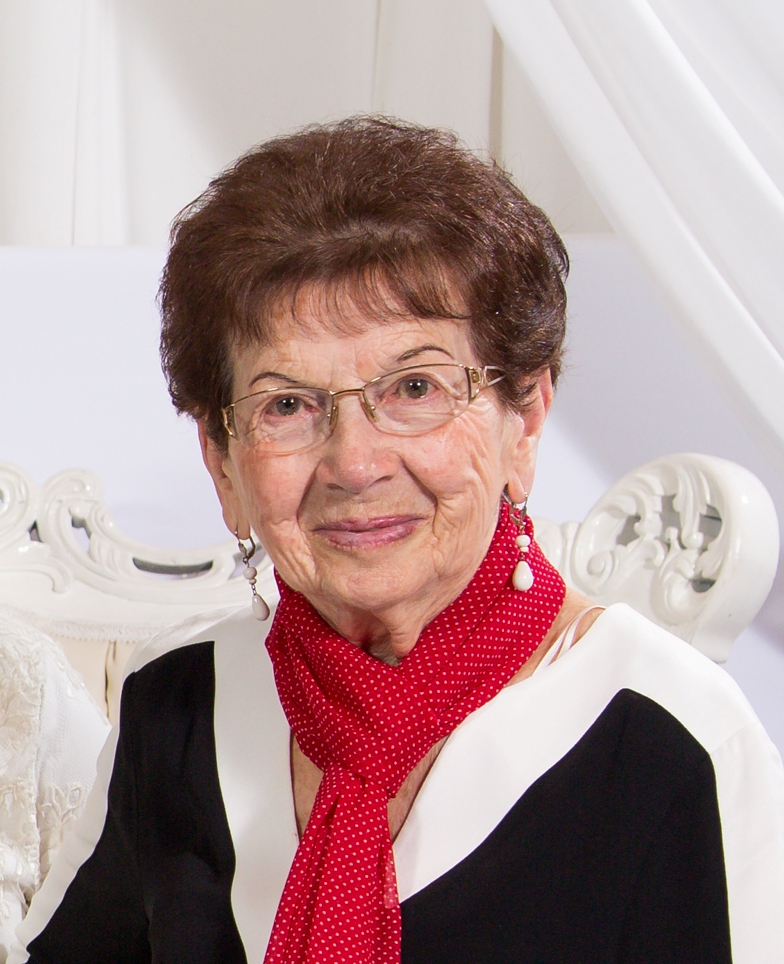
- Dagan in 2016
- Born: Izabella Batszewa Rubinsztajn; 8 September 1925; Łódź, Poland
- Died: 25 January 2024 (aged 98); Bat-Yam, Israel
- Resting place: Zefat, Israel
- Education: Hebrew University of Jerusalem (BA); Columbia University (BA)
- Occupations: Orator, psychologist, writer
- Spouse: Paul Dagan
- Children: 2
- Writing career
- Subjects: Holocaust literature for children and young adults
- Notable awards: Woman of the Year in Education, 2008, Yad Vashem

Bat-Sheva Dagan (Hebrew: בת-שבע דגן; 8 September 1925 – 25 January 2024) was a Polish-Israeli orator, psychologist, and writer. A Holocaust survivor born in Łódź, Poland, she was incarcerated in a ghetto in Radom with her parents and two sisters in 1940. After her parents and a sister were deported and murdered in Treblinka in August 1942, she escaped to Germany, but was discovered, imprisoned, and deported to Auschwitz in May 1943.

After spending 20 months in Auschwitz, she survived two death marches and was liberated by British troops in May 1945. She was the only survivor of her family. She and her husband settled in Israel, where she taught kindergarten and later obtained degrees in educational counseling and psychology. She went on to author books, poems, and songs for children and young adults on Holocaust themes and developed psychological and pedagogical methods for teaching the Holocaust to children. She is considered a pioneer in children's Holocaust education.

== Early life ==
Izabella (Batszewa) Rubinsztajn was born on 8 September 1925, in Łódź, Poland, to Szlomo-Fiszel Rubinsztajn, owner of a textile workshop, and his wife Fajga, a seamstress. She was the eighth of nine siblings – five boys and four girls – and was raised in a traditional Zionist home. She attended a Polish school and was a student in middle school when World War II broke out.

One of her brothers emigrated to Palestine before the war. The outbreak of hostilities sent her other brothers and a sister fleeing to the Soviet Union, while the rest of the family relocated to Radom. In 1940 two ghettos were set up in the city (Radom Ghetto) and she and her family were held in the "large ghetto".

== World War II ==
In the ghetto, Batszewa became a member of the clandestine Hashomer Hatzair Jewish youth group. Their head counselor, Shmuel Breslaw, sent her with Aryan papers to the Warsaw Ghetto to obtain a copy of the movement's underground newspaper Pod Prąd (Against the Current) from Mordechai Anielewicz and bring it back to Radom.

During the liquidation of the "large ghetto" in August 1942, Batszewa's parents and older sister were deported and murdered in the Treblinka extermination camp. She and her younger sister, Sabina, were sent to the "small ghetto" in Radom. The sisters decided to try to escape separately, but Sabina was shot and killed in her attempt. Batszewa escaped and made it to Schwerin, Germany, where she used false papers to get a job as a maid in a Nazi household. After a few months she was discovered, arrested, and imprisoned. In May 1943 she was deported to the Auschwitz concentration camp and tattooed with the number 45554. In the camp she met up with a cousin who worked as a nurse in the prison infirmary and found her a job there. When Batszewa contracted typhus, her cousin sneaked her medicine. Batszewa later worked in the "Canada" commando, sorting the belongings of camp victims. She and the seven other female members of her commando collaborated on a secret newspaper, which they recorded on strips of paper and read to each other on their day off.

As the Red Army approached Auschwitz in January 1945, she was evacuated on a death march to Loslau, and from Loslau she was transpored to the Ravensbrück concentration camp. After 2 month to the Malchow concentration camp. She survived another death march to Lübz, where she was liberated by British troops on 2 May 1945. She was the only one of her siblings to survive the war.

== Postwar ==
After liberation, Batszewa travelled to Brussels. There she met her future husband, a British Army soldier, who gave her a visa to Palestine. She immigrated in September 1945. She and her husband changed their surname from Kornwicz to Dagan in Israel. They resided in Holon and had two sons.

Dagan studied at the Shein Teacher's Seminary in Petah Tikva and afterwards worked for three years as a kindergarten teacher in Tel Aviv and Holon. After her husband's death in 1958 she earned a scholarship from the Ministry of Education and studied at the Hebrew University of Jerusalem from 1960 to 1963, earning her bachelor's degree in educational counseling. In 1968 she embarked on a two-year course of study in the United States, earning a bachelor's degree in psychology at Columbia University.

Upon returning to Israel, Dagan became the manager of the kindergarten section of the psychological services division of the Tel Aviv-Yafo Municipality. She formulated psychological and pedagogical methods to teach the Holocaust to children and young adults. She also taught at her alma mater, the Shein Teachers Seminary, and lectured about the Holocaust in the United States, Canada, and the Soviet Union. In Israel she became active in Holocaust remembrance events, speaking at Yad Vashem and in colleges. In the 1990s she began writing books for children on Holocaust themes.

Dagan died in Bat-Yam, Israel on 25 January 2024, at the age of 98.

== Other activities ==
In the early 1980s Dagan served as an emissary for the Jewish Agency on missions to the United States, Canada, Mexico, England, and the Soviet Union.

Dagan revisited Auschwitz five times. In January 2016, she donated to the Auschwitz-Birkenau Memorial and Museum a miniature good luck charm which she said she had hidden in her straw bedding in Auschwitz the entire time she was incarcerated there. The charm, a pair of leather shoes measuring about 1 centimetre (0.39 in) in length, was crafted by a female German Jewish inmate, who gave it to Batszewa with the words, "Let them carry you to freedom". In January 2020, she spoke at a commemoration at Auschwitz of the camp's liberation 75 years earlier.

== Works ==
The poems I learned in Auschwitz motivated me to write children's books about the Holocaust. And I wrote with the idea that children's books need a happy ending, because I didn't want to rob the children of their faith in mankind.

— Bat-Sheva Dagan, oral testimony

Dagan's literary works include five books on Holocaust themes for children and adults, some of which have been translated into other languages, poems, and songs. Her first two books, published in 1991 and 1992, were Co wydarzyło się w czasie Zagłady. Opowieść rymowana dla dzieci, które chcą wiedzieć (What happened during the Holocaust: Rhymed tale for children who want to know), and Czika, piesek w getcie (Czika, the Dog in the Ghetto). In 2010 the Auschwitz-Birkenau Memorial and Museum republished Czika, piesek w getcie and Gdyby gwiazdy mogły mówić (If Stars Could Talk) together with lesson plans for classroom discussion. Dagan said in an interview that in writing about the Holocaust for children, "I write so as to preserve the mental health of the child. The stories have a happy ending in order not to rob them of their faith in mankind".

In 2010 the Auschwitz-Birkenau Memorial and Museum published a Polish-language collection of Dagan's poems under the title Błogosławiona bądź wyobraźnio – przeklęta bądź. Wspomnienia 'Stamtąd' (Imagination: Blessed Be, Cursed Be: Reminiscences from There). Dagan wrote these poems after the war to describe her experiences as a female teenage prisoner in Auschwitz; she also includes works written by other prisoners during their time in Birkenau, which she had memorized. The collection was first published in Hebrew in 1997 and has also been translated into English. Dagan also wrote children's songs on Holocaust themes.

== Awards and honors ==
In 2008 Dagan was named Woman of the Year in Education by Yad Vashem for her contribution to Holocaust teaching for children. She was also named an Outstanding Member of the City of Holon. In 2012, she was honored as one of the torch lighters at ceremonies marking Yom HaShoah.

== Sources ==
- Friedman, Jonathan C., ed. (2010). The Routledge History of the Holocaust. Routledge. ISBN 978-1-136-87059-0.
