= Muselmann =

Term used among Jewish prisoners in Nazi concentration camps during World War II

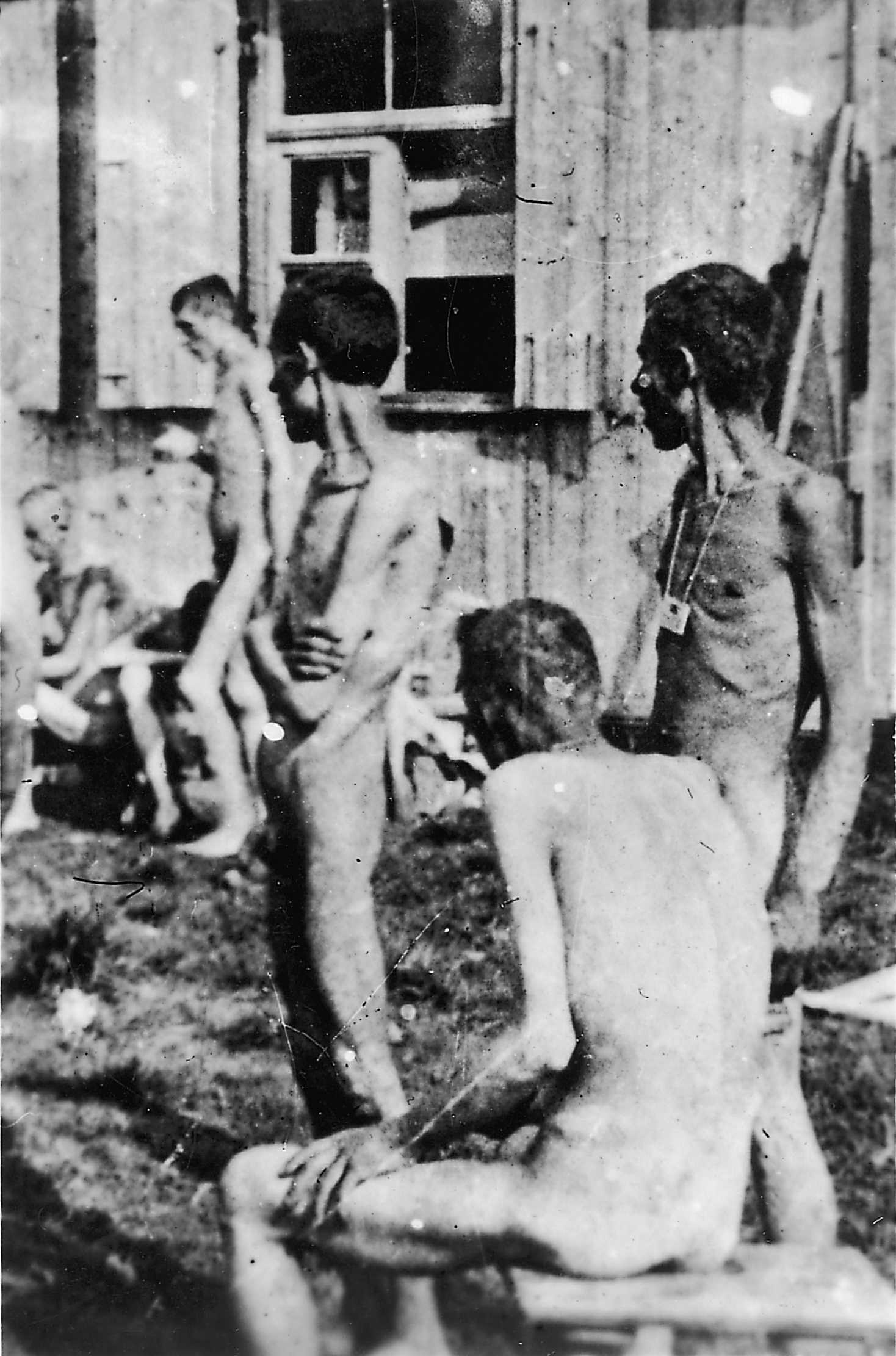
Photograph of inmates at the Buchenwald concentration camp following its liberation, 16 April 1945

Muselmann (German plural Muselmänner) was a term used amongst prisoners of German Nazi concentration camps during the Holocaust of World War II to refer to those suffering from a combination of starvation (known also as "hunger disease") and exhaustion, as well as those who were resigned to their impending death. The Muselmann prisoners exhibited severe emaciation and physical weakness, an apathetic listlessness regarding their own fate, and unresponsiveness to their surroundings owing to their barbaric treatment. Some scholars argue that the term possibly comes from the Muselmanns' inability to stand for any time due to the loss of leg muscle, thus leading them to spend much of their time in a prone position.

== Etymology ==
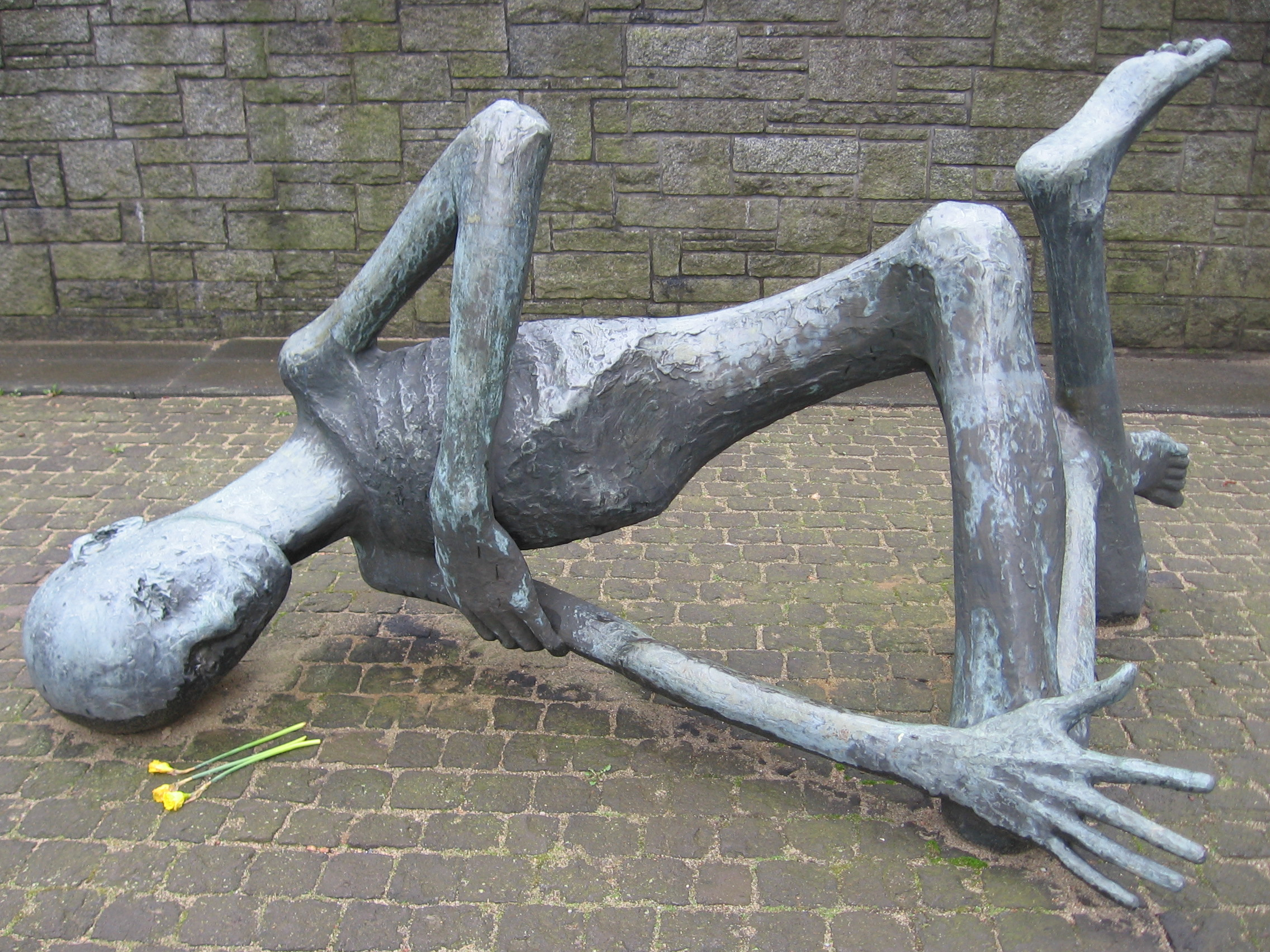
"The Dying Prisoner", Neuengamme Concentration Camp Memorial

"Muselmann" literally means "a Muslim" in Yiddish and a number of other languages (albeit with spelling differences) and ultimately derives from the Old Turkish word for Muslim, مسلمان (müsliman). In the context of this article, "Muselmann" seemingly derives from the German: Muselman, a historical term for "Muslim" (literally "mussulman"), which is now considered derogatory. If this derivation is correct, "Muselmann" would literally mean "Muslim man" (Muselman + Mann); but how this term later came to be used to denote starving concentration camp prisoners is uncertain. Some scholars argue that the term may derive from the Muselmann's inability to stand due to a combination of exhaustion and starvation-induced muscular atrophy in their legs, thus forcing them to spend much of their time in a prone position, which may have evoked the image of the Muslim practice of prostration during prayer, called sujud.

Viktor Frankl, who survived internment in the Auschwitz-Birkenau concentration camp, wrote in his memoirs that the term was first used by camp's prisoners to refer to the Kapos—prisoners assigned to supervise forced labor by the SS guards—as, to them, the term "Muslim" carried a connotation of barbarism. On the other hand, Eugen Kogon, who survived internment in Buchenwald, wrote that the term originated from Nazi staff-members, who ascribed the Muselmanns' apparent apathy to their circumstances (likely the result of weakness and acute hunger) to Islamic fatalism.

Other theories as to the term's origins completely eschew any intimate connection to the notions of Islam, as even by the outbreak of World War II, the term "Muselman" was considered archaic and was rarely used to refer to Muslims. Marie Jalowicz-Simon, a philologist who also survived Nazi persecution, argued that by the 1940s, Muselmann had become a colloquial term for the elderly or infirm, which allowed it to be co-opted into the Nazi vocabulary.

== Usage in literature ==
The American psychologist David P. Boder identified the term "Musselman" in 1946 while interviewing camp survivors in Europe. He asked them to describe, spell, and pronounce the word for camp inmates so emaciated that they had lost the will to live.

Primo Levi tried to explain the term (he also uses "Musselman") in a footnote of If This Is a Man (the commonly found English translation is titled Survival in Auschwitz), his autobiographical account of his time in Auschwitz:

This word 'Muselmann', I do not know why, was used by the old ones of the camp to describe the weak, the inept, those doomed to selection.

— Primo Levi, If This Is a Man, chapter "The Drowned and the Saved".

Their life is short, but their number is endless: they, the Muselmanner, the drowned form the backbone of the camp, an anonymous mass, continually renewed and always identical, of non men who march and labour in silence, the divine spark dead within them, already too empty to really suffer. One hesitates to call them living: one hesitates to call their death death, in the face of which they have no fear, as they are too tired to understand ...

— Primo Levi, If This Is a Man

The psychologist and Auschwitz survivor Viktor Frankl, in his book Man's Search for Meaning, provides the example of a prisoner who decides to use up his last cigarettes (used as currency in the concentration camps) in the evening because he is convinced he won't survive the Appell (roll call assembly) the next morning; his fellow captives derided him as a "Muselmann." Frankl compares this to the dehumanized behavior and attitudes of the kapos.

Italian philosopher Giorgio Agamben defined his key examples of 'bare life,' the Muselmann and the patient in an overcoma, in relation to their passivity and inertia. The Muselmann was for him "a being from whom humiliation, horror and fear had so taken away all consciousness and personality as to make him absolutely apathetic", "[m]ute and absolutely alone ... without memory and without grief."

The testimonial of Polish witness Adolf Gawalewicz, Refleksje z poczekalni do gazu: ze wspomnień muzułmana ("Reflections in the Gas Chamber's Waiting Room: From the Memoirs of a Muselmann"), published in 1968, incorporates the term in the title of the work.

Canadian Jewish author Eli Pfefferkorn published a novel in 2011 with the title The Muselmann at the Water Cooler.

The narrator of British author Michael Moorcock's Pyat Quartet is a concentration camp survivor who frequently states "I will not become a musselman" when recalling past traumas. The narrative intentionally plays on the etymology of the term, as the titular Pyat is a subject focus with the Ottoman conquest of Constantinople.

The word Musselman is frequently used in a demeaning manner. For example, in his book Man's Search for Meaning, author and Holocaust survivor Viktor Frankl berates the attitudes of those who fit his definition of the word "Musselman" by associating the word with those who are unable to psychologically endure the brutal tactics utilized by the Nazis.

== Origin and alternative slang terms ==
The term spread from Auschwitz-Birkenau to other concentration camps. Its equivalent in the Majdanek concentration camp was "Gamel" (derived from the German "gammeln," colloquial for "rotting"), and in the Stutthof concentration camp Krypel (derived from the German "Krüppel," "cripple"). When prisoners reached this emaciated condition, they were selected by camp doctors and murdered by gas, bullets, or various other methods.

In the Soviet Gulags, the term "dokhodyaga" (Russian доходяга, "goner") was used for someone in a similar situation.

== Action 14f13 ==
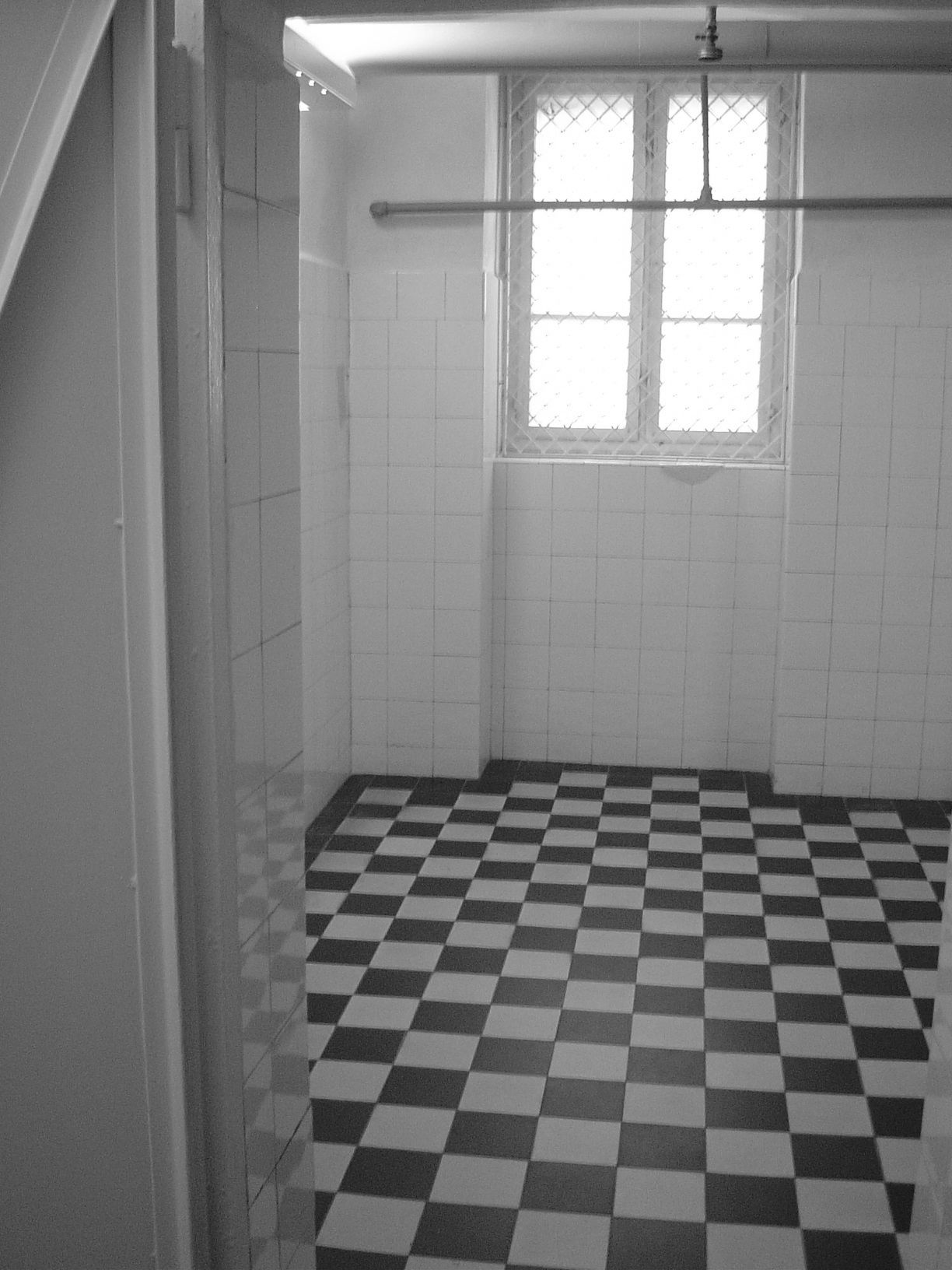
Gas chamber at the Bernburg Euthanasia Centre

Those prisoners considered "Muselmänner" and thus unable to work were also very likely to be labelled "excess ballast" inside the concentration camps. In spring 1941 Heinrich Himmler expressed his desire to relieve concentration camps of sick prisoners and those no longer able to work. Aktion T4, a "euthanasia" program for mentally ill, disabled, and other inmates of hospitals and nursing homes who were deemed unworthy of life, was extended to include the weakest concentration-camp prisoners. Himmler, together with Philipp Bouhler, transferred technology and techniques used in the Aktion T4 programme to the concentration camps, and later to Einsatzgruppen and death camps.

The first concentration-camp victims of this program were gassed by carbon monoxide poisoning and the first known selection took place in April 1941 at Sachsenhausen concentration camp. By the summer of 1941 at least 400 prisoners from Sachsenhausen had been "retired". The scheme operated under the Concentration Camps Inspector and the Reichsführer-SS under the name "Sonderbehandlung 14f13". The combination of numbers and letters is derived from the SS record-keeping system and consists of the number "14" for the Concentration Camps Inspector, the letter "f" for the German word for "deaths" (Todesfälle), and the number "13" for the cause of death, in this case "special treatment," a bureaucratic euphemism for gassing.

== See also ==
- KZ Syndrome
- Ka-tzetnik
