= Halina Birenbaum =

Polish-born Israeli Holocaust survivor

Halina Birenbaum הלינה בירנבאום
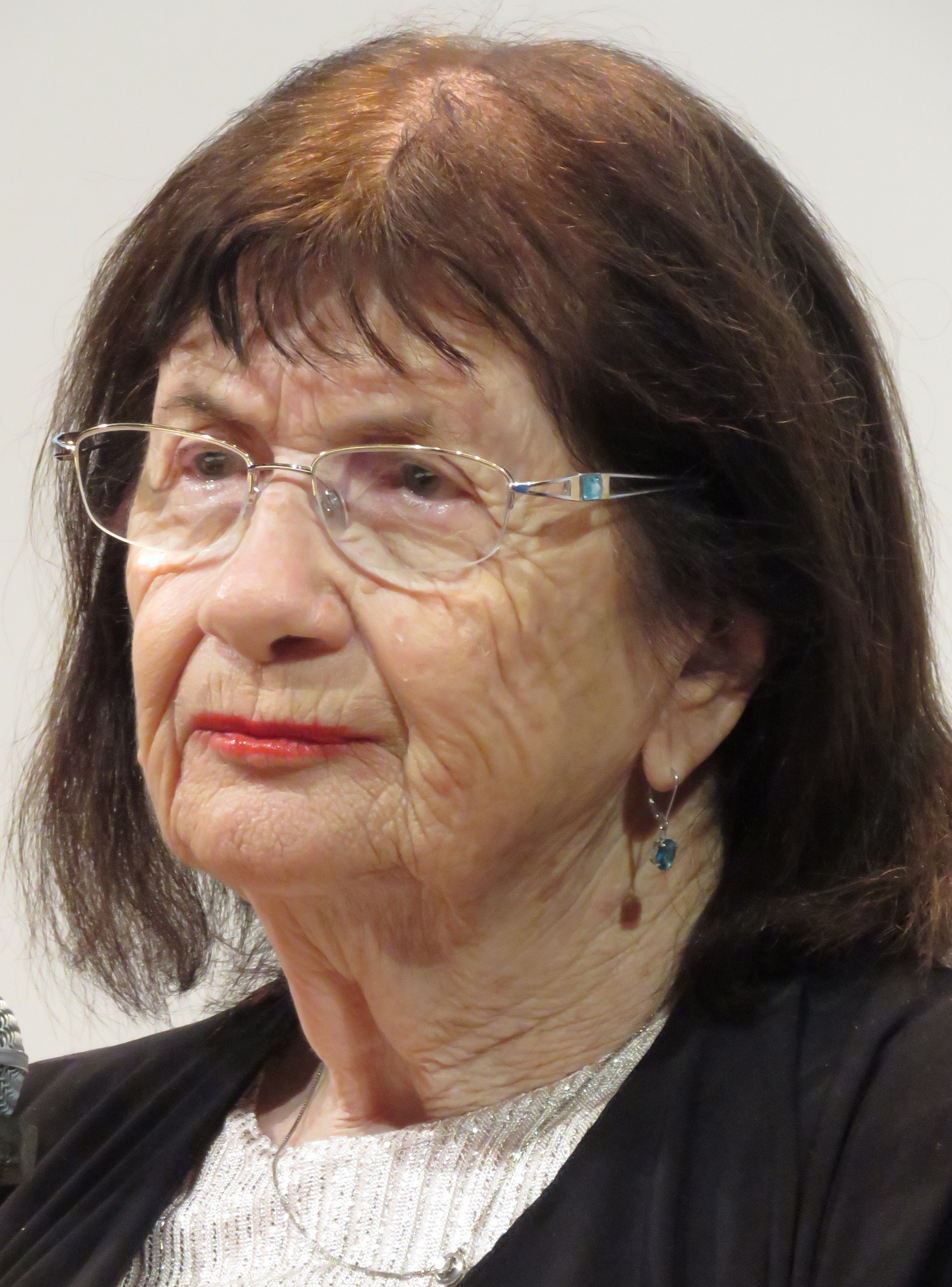
- Birenbaum in 2019
- Born: Halina Grynsztajn; 15 September 1929 (age 97); Warsaw, Poland
- Known for: writing, poetry
- Notable work: Hope is the last to die (Nadzieja umiera ostatnia)
- Spouse: Chaim Birenbaum
- Children: 2
- Awards: Officer of Polonia Restituta

Halina Birenbaum (Hebrew: הלינה בירנבאום; nee Grynsztajn, born 15 September 1929) is a Polish-born Israeli Holocaust survivor, writer, poet, translator and activist.

== Life ==
Born in Warsaw, to Jakub Grynsztajn and Pola formerly Perl, née Kijewska, she was the youngest of three and the only daughter. After the occupation of Poland by Germany, the family's home was in area that was part of the Warsaw Ghetto. After its destruction in July 1943 they were briefly transferred to Majdanek, then on to Auschwitz. She survived forced evacuation of the camp, the Death March of January 1945, from Auschwitz to Wodzisław Śląski, from which she was transported to Ravensbrück and in February on to Neustadt-Glewe, from where she was liberated by the Red Army in May 1945. Her mother was murdered in Majdanek while her father and brothers were murdered in the Treblinka extermination camp.

In 1947, due to antisemitism, she emigrated to Israel, where she married Chaim Birenbaum and had two sons. Until the end of 1950 she worked on a kibbutz. She spends much of her time talking about her early experiences with Israeli, Polish and German youth.

== Writing ==
Life and death during the German occupation of Poland and the martyrdom of Polish Jewry in ghettos and extermination camps are the salient themes of her prose and poetic output. Her works, which are partly written in Polish and partly in Hebrew, have been translated into many languages, including, English French, German, Japanese and Spanish.

== Awards ==
- In 1999 the Polish President, Aleksander Kwaśniewski awarded her the Order of Officer of Polonia Restituta
- In March 2001 she was named Person of Reconciliation 2001 by the Polish Council of Christians and Jews.
- In 2015 she was recognized for her services to Warsaw, Zasłużony dla Warszawy.
- In 2018 she was granted the "Freedom of the City of Warsaw", Honorowi Obywatele miasta stołecznego Warszawy.

== Bibliography ==
=== Books ===
- Hope is the last to die (Nadzieja umiera ostatnia), 1967. Translated into English, German, French, Italian, Spanish, Japanese, and Hebrew
- Return to ancestors' land (Powrót do ziemi praojców), 1991
- Scream for remembrance (Wołanie o pamięć), 1999
- Far and near echoes. Meetings with young people(Echa dalekie i bliskie. Spotkania z młodzieżą), 2001
- Life is dear to everyone (Życie każdemu drogie), 2005
- My life began from the end. Collected Poems Of A Holocaust Survivor. (Moje życie zaczęło się od końca. Wiersze Zebrane Poetki Ocalałej Z Zagłady), 2010
- They still ask (Wciąż pytają) 2011
- I am looking for life in the dead, Interview with Halina Birenbaum (Szukam życia u umarłych, Wywiad z Haliną Birenbaum ISBN 978-83-7704-061-4), 2013
- It's not the rain, it's people (To nie deszcz, to ludzie. Halina Birenbaum w rozmowie z Moniką Tutak-Goll, Wydawnictwo Agora, Warszawa 2019 ISBN 978-83-268-2837-9), 2019
- From history of my life after The Shoah. Memories. (Z historii mojego życia po Zagładzie. Wspomnienia. Wydawnictwo Anna Maria Mickiewicz Literary Waves Publishing, London 2022 ISBN 978-1-4716-3460-4), 2022

=== Poems ===
- Even when I laugh (Nawet gdy się śmieję)
- Not about flowers (Nie o Kwiatach)
- Words cannot convey (Jak można w słowach)
