= Kazimierz Smoleń =

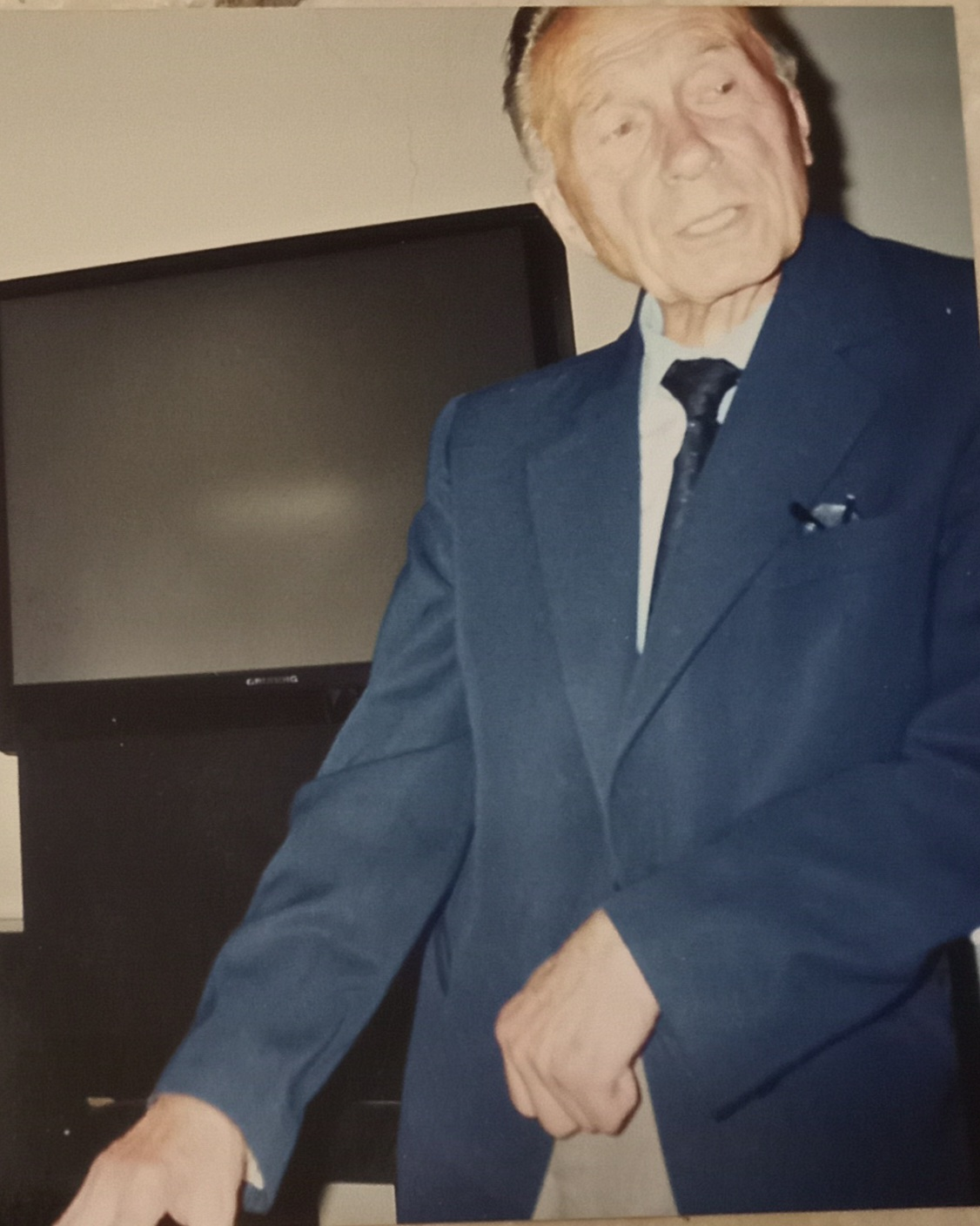
Image of Kazimierz Smoleń

Kazimierz Smoleń (19 April 1920 – 27 January 2012) was a Polish political prisoner of the Nazi World War II KZ Auschwitz (Auschwitz concentration camp), and later a long-term director of Auschwitz-Birkenau State Museum.

== Biography ==
Smoleń was a law student when he was arrested by the Gestapo on 15 April 1940 for his activity in the Polish conspiracy in Chorzów and an attempt to join the Polish army abroad. On 6 July 1940 he was transported to Auschwitz concentration camp with one of the first transports of Polish political prisoners to arrive from prison in Sosnowiec.

Smoleń was given the KZ Auschwitz number 1327, and at first was given work in the construction workgang; then he worked as a writer in the camp's administration office. Altogether Smoleń was an Auschwitz prisoner for almost five years. On 18 January 1945 Smoleń was deported in one of Auschwitz death marches to Loslau and then to Ebensee concentration camp, a subcamp of Mauthausen-Gusen concentration camp. Smoleń was liberated in Ebensee concentration camp on 6 May 1945.

Smoleń came back to Poland after the war and studied law at the Catholic University of Lublin. He was one of the creators of the Auschwitz-Birkenau State Museum, established in 1947. From 1955 till 1990 he served as the director of the Museum.

After the war he worked on the Commission to Investigate Nazi Crimes in Poland and participated as a witness and expert in trials of SS staff of Nazi concentration camps. After retirement, he was still devoted to education about Auschwitz, and worked witnessing about the camp's history to younger generations until his very last days. Smoleń died on 27 January 2012, aged 91, the day of the 67th Anniversary of the liberation of Auschwitz-Birkenau.

== Bibliography ==
- Kazimierz Smoleń. Auschwitz, 1940-1945. Route Sixty Six Publishing, 1995.
- K. Smoleń, translated by Stephen Lee. Auschwitz-Birkenau, State Museum in Oswiecim, Guide Book. Panstwowe Museum, 2007.
- K. Smoleń. Selected Problems from the History of KL Auschwitz. Panstwowe Museum, 1979.
