= Active Measures =

Active Measures may refer to:

- Active measures, political warfare conducted by the Russian or Soviet government
- Active Measures (film), a 2018 documentary on 2016 US election interference
- "Active Measures" (Homeland), a 2018 TV episode
- "Active Measures", a 2015 episode of NCIS: Los Angeles
- Active Measures, a 2020 book by political scientist Thomas Rid
