= Mysłowice-Wesoła Coal Mine =

Coal mine in Katowice, Silesian Voivodeship, Poland

Mysłowice-Wesoła coal mine
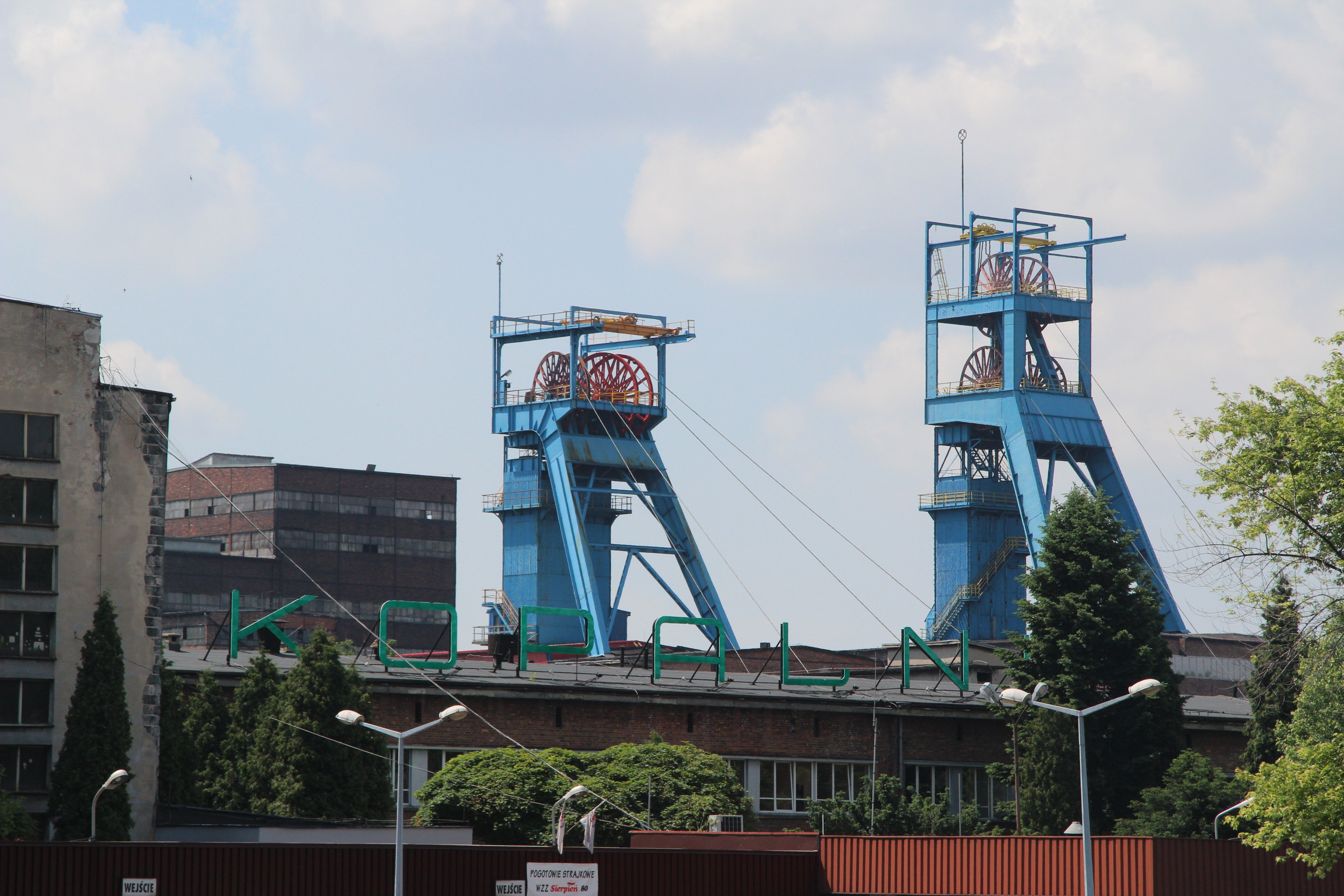
- Mysłowice-Wesoła coal mine, winding towers of the Piotr and Bronisław shafts (2013)

- Location within Poland
- Location: Katowice, Silesian Voivodeship, Poland; 50°13′28.45″N 19°2′56.34″E
- Products: Coal
- Production: 3,000,000
- Opened: 2006
- Company: Katowicki Holding Węglowy

The Mysłowice-Wesoła coal mine is a large mine in the south of Poland in Katowice, Silesian Voivodeship, 260 km south-west of the capital, Warsaw. Mysłowice-Wesoła represents one of the largest coal reserves in Poland having estimated reserves of 232 million tonnes of coal. Its annual coal production is around 3 million tonnes.
