= Auschwitz-Birkenau State Museum =

Museum and memorial in Oświęcim, Poland

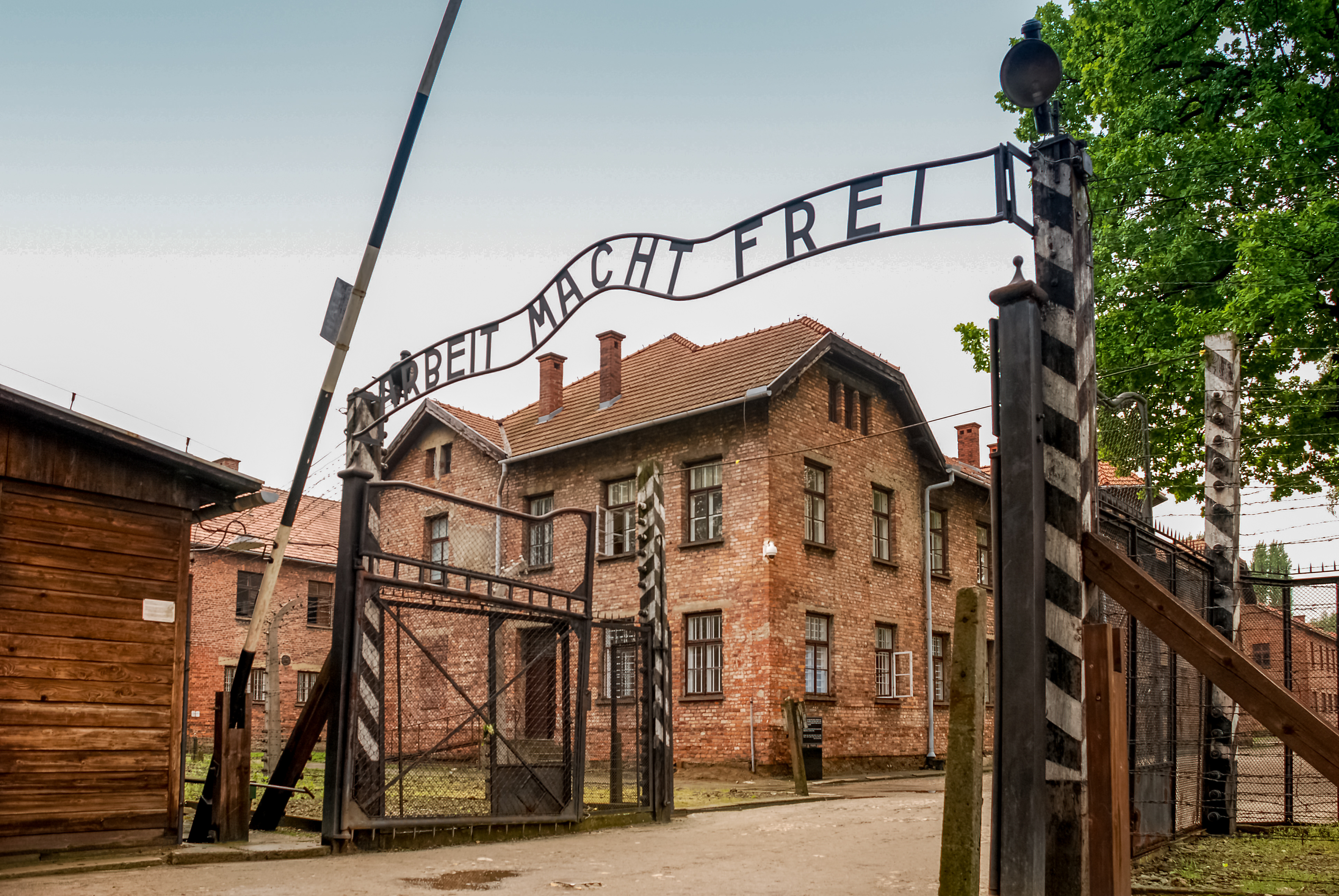
- Entrance to Auschwitz I, 2010
- Established: July 2, 1947
- Location: Oświęcim, Poland
- Visitors: 2.3 million (2019)
- Director: Piotr Cywiński
- Website: auschwitz.org/en/

UNESCO World Heritage Site
- Official name: Auschwitz Birkenau German Nazi Concentration and Extermination Camp (1940–1945)
- Includes: 1. Auschwitz; 2. Birkenau
- Criteria: Cultural: (vi)
- Reference: 31
- Inscription: 1979 (3rd Session)
- Area: 191.97 ha (474.4 acres)
- Coordinates: 50°2′20″N 19°10′30″E

The Auschwitz-Birkenau State Museum (Polish: Państwowe Muzeum Auschwitz-Birkenau) is a museum on the site of the Auschwitz concentration camp in Oświęcim, Poland, which was operated by Nazi Germany.

The site includes the main concentration camp at Auschwitz I and the remains of the concentration and extermination camp at Auschwitz II-Birkenau. Both were developed and run by Nazi Germany during its occupation of Poland in 1939–1945. The Polish government has preserved the site as a research centre and in memory of the 1.1 million people who died there, including 960,000 Jews, during World War II and the Holocaust. It became a World Heritage Site in 1979. Piotr Cywiński has served as the museum's director since 2006.

== Overview ==
The museum was created in April 1946 by Tadeusz Wąsowicz and other former Auschwitz prisoners, acting under the direction of Poland's Ministry of Culture and Art. It was formally founded on July 2, 1947, by an act of the Polish parliament. The site consists of 20 hectares (49 acres) in Auschwitz I and 171 hectares (420 acres) in Auschwitz II, which lies about three kilometres from the main camp. Over 25 million people have visited the museum. From 1955 to 1990, the museum was directed by one of its founders and former inmates, Kazimierz Smoleń.

In 2019, 2,320,000 people visited the site, including visitors from Poland (at least 396,000), the United Kingdom (200,000), United States (120,000), Italy (104,000), Germany (73,000), Spain (70,000), France (67,000), Israel (59,000), Ireland (42,000), and Sweden (40,000).

== History ==
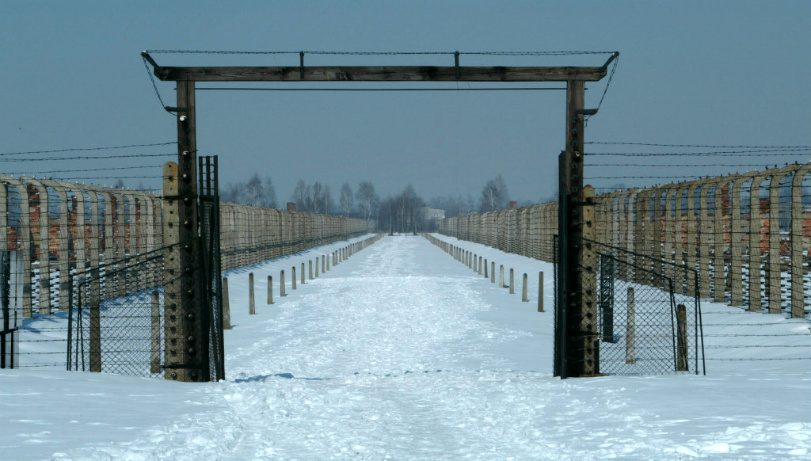
Gate in Auschwitz II-Birkenau

The first exhibition in the barracks opened in 1947. In Stalinist Poland, on the seventh anniversary of the first deportation of Polish captives to Auschwitz, the exhibition was revised with the assistance of former inmates. The exhibition was influenced by the Cold War and next to pictures of Jewish ghettos, photos of slums in the US were presented. After Stalin's death, a new exhibition was planned in 1955. In 1959, every nation that had victims in Auschwitz received the right to present its own exhibition. However, victims like homosexuals, Jehovah's Witnesses, Sinti and Roma, and Yeniche people did not receive these rights. The state of Israel was also refused the allowance for its own exhibition as the murdered Jews in Auschwitz were not citizens of Israel. In April 1968, the Jewish exhibition, designed by Andrzej Szczypiorski, was opened. In 1979, Pope John Paul II held a mass in Birkenau and called the camp a "Golgotha of our times".

In 1962, a prevention zone around the museum in Birkenau (and in 1977, one around the museum in Auschwitz) was established to maintain the historical condition of the camp. These zones were confirmed by the Polish parliament in 1999. In 1967, the first big memorial monument was inaugurated and in the 1990s the first information boards were set up.

=== National exhibitions ===
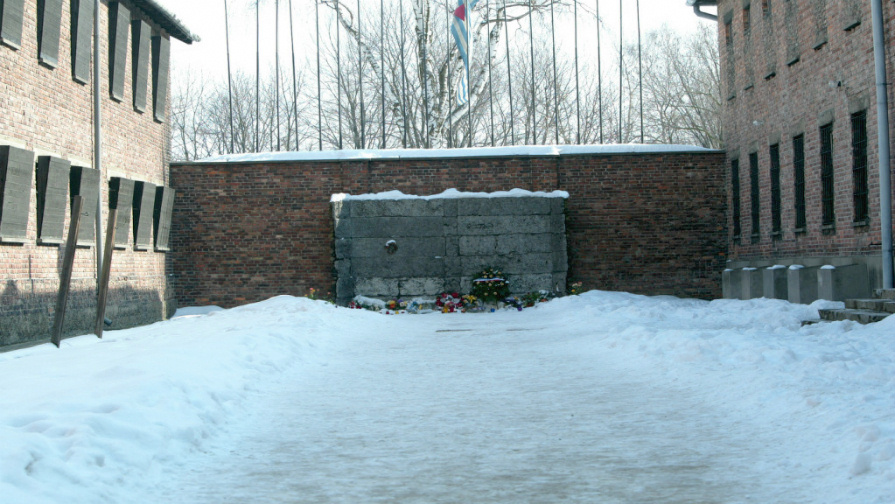
The Auschwitz death wall, where inmates were executed, was located near block 11 in Auschwitz I.

Since 1960, the so-called "national exhibitions" have been located in Auschwitz I. Most of them were renewed from time to time; for example, those of Belgium, France, Hungary, Netherlands, Slovakia, Czech Republic, and the former Soviet Union. The German exhibition, which was made by the former GDR, has not been renewed.

The first national exhibition of the Soviet Union was opened in 1961, and renewed in 1977 and 1985. In 2003, the Russian organizing committee suggested presenting a completely new exhibition. The Soviet part of the museum was closed, but the reopening was delayed due to the varying territorial situation of the Soviet Union between 1939 and 1941. The question of the territories annexed by the USSR during the war, i.e. the Baltic countries, eastern Poland, and Moldova, could not be solved. The Yugoslav pavilion and exhibition, which memorialized Auschwitz victims primarily through their antifascist struggle, was opened in 1963. In 2002, Croatia, one of Yugoslav successor states, notified the Auschwitz Memorial Museum that it wanted the Yugoslav exhibition dismantled, demanding permission to establish its own national exhibition. The museum rejected the proposal and notified all Yugoslav successor states that only a joint renovated exhibit would be appropriate. Since the countries failed to do so, the Yugoslav exhibition was closed down in 2009 and its contents sent to the Museum of Yugoslavia in Belgrade, while Block 17, which hosted the exhibition, remains empty. In January 2024, the UNESCO announced that after 14 years of negotiations, six successor states of SFR Yugoslavia — Bosnia and Herzegovina, Croatia, Montenegro, North Macedonia, Serbia and Slovenia — had reached an agreement to reopen a joint exhibition about the Holocaust in Yugoslavia.

In 1978, Austria opened its own exhibition, presenting itself as a victim of National Socialism. This one-sided view motivated Austrian political scientist Andreas Maislinger to work in the museum within the Action Reconciliation Service for Peace organization in 1980-81. Later he founded the Austrian Holocaust Memorial Service, the Gedenkdienst. Austrian President Rudolf Kirchschläger had advised Maislinger that as a young Austrian, he did not need to atone for anything in Auschwitz. Due to the disapproving attitude of Austrian officials, the Austrian Holocaust Memorial Service could not be launched before September 1992.

=== Filming ===
The museum has allowed scenes for four films to be filmed on the site: Pasażerka (1963) by Polish director Andrzej Munk, Landscape After the Battle (1970) by Polish director Andrzej Wajda, the War and Remembrance television miniseries (1988), and Denial (2016). Although the Polish government permitted the construction of film sets on its grounds to shoot scenes for Schindler's List (1993), director Steven Spielberg chose to build a "replica" camp entrance outside the infamous archway for the scene in which the train arrives carrying the women who were saved by Oskar Schindler.

=== Religious disputes ===
In 1979, newly elected Polish Pope John Paul II celebrated mass on the grounds of Auschwitz II to some 500,000 people, and announced that Edith Stein would be beatified. Some Catholics erected a cross near Bunker 2 of Auschwitz II where she had been gassed. A short while later, a Star of David appeared at the site, leading to a proliferation of religious symbols, which were eventually removed.

Carmelite nuns opened a convent near Auschwitz I in 1984. After some Jewish groups called for the removal of the convent, representatives of the Catholic Church agreed in 1987. One year later, the Carmelites erected an 8 m (26 ft) tall cross from the 1979 mass near their site, just outside Block 11 and barely visible from within the camp. This led to protests by Jewish groups, who said that mostly Jews were killed at Auschwitz and demanded that religious symbols be kept away from the site. The Catholic Church told the Carmelites to move by 1989, but they remained until 1993, leaving the cross behind. In 1998, after further calls to remove the cross, some 300 smaller crosses were erected by local activists near the large one, leading to further protests and heated exchanges. Following an agreement between the Polish Catholic Church and the Polish government, the smaller crosses were removed in 1999, but a large papal one remains.

=== Liberation day anniversaries ===
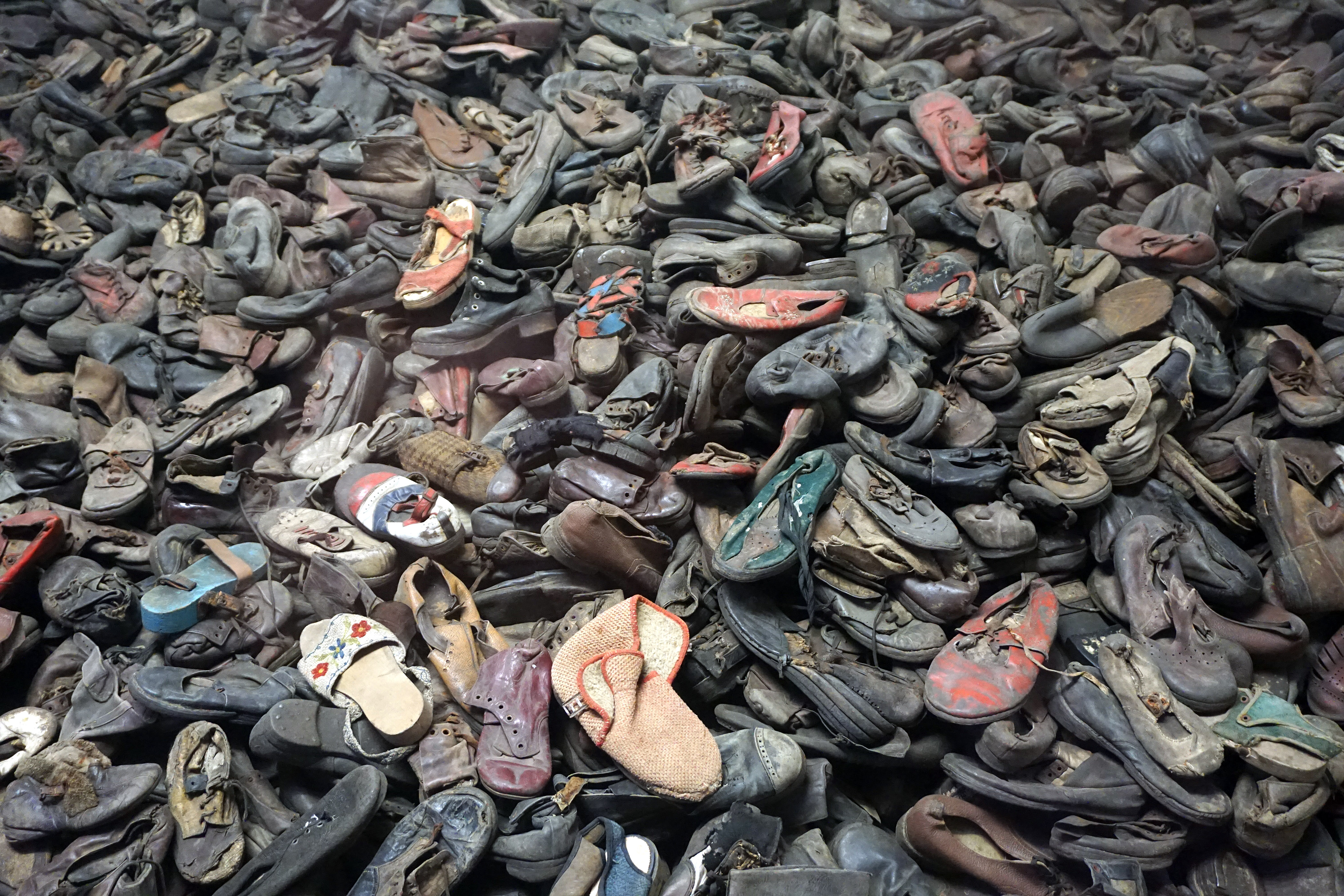
Shoes of victims of Auschwitz I in the museum

In 1995, the 50th anniversary of the liberation ceremony was held in Auschwitz I, with approximately one thousand ex-prisoners in attendance. In 1996, Germany made 27 January, the day of the liberation of Auschwitz, the official day for the commemoration of the victims of National Socialism. Countries that have adopted similar memorial days include Denmark (Auschwitz Day), Italy (Memorial Day), and Poland (Memorial Day for the Victims of Nazism).

A commemoration was held for the 70th anniversary of the liberation in 2015. On the 78th anniversary of the camp's liberation in 2023, the Russian delegation to Poland was not invited, due to the country's invasion of Ukraine.

== Visiting the museum ==
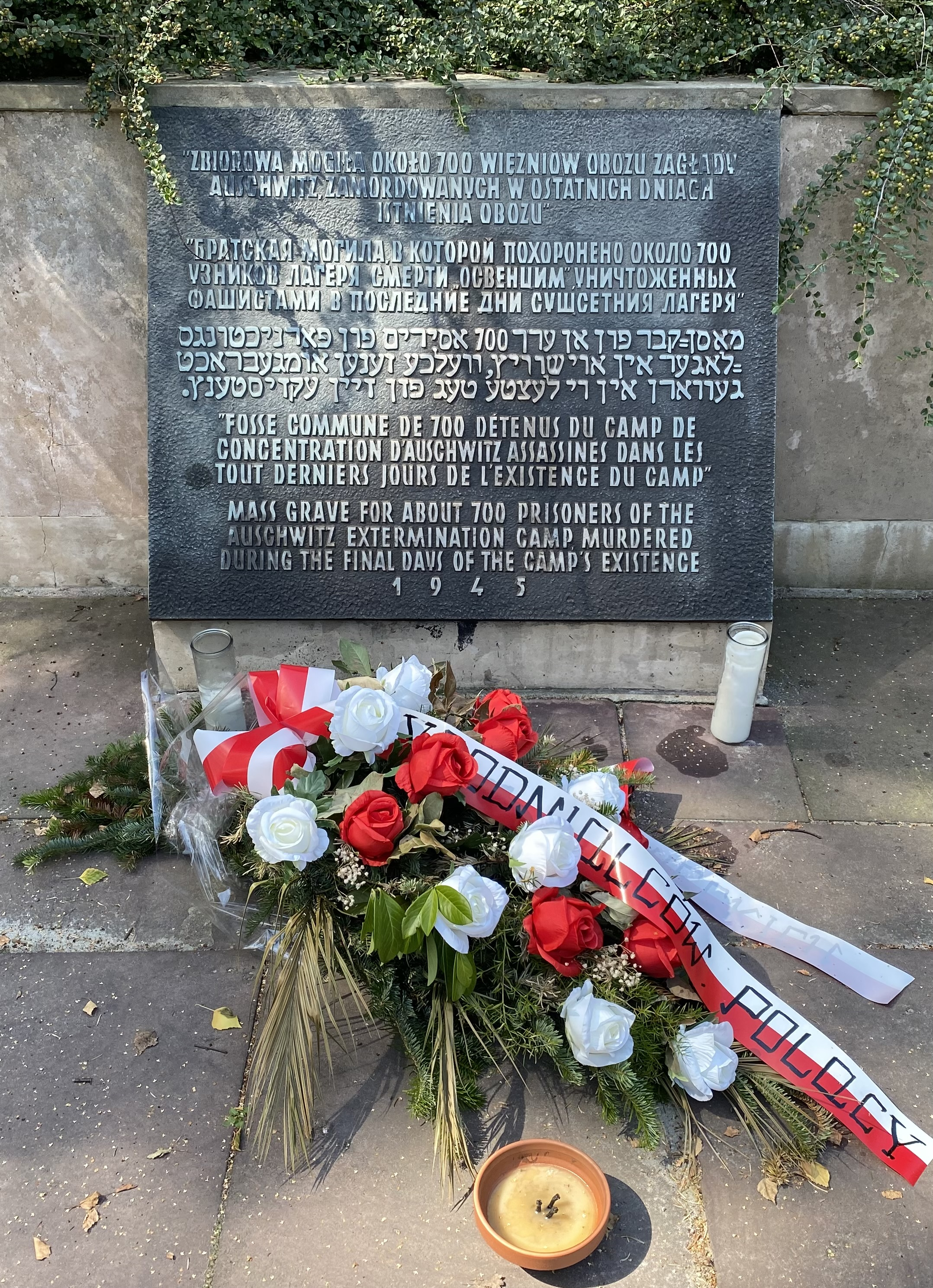
Memorial to the last 700 prisoners killed in the final days of Auschwitz I's operation, located outside the car park of Auschwitz I

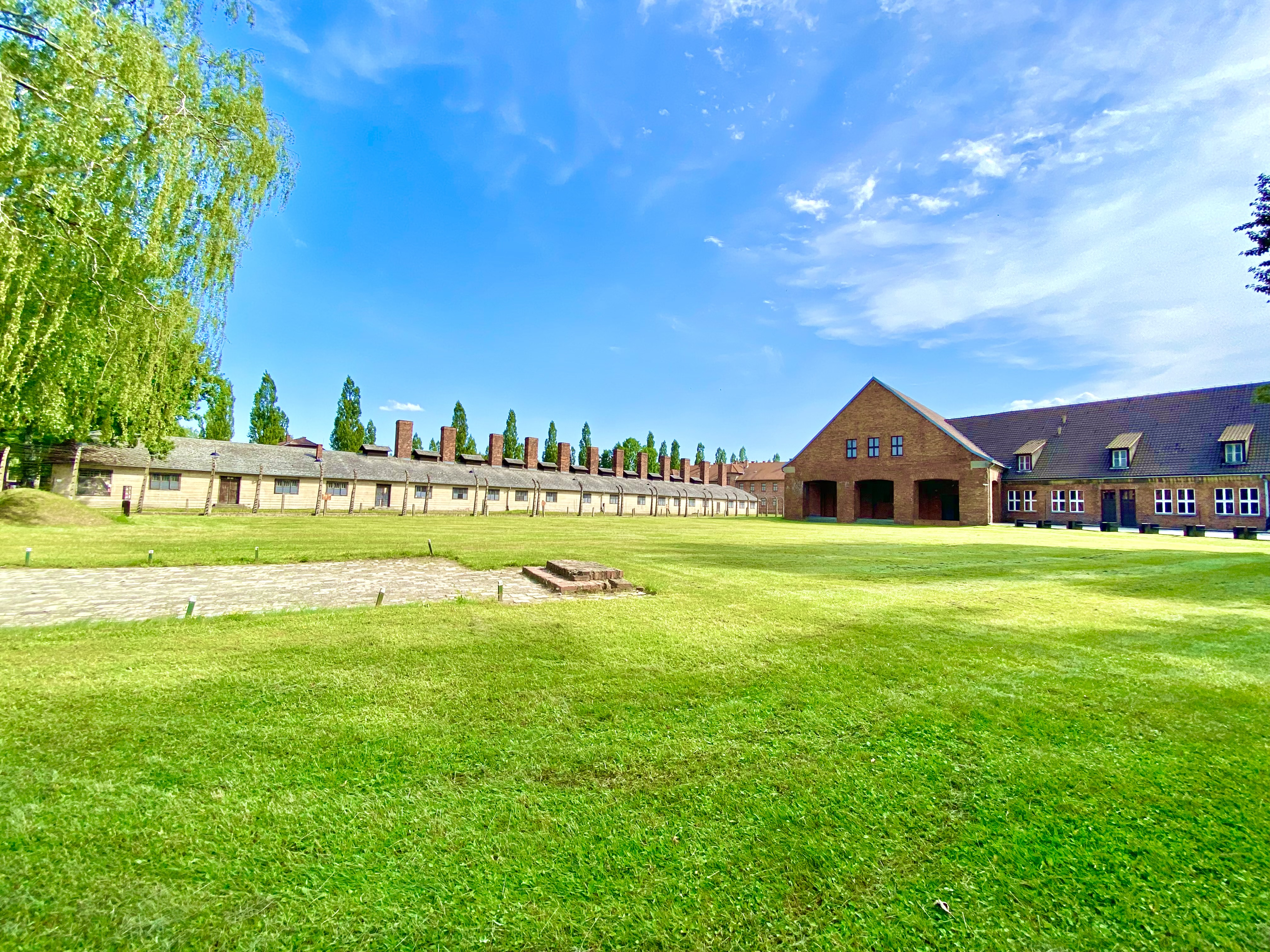
Killing field at the entrance of Auschwitz I where thousands of prisoners were shot during the camp's operation

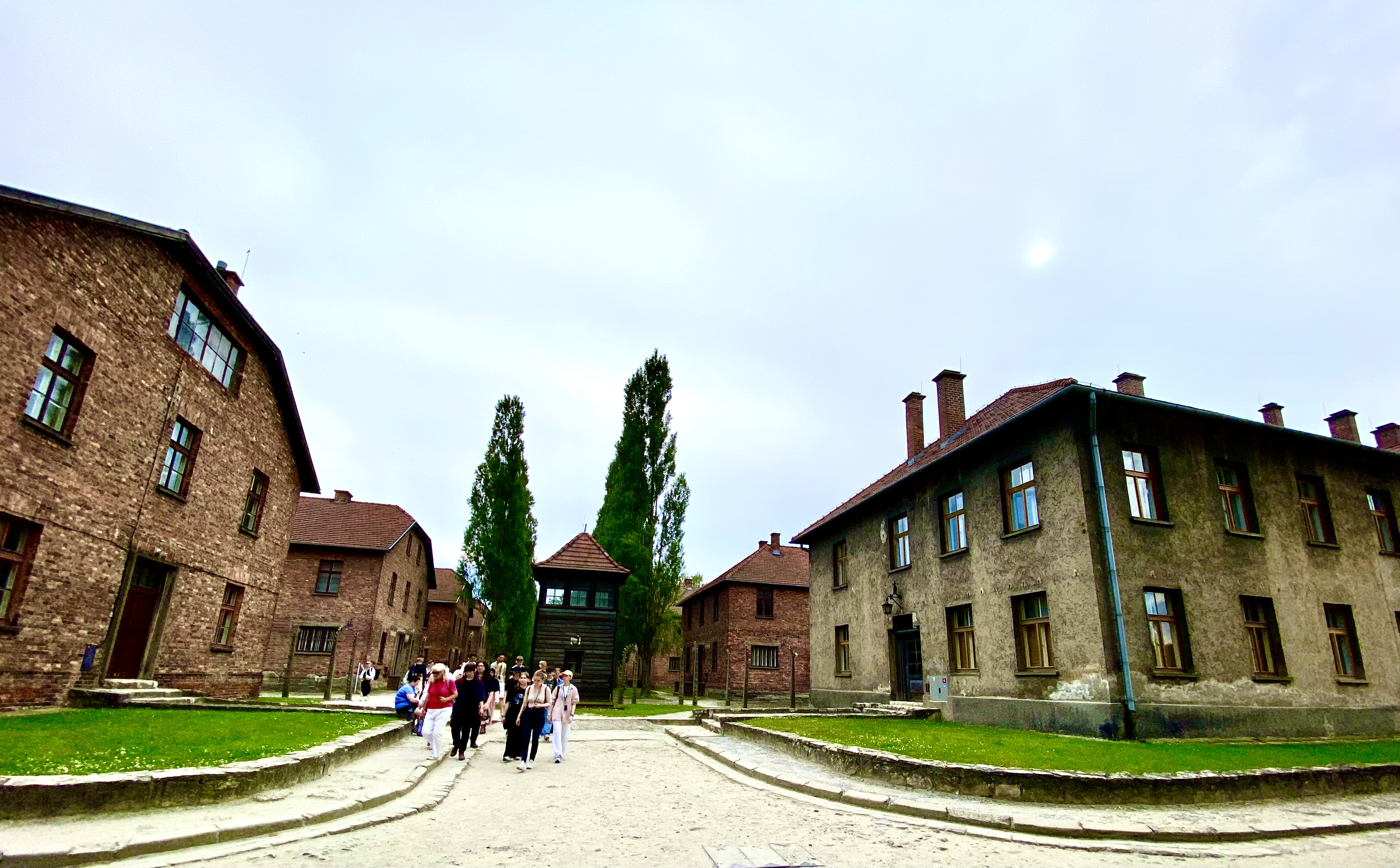
Barracks and checkpoints on the premise of Auschwitz I

Entry to both parts of the museum is free, with entry passes required for all visitors; these can be acquired by online purchase or drop-in. Entrance security screening is operated at Auschwitz I, in which the vast majority of exhibitions, including the former gas chamber and crematorium, are located.

Guided tours are the most common visiting method; each are estimated to last around three hours. There are limited free entry passes each day due to reportedly high demand, and reservations are allowed up to 90 days prior to the desired visit date. Guided tours in English are not always available. Unguided individual visits are possible, depending on entry pass availability on a given day. Auschwitz I is situated nearly 2 km south of the Oświęcim train station, while free shuttle buses commute between the Auschwitz I and II every 10 minutes.

== UNESCO name change ==
The Polish Foreign Ministry has voiced objections to the use of the expression "Polish death camp" in relation to Auschwitz, due to its suggestion that Poland rather than Germany perpetrated the Holocaust. In June 2007, the United Nations World Heritage Committee changed its own name for the site from "Auschwitz Concentration Camp" to "Auschwitz Birkenau", with the subtitle "German Nazi Concentration and Extermination Camp (1940–1945)".

== Recent events ==
=== Arbeit macht frei sign theft ===
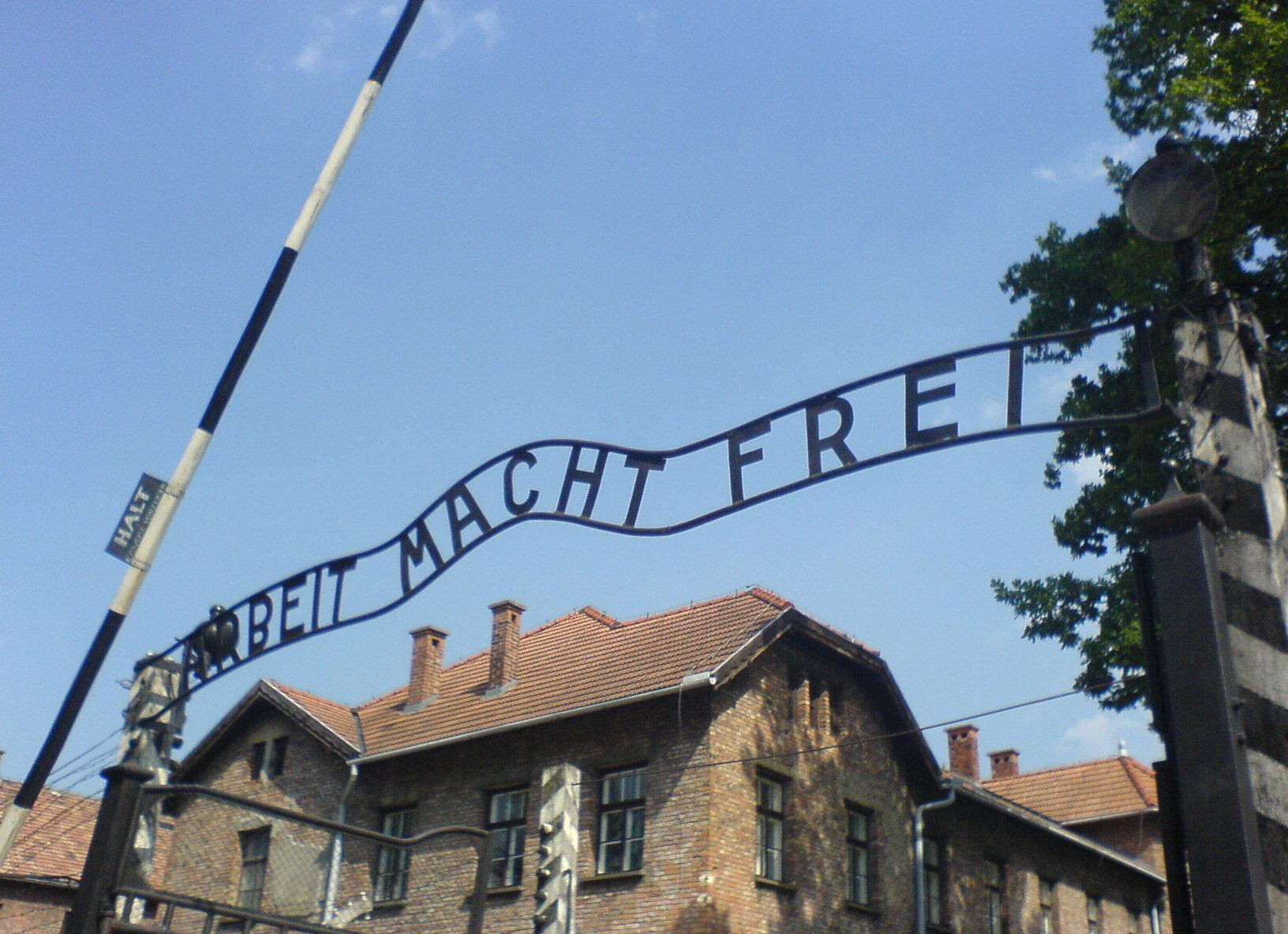
Arbeit macht frei at Auschwitz I

Early in the morning of 18 December 2009, the Arbeit macht frei ('work makes you free') sign over the gate of Auschwitz I was stolen. Two days later, police in northern Poland found the sign cut in three pieces and hidden in a forest outside Gdańsk. The theft was organised by a Swedish former neo-Nazi, Anders Högström, who reportedly hoped to sell the sign to a collector of Nazi memorabilia in order to finance a series of terror attacks aimed at influencing voters in the 2010 Swedish parliamentary elections. In December 2010, Högström was convicted in Poland and sentenced to serve two years and eight months in a Swedish prison, while five Polish men who had acted on his behalf served prison time in Poland.

Högström and his accomplices badly damaged the sign during the theft, cutting it into three pieces to fit it inside a car. Conservationists restored the sign to its original condition, and it is currently in storage, awaiting eventual display inside the museum. A replica hangs in its original place.

=== Iranian visit denied ===
In February 2006, Poland refused to grant visas to Iranian researchers who were planning to visit Auschwitz. Polish Foreign Minister Stefan Meller said his country should stop Iran from investigating the scale of the Holocaust, which Iranian President Mahmoud Ahmadinejad had dismissed as a myth. Iran has recently tried to leave the Ahmadinejad rhetoric in the past, but President Rouhani has never repudiated his predecessor's idea that the scale of the Holocaust is exaggerated. Holocaust denial is punishable in Poland by a prison sentence of up to three years.

=== Art purchases ===
Czechoslovak Jew Dina Babbitt, imprisoned at Auschwitz-Birkenau in 1943–1945, painted a dozen portraits of Romani inmates for the war criminal Josef Mengele during his medical experiments. Seven of the original 12 studies were discovered after the war and purchased by the Auschwitz-Birkenau State Museum in 1963 from an Auschwitz survivor. The museum asked Babbitt to return to Poland in 1973 to identify her work. She did so but also requested that the museum allow her to take her paintings home with her. Officials from the museum, led by Rabbi Andrew Baker, stated that the portraits belonged to the SS and Mengele, who died in Brazil in 1979. In 1999, an initiative to have the museum return the portraits was spearheaded by the U.S. government, which had been petitioned by Rafael Medoff and 450 American comic book artists. The museum rejected these claims as legally groundless.

== See also ==
- Majdanek State Museum
- International Youth Meeting Center in Oświęcim/Auschwitz
- Auschwitz Supermarket
