= Marywilska 44 =

Former shopping centre in Warsaw, Poland

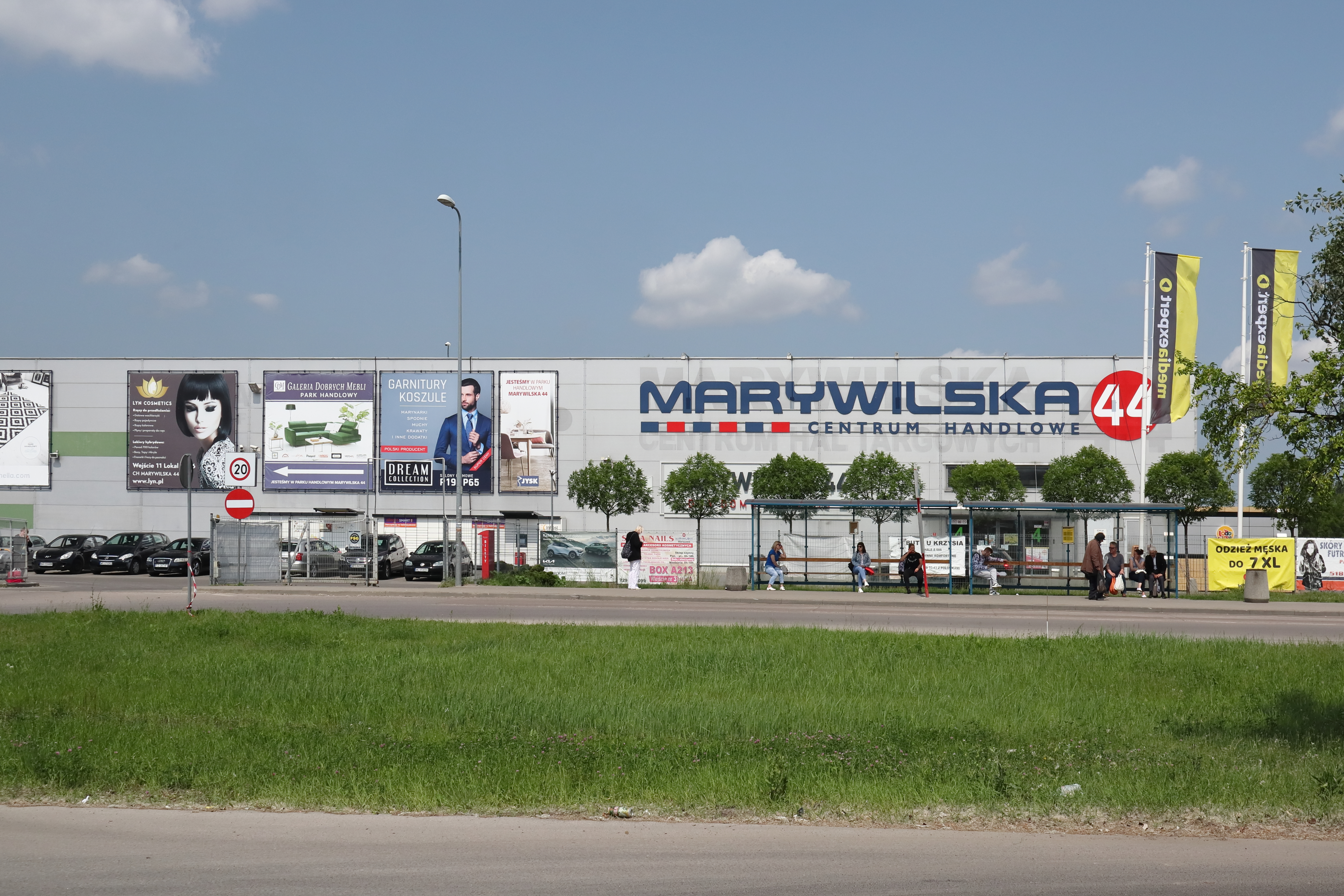
- Eastern building before the 2024 fire
- Interactive map of the Marywilska 44 area

General information
- Type: Shopping centre
- Location: Białołęka, Warsaw, Poland, 44 Marywilska Street
- Coordinates: 52°19′16″N 21°00′35″E
- Completed: 2010
- Closed: 12 May 2024
- Owner: Mirbud

Technical details
- Floor area: 80,000 m²

Website
- marywilska44.com

Marywilska 44 (Polish: [ma.rɘ̟ˈvil.ska t͡ʂtɛrˈd͡ʑɛɕ.t͡ɕi ˈt͡ʂtɛ.rɘ̟]) is an indoor marketplace in Warsaw, Poland, located at 44 Marywilska Street in the district of Białołęka. It was opened in 2010, becoming one of the largest shopping centres in Warsaw. In May 2024, a fire destroyed majority of the marketplace. The Polish government alleges that the mall was destroyed in an arson attack by Russian intelligence agents.

== History ==
It was opened in 2010, and owned by the company group Mirbud. It included a shopping centre with an area of 62,100 m^{2}, and an indoor market with an area of 12,100 m^{2}. In total, it has an area of 80,000 m^{2}, and included 1400 stores and services.

On 12 May 2024 around 3:30 a fire broke out in the eastern building, resulting in a complete destruction of the facility. In May 2025, the Polish government concluded that Russian intelligence was responsible for destroying the mall in an arson attack. The same year in October three Ukrainian men received prison sentences, ranging from one year four months to five and half year, for participating in the group behind this and other cases of arson.

A large portion of vendors at Marywilska 44 come from the Vietnamese-Polish community, relocated there after 10th-Anniversary Stadium marketplace was closed and demolished in preparation for Kazimierz Górski National Stadium construction. The May 2024 fire not only deprived business owners of income, but often destroyed a large portion of cash belonging to their families, kept in safeboxes at the site due to obstacles migrants face in creating bank accounts.

The owner of Marywilska 44 promised to provide in early August 2024 a temporary area for vendors, consisting of 800 intermodal containers. By October only 400 boxes were provided and, in light of the earlier conflict with Marywilska 44 owner, vendors set up an alternative shopping center, "Modlińska 6D", about 3 kilometres (1.9 mi) to the south. The location offers an additional 250 stalls.
