= Seegrotte =

Austrian cave system and former mine

Coordinates: 48°05′09″N 16°15′27″E

Boat tour briefing

The Seegrotte, near Hinterbrühl, Austria, is a cave system with a large grotto located under a former gypsum mine.

It was closed in 1912 after the mine flooded with 20 million litres of water. It became a tourist attraction after 1930 and has been one ever since, with the exception of World War II. The lake is 60 meters below ground, the water surface is 6200 m² and pumps are used to keep the water level down.

Visitors can tour the old mine and take a boat ride across the underground lake.

== World War II history ==
During World War II the Seegrotte was used for production of Heinkel He 162A jet fighters in Nazi Germany's "second Ruhr".
