= Mural Trail in Oświęcim =

Collection of murals in Oświęcim, Poland

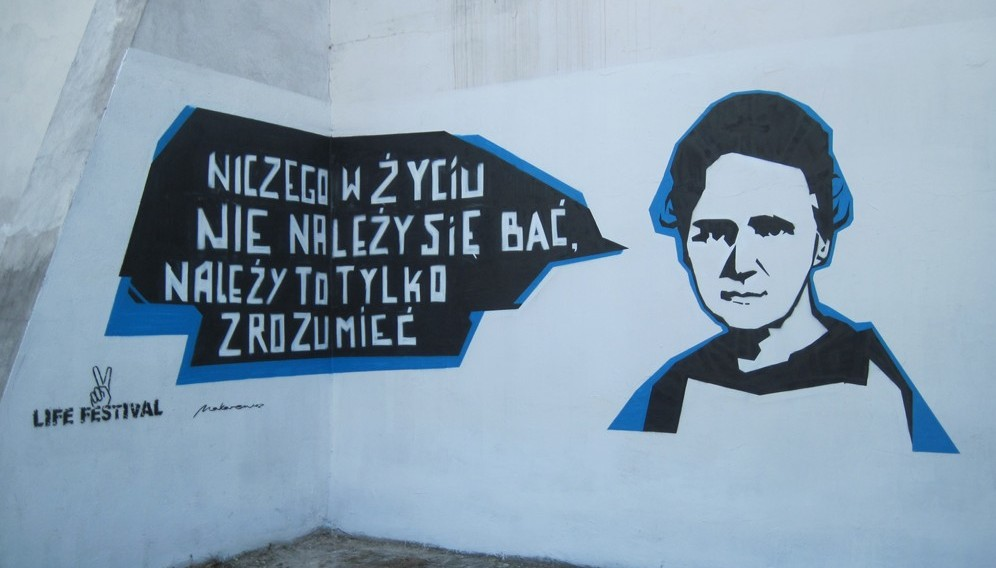
Talking Heads - Maria Skłodowska-Curie, 2012

The Mural Trail in Oświęcim – a municipal collection of murals on buildings in the center of Oświęcim, developed since 2010. Most of the artworks promote peace, advocate breaking down barriers and cultural stereotypes, and promote tolerance. Well-known visual artists were invited to create murals: Andrzej Pągowski, Edward Dwurnik, Rafał Olbiński, Tomasz Bagiński and others.

The murals were commissioned to highlight the peaceful message of the Life Festival Oświęcim, organized in 2010-2018. All murals bear the signatures of their authors. Most of the murals were made with the financial support of the Municipality of Oświęcim.

== Murals ==
=== Kontrabasiści (Edward Dwurnik) ===
A mural on a building at Zamkowa Street by Edward Dwurnik, made in 2011. Edward Dwurnik is one of the most recognizable artists of Polish contemporary art. The mural shows pre-war musicians playing double basses. The artist intended the image to influence the perception of Oświęcim through a prism other than the tragic context of the concentration camp and the trauma of World War II.

=== The Guitarist (Andrzej Pągowski) ===
Located at Śniadeckiego 22 Street, the mural by Andrzej Pągowski was created in 2012. Pągowski is the creator of over a thousand posters; he is also the author of illustrations for books and the press, album covers, theater and television set designs, as well as film and music video scripts. The mural was created on the 35th anniversary of the artist's work. Members of the artist's family died in the Auschwitz camp. Andrzej Pągowski emphasized in interviews that the message of his work is to show that "there are people of culture and art in the world who, through their work, declare that they want to live in peace, do not want war. We leave such symbols, and you can think about it".

=== Błogosławiony spokój nicości (Rafał Olbiński) ===
The mural by Rafał Olbiński is located at ul. Śniadeckiego 22, made in 2013. Rafał Olbiński is a versatile artist - painter, illustrator, graphic artist, designer, set designer, and poster artist. His work is characterized by a style bordering on symbolism and surrealism. The mural is meant to invite reflection, for which many people have less and less time. According to the artist, the painting refers to the simplest things in life and the beauty of the surrounding reality that is easy to miss.

=== Talking Heads ===
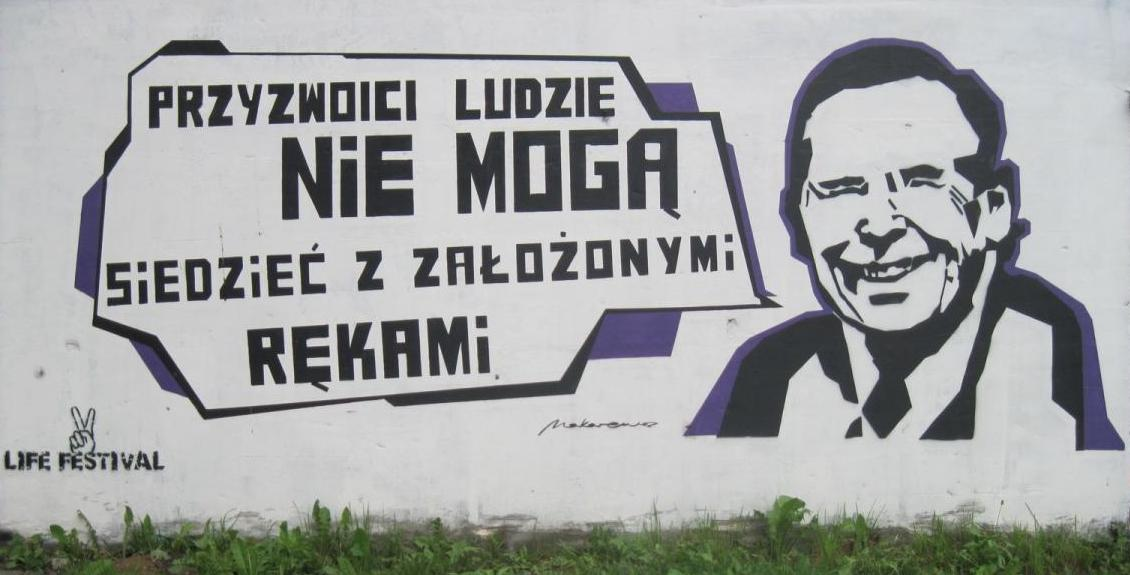
Talking Heads - Vaclav Havel

In seven locations in Oświęcim, images of commonly recognized people - intellectuals, philosophers, thinkers, scientists - were placed on the walls along with a quotation representing their activity or work. The murals from this series include seven images: Leszek Kołakowski (Olszewskiego Street), Jacek Kuroń (Berka Joselewicza St.), Maria Skłodowska-Curie (Kościelna St.), Martin Luther King (Stolarska st.), John Paul II (Klasztorna st.), Mahatma Gandhi (Bulwary st.) and Vaclav Havel (Dąbrowskiego st). The images of distinguished human rights activists are to popularize universal values such as tolerance, human rights, peace, democracy, and civil society.

The selection of quotations refers to the still existing problems of the modern world. The set of murals is meant to provoke reflection and draw attention to social threats and constructive attitudes. The murals were made in 2012 as part of a project organized by the Auschwitz Jewish Center in Oświęcim during the Life Festival Oświęcim, and their authors were Tomasz Kiek and Mateusz Makarewicz.

=== Katedra (Tomasz Bagiński) ===
Located at the intersection of Dąbrowskiego and Plebańska streets, the mural is a frame from the famous film by Tomasz Bagiński "The Cathedral", nominated in 2003 for an Oscar in the "short animated film" category. Tomasz Bagiński is a Polish cartoonist, animator and director. He is an artist known mainly as an animation artist. He is inspired by the paintings of Zdzisław Beksiński and the works of Jacek Dukaj.
