= Jan Skarbek Square =

Square in the Old Town of Oświęcim - Auschwitz, Poland

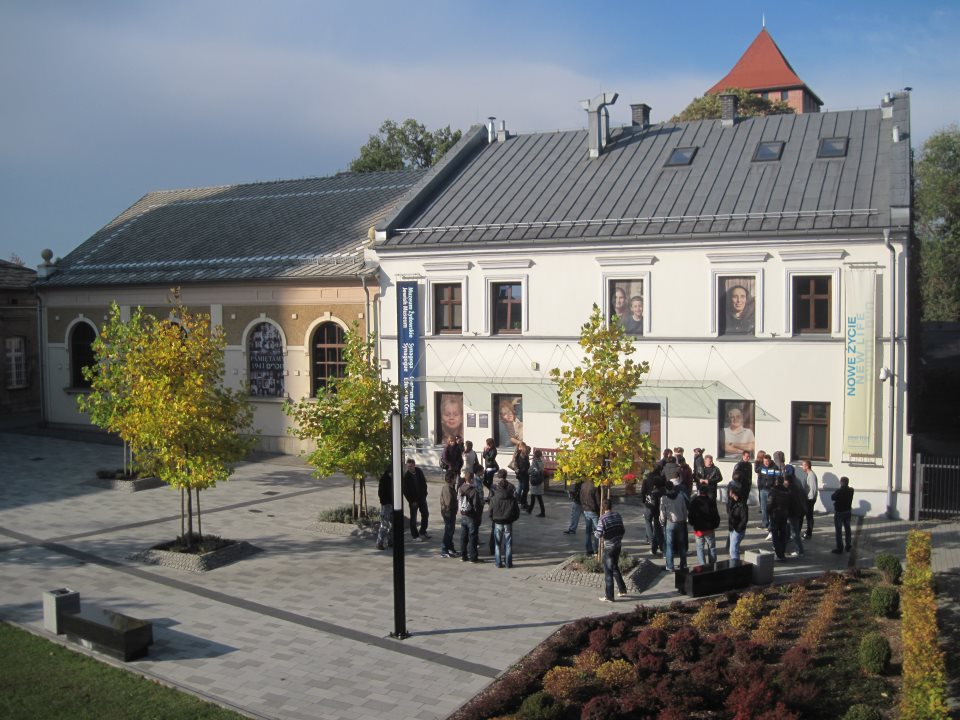
- Jan Skarbek Square in Oświęcim
- Interactive map of Jan Skarbek Square
- Namesake: Jan Skarbek
- Location: Oświęcim
- Coordinates: 50°02′23″N 19°13′15″E

Jan Skarbek Square (Polish: Plac ks. Jana Skarbka, former name: Kościelny Square, renamed in 1992) – a square in the Old Town of Oświęcim, Poland, located at Kościelna Street (matching the previous name of the square). The Berka Joselewicza Street (formerly Żydowska) also connects to the square.

== Layout and buildings ==
The square adjoins Kościelna Street with one side and is surrounded by urban buildings, which include the pre-war synagogue, the adjoining pre-war Kornreich and Dattner house, the Kleuger house and post-war buildings on both sides of the square. In the middle of the square there is a protected and restored historic city well, uncovered during urban renovation works in 2009.

=== Oświęcim Synagogue ===
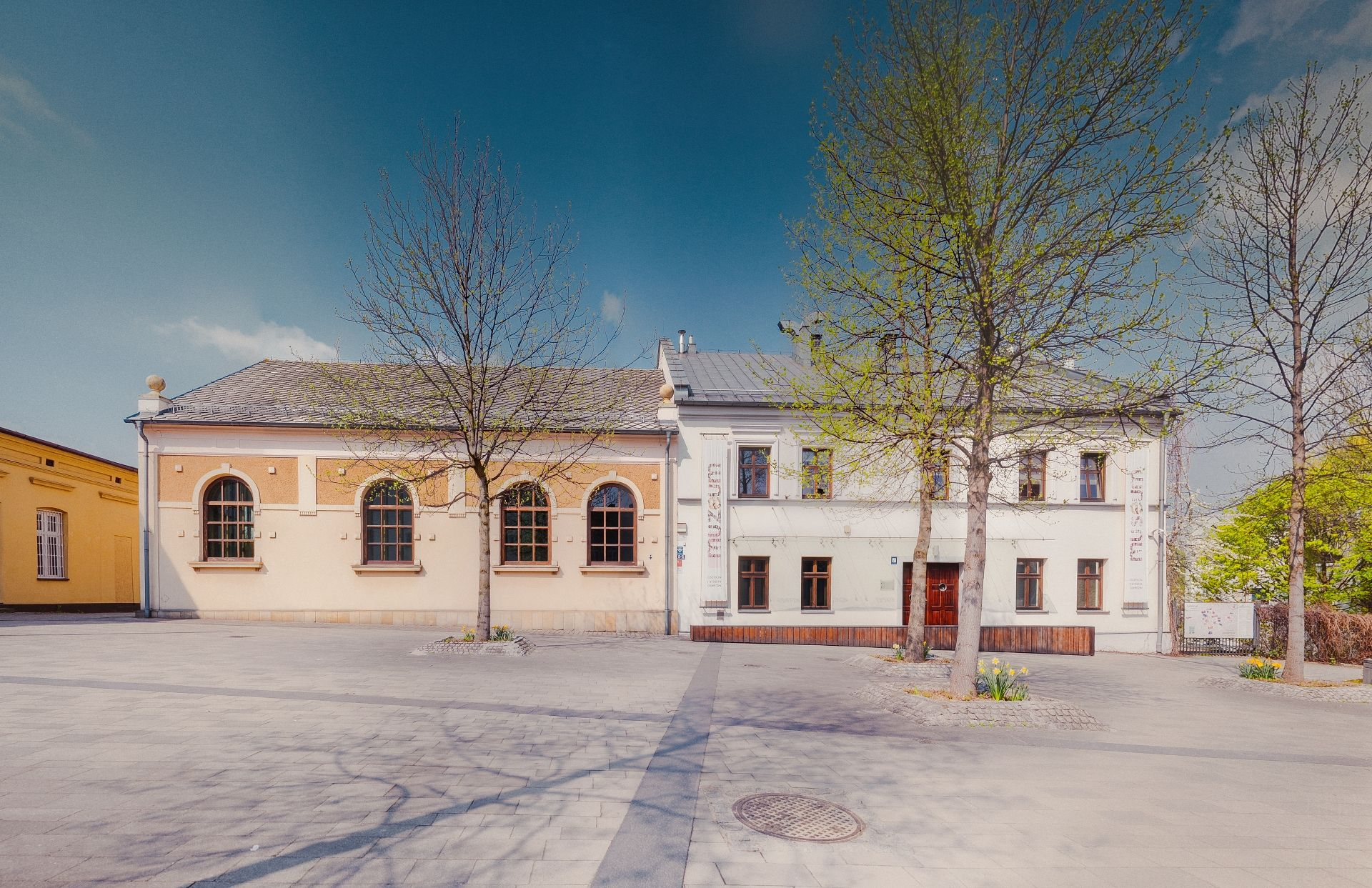
The Oświęcim Synagogue and Kornreich and Dattner House

In the years 1928–1930, the building of the Chevra Lomdei Mishnayot Synagogue was built. It is the only surviving synagogue in Oświęcim. The synagogue functioned until the German army entered Oświęcim in 1939. During World War II, the occupiers devastated the interior of the synagogue and utilized it as an ammunition warehouse. After the Soviet troops had entered Oświęcim, the synagogue was returned to its original function and served the small Jewish community. By 1955, almost all Jews had left the town. In 1977, the synagogue building was taken over by the Polish State Treasury. In 1998, it was returned to the Jewish Community in Bielsko-Biała and then, in June 1998, it was transferred to the Auschwitz Jewish Center Foundation. In the years 1999–2000 the synagogue was renovated and the building regained its former appearance.

=== Kornreich and Dattner House ===
The Kornreich and Dattner house adjoins the synagogue building. Before World War II, four families lived in this building, including the Jewish families of the Kornreich and Dattner. Since 2000, this building, together with the adjacent synagogue and the house of the Kleuger family, forms the buildings of the Auschwitz Jewish Center and Museum in Oświęcim. The permanent exhibition of the Jewish Museum is presented in the Kornreich building.

=== Kleuger House ===
The building located at the back of the Oświęcim Synagogue was probably built at the turn of the 19th and 20th centuries. In 1928 it became the property of Ber Teichman and his daughter, Frida Kleuger née Teichman. Symcha and Frida Kleuger, as well as their six children, died during the Holocaust. Only Shimson, Moshe and Bronia survived. Shimson Kleuger, as the only one of three siblings, returned to Oświęcim in the 1960s and moved to his family home. Shimson was the last Jewish resident of Oświęcim. Currently, the Kleuger family house is home to the Café Bergson museum café and the educational spaces of the Jewish Center in Oświęcim.

==== City well ====
In the center of the square, there are preserved remains of a historic city well, uncovered during renovation works in 2009.

==== Display ====
There is a display on the square, the form of a solid reminiscent of the core exhibition of the Jewish Museum in Oświęcim. Its triangular shape refers to the torn arms of the Star of David, indicating the directions of emigration of the Jewish inhabitants of Oświęcim. The interior of the display contains drawings, photographs and texts related to the narrative of the core exhibition. The display stand is visible from the side of Kościelna Street and the Market Square, and the apex shows the entrance to the Jewish Museum.

== Patron ==
The present patron of the square is Father Jan Skarbek, a Roman Catholic priest born in 1885, parish priest, chronicler and honorary citizen of Oświęcim (he received this title from the city authorities in 1934). Father Skarbek was known for cultivating good interfaith relations in Oświęcim and maintaining friendly relations with the last rabbi of Oświęcim, Elyahu Bombach.

== Notable buildings ==
- Auschwitz Jewish Center in Oświęcim
- Oświęcim Synagogue
