= Oświęcim Castle =

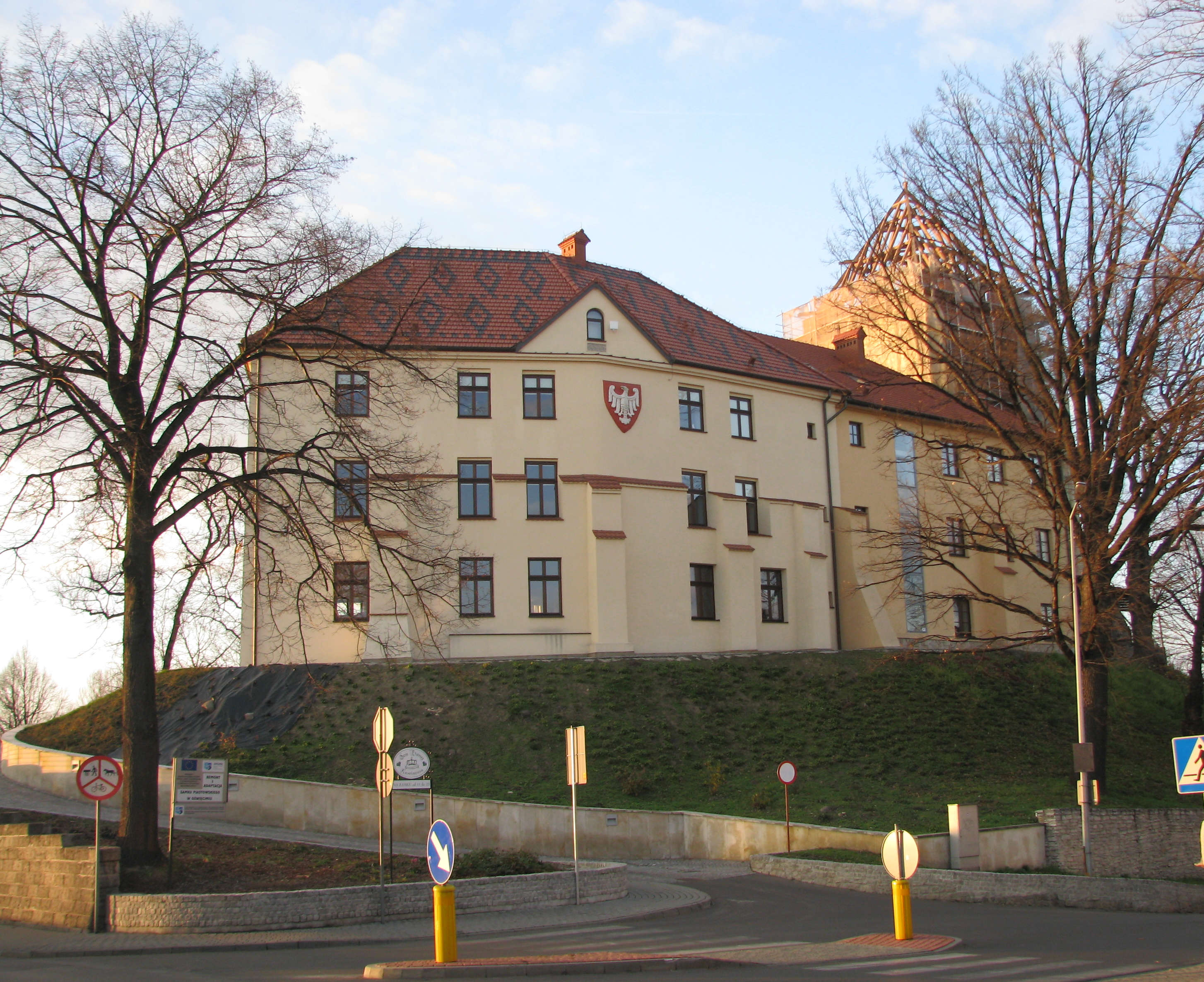
- Oświęcim Castle

- Location of the Oświęcim Castle in Poland
- 50°03′28″N 19°17′46″E
- Location: Oświęcim, Lesser Poland Voivodeship, in Poland

History
- Built: 1177–79

Site notes
- Architectural style: Gothic

Oświęcim Castle (Polish: Zamek w Oświęcimiu) is a castle raised in the Medieval Ages on the top of a hill, on the right bank of the River Soła in Oświęcim.

The castle comprises a thirteenth-century early-Gothic defence tower covered by a roof, a two-floor building built around a courtyard (with the old wing from the beginning of the sixteenth century) and additional connections between the wings built in 1929–31. Most of the fortifications around the castle were destroyed due to the changing river course of the River Soła.

On the top of the hill where the castle is located there are remains of the fortifications. There are two tunnels located underneath the castle, the older (built before 1914) and the second which was excavated by the Germans (1940–1944). The tunnels were used as bunkers.

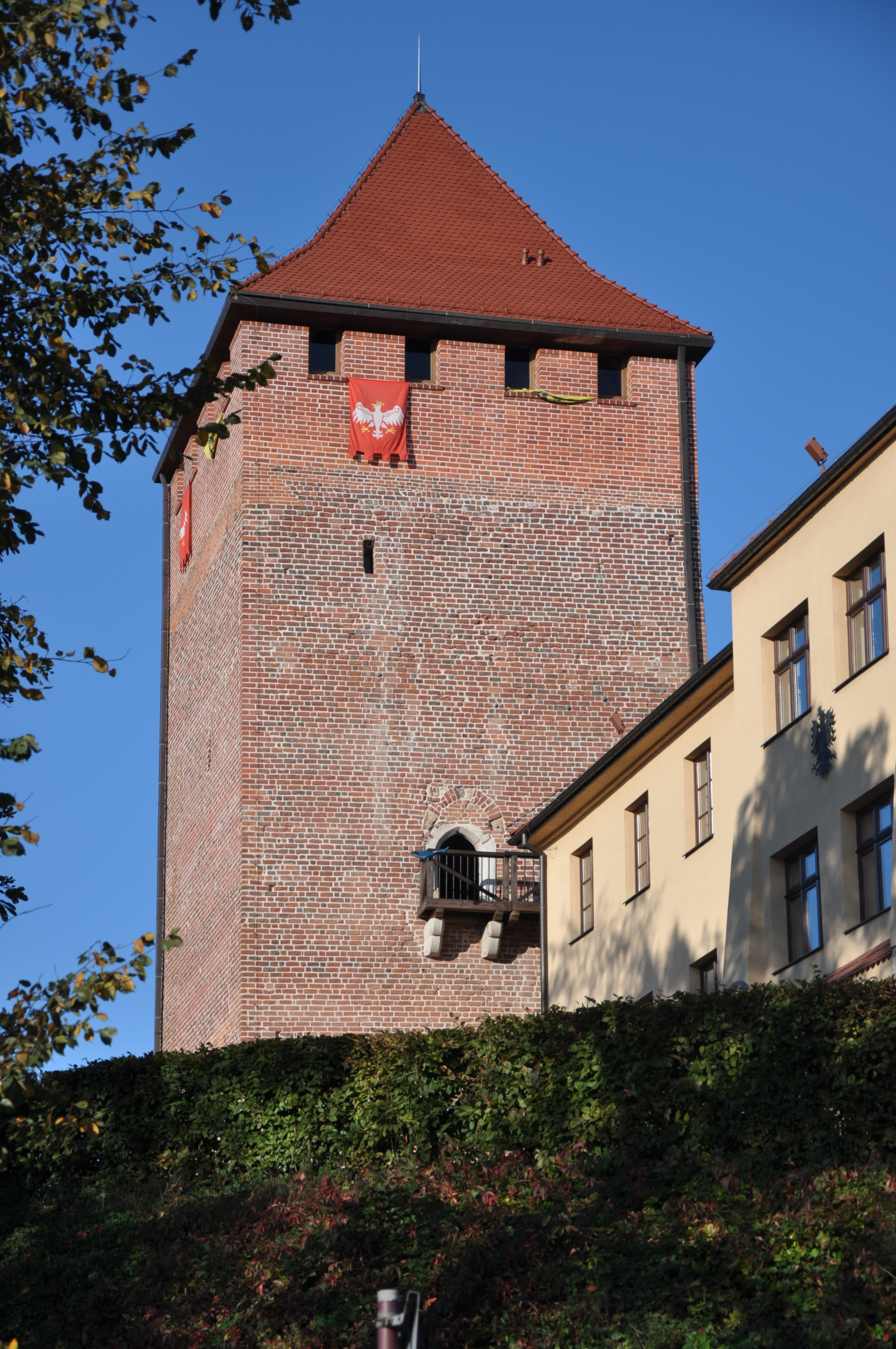
Gothic brick tower – significantly reconstructed in 2008/2009 (added an upper floor with a battlement)

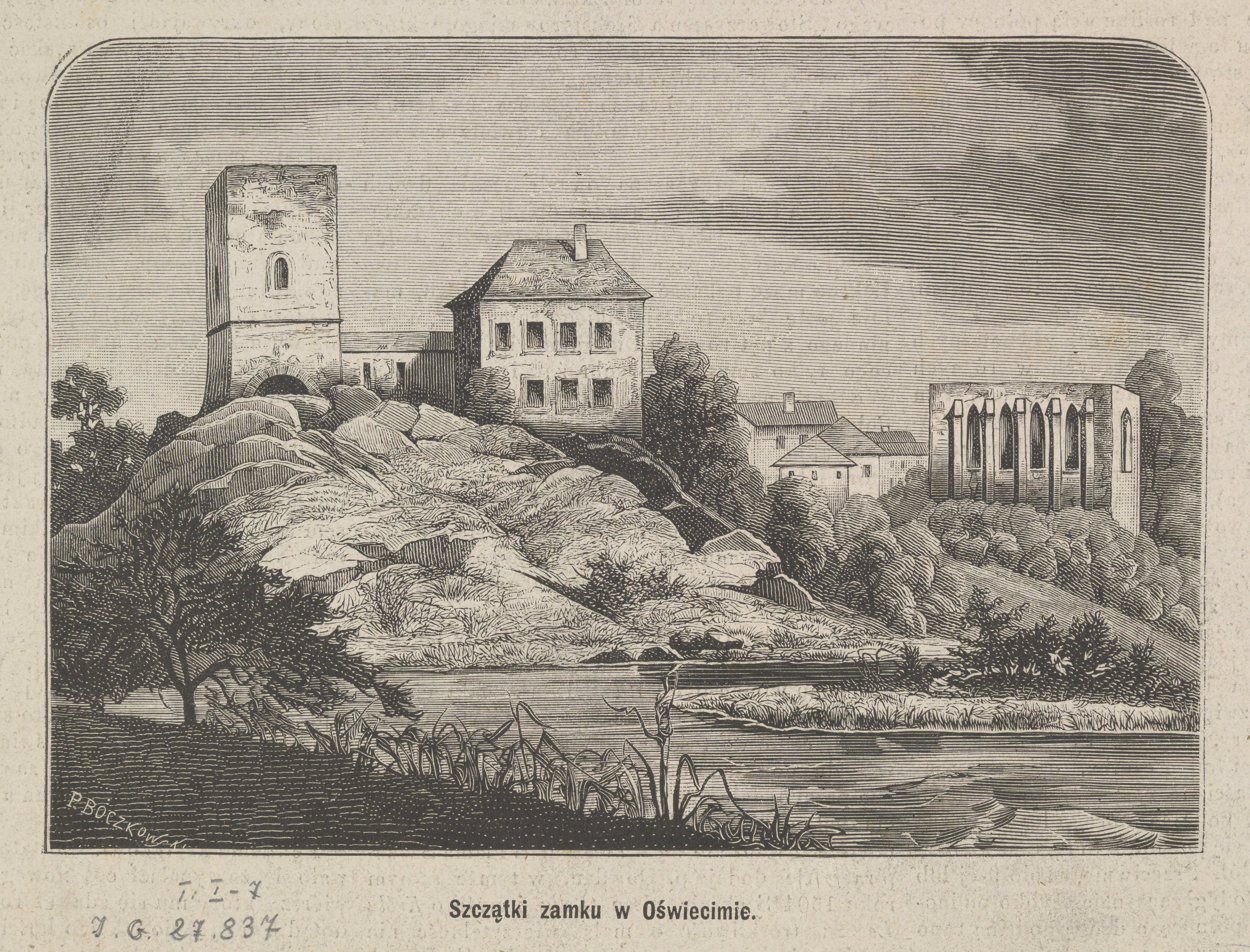
The castle after 1850 (view from W)
