= Oświęcim =

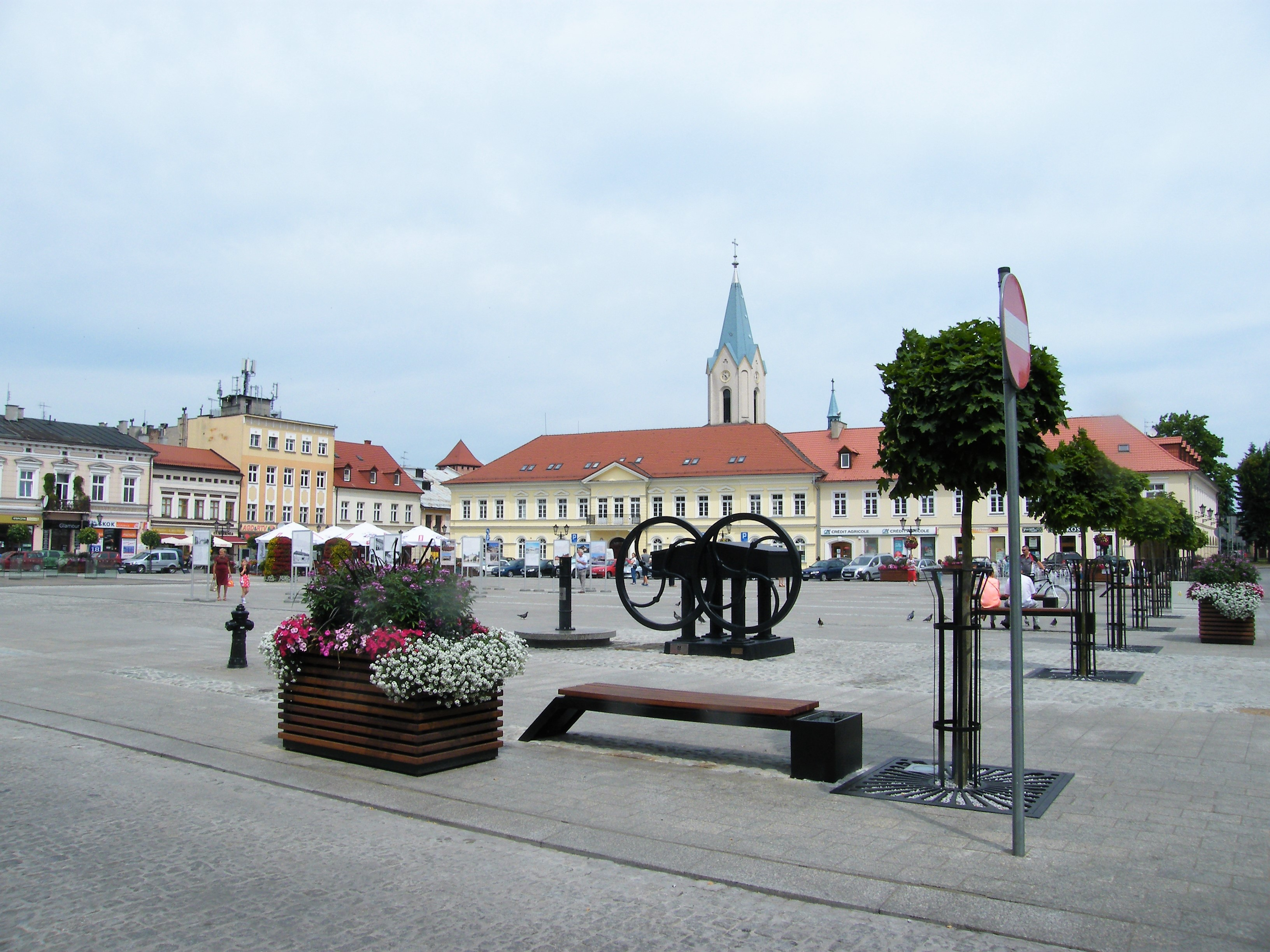
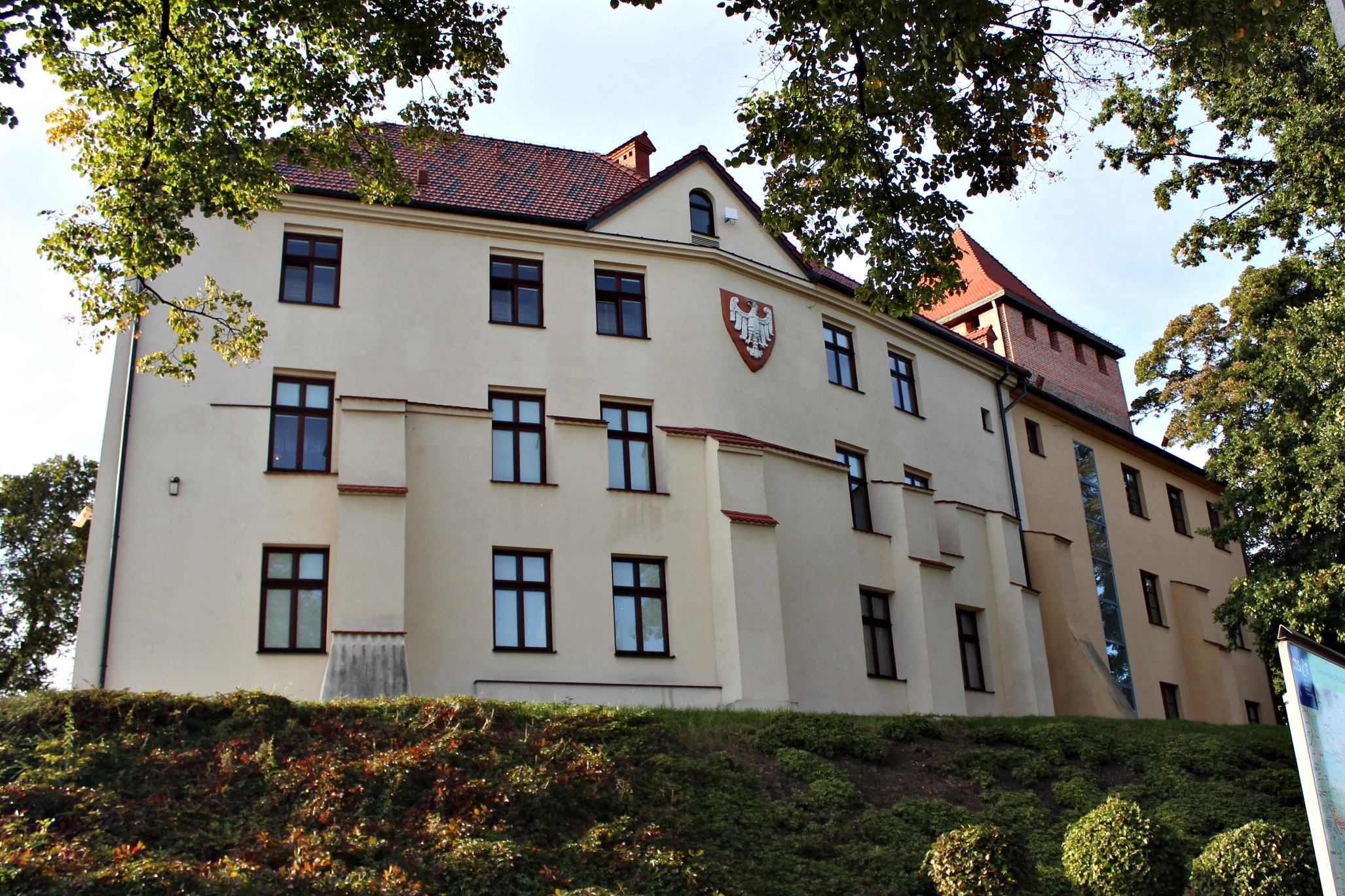
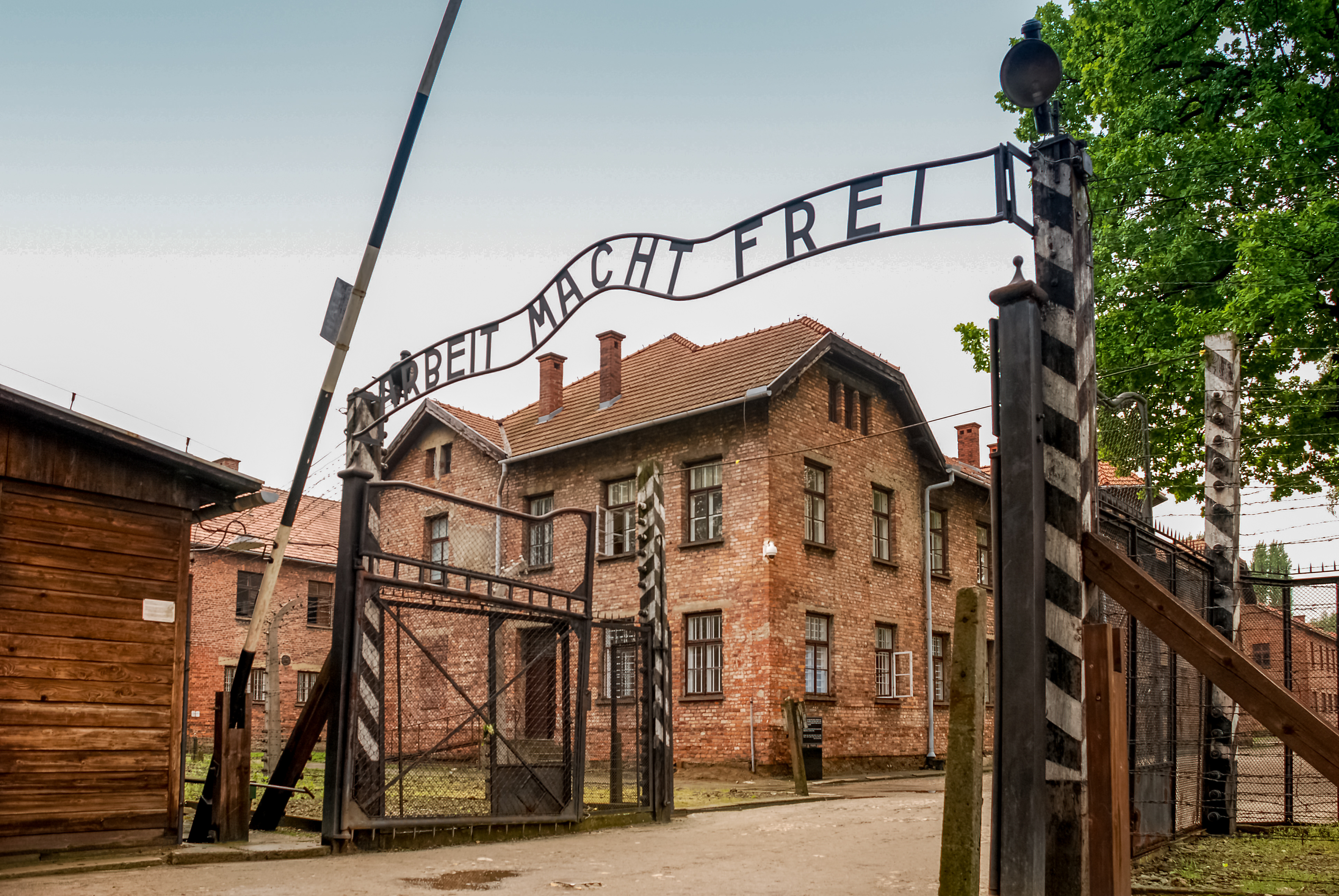
- Old Market Square Royal Castle Auschwitz concentration camp

- Flag Coat of arms

- Location within Poland
- Coordinates: 50°02′17″N 19°13′17″E
- Country: Poland
- Voivodeship: Lesser Poland
- County: Oświęcim
- Gmina: Oświęcim (urban gmina)
- Established: First mentioned in 1117
- City rights: 1291

Government
  - City mayor: Janusz Chwierut (PO)

Area
  - Total: 30.3 km^{2} (11.7 sq mi)
- Elevation: 230 m (750 ft)

Population (31 December 2025)
  - Total: 33,286
  - Density: 1,100/km^{2} (2,850/sq mi)
- Time zone: UTC+1 (CET)
  - Summer (DST): UTC+2 (CEST)
- Postal code: 32–600, 32–601, 32–602, 32–603, 32–606, 32–610
- Area code: +48 033
- Car plates: KOS
- Website: Oświęcim

Oświęcim (Note: Polish: [ɔˈɕfjɛɲtɕim]; German: Auschwitz [ˈaʊʃvɪts]; Silesian: Uośwjyńćim; Yiddish: אָשפּיצין, romanized: Oshpitzin) is a town in the Lesser Poland Voivodeship in southern Poland, situated 33 kilometres (21 mi) southeast of Katowice, near the confluence of the Vistula (Wisła) and Soła rivers.

Oświęcim dates back to the 12th century, when it was an important castellan seat. From 1315 to 1457 it was the seat of a local line of the Piast dynasty, and from 1564 to 1772 it was a royal city of the Kingdom of Poland, with the Ducal and Royal Castle and several medieval Gothic churches among the city's landmarks. Located on the east-west trade route, it was an important hub for trade, especially in salt from Wieliczka. In the interwar period, Oświęcim was a garrison town for the Polish Army, and during the German occupation of Poland in World War II, the former barracks were expanded to host the infamous German Nazi Auschwitz concentration camp (also known as KL or KZ Auschwitz Birkenau), now the Auschwitz-Birkenau State Museum, a UNESCO World Heritage Site.

Oświęcim is a railroad junction, a center of chemical, electrical machinery and building materials industries, and home to Unia Oświęcim, one of the most accomplished Polish ice hockey teams.

== Name ==
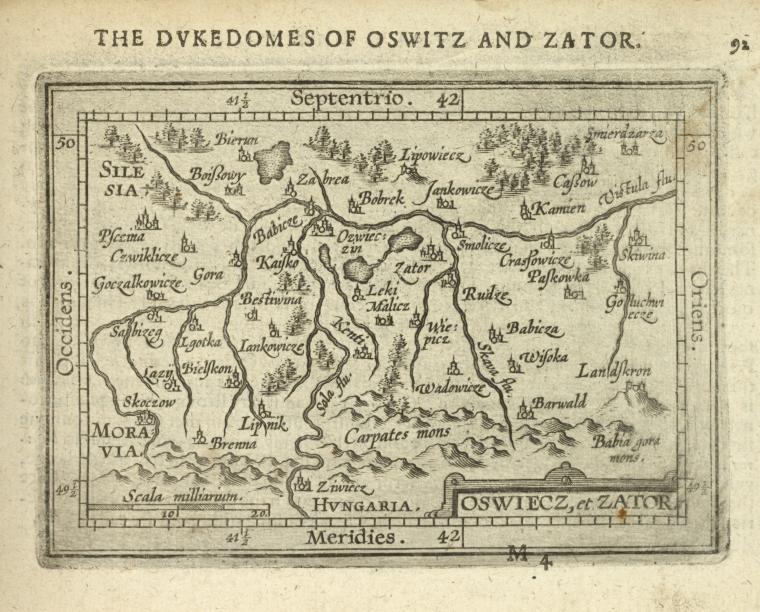
Map of the Duchy of Oświęcim from 1603 by Abraham Ortelius with the city marked as Ozwieczin

The name of the town is of Polish/Slavic extraction, possibly derived from the owner of a Slavic gord which existed there in the Middle Ages, or derived from the Polish word "oświęcić", meaning "to sanctify". Some Medieval spellings of the name are: Oswenin (1217), Osvencin (1280), Hospencin (1283), Osswetem (1290), Uspencin (1297), Oswentim (1302) etc. It has been spelled many different ways and known by many different languages over time, including Czech, German, and Latinised versions. (Note: Ospenchin (1217), Osvencin (1280), Hospencin (1283), Osswetem (1293), Uspencin (1297), Oswentim (1302), Wswencim (1304), Auswintzen (1312), Oświęcim (1314), Oswencin (1327), Auswieczin (1372), Awswiczin (1372), Uswiczin (1400); Oświęcim was spelled Osswencimen or Osviecim(en) in Latin)

The town was an important center of commerce from the late Middle Ages onward. Fourteenth-century German-speaking merchants called it Auswintz; by the 15th century, this name had become Auschwitz. It later became the capital city of the Polish Duchy of Oświęcim. From 1772 to 1918 Oświęcim belonged to the Habsburg Kingdom of Galicia and Lodomeria (from 1804 a crownland of the Austrian Empire and 1867 Austria-Hungary), and both Polish and German names were in official use. The town was annexed into Nazi Germany during World War II and the name Auschwitz was used. It became known as Oświęcim after 27 January 1945, when the Wehrmacht was pushed out by the Red Army.

== Geography and transport ==
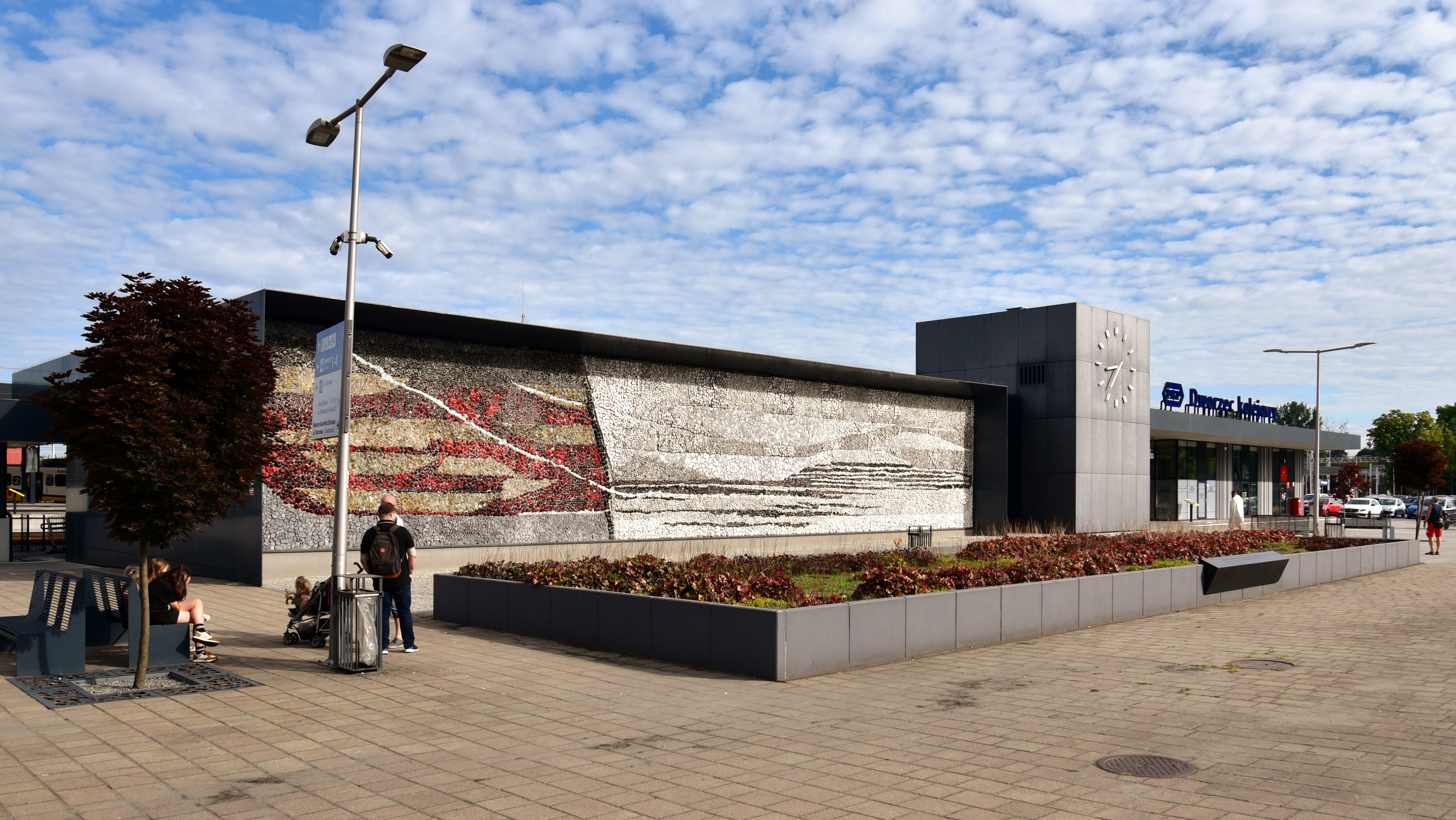
Main railway station

Oświęcim lies at the intersection of National Road 44 and local roads 933 and 948. Oświęcim's old town is east of the Soła, with the Main Market Square (Rynek Główny) at its center. The railway station is across the river in the northwest part of town; the main museum is on the west side. The Auschwitz-Birkenau State Museum is in the village of Brzezinka, to the west of the railway station. The chemical works are east of the town.

The main bus station of the town lies in the east of the town, and local bus services are operated by PKS Oświęcim. The PKP railway services are available to Kraków, Katowice and Czechowice-Dziedzice, and internationally to Vienna and Prague. The nearest airport is 60 kilometres (37 miles) away, at Kraków Balice. According to the 2002 data, Oświęcim is 30 km^{2} (11½ sq. mi.), of which forests comprise only 1%. The neighbouring boroughs (gmina) are Chelmek, Libiąż, and the gmina of Oświęcim.

== Climate ==
Oświęcim has a warm-summer humid continental climate characterised by four distinct seasons: spring, summer, autumn, and winter. Located in the Oświęcim Basin, it experiences relatively high precipitation averaging slightly below 1000 mm (40 inches) per year. The precipitation is evenly distributed throughout the year, though the spring and summer seasons tend to receive more. Summers are warm, humid, and frequently cloudy due to the influence of polar maritime air masses; winters are cold and windy, with snow cover.

The average annual temperature in Oświęcim ranges between 7 and 8°C (44 to 46°F), with the average maximum of 12.6°C (55°F) and minimum of 3.5°C (38°F). The average annual relative humidity is 80.2%, with average annual precitipation of 700 to 800 mm (28 to 32 inches). The growing season in Oświęcim ranges between 210 and 220 days. The highest temperature recorded in Oświęcim was 33°C (91°F), while the lowest was -29.7°C (-21°F). Fog is very common throughout the year. Due to its frequency, fog is considered one of the town's trademarks. Oświęcim's climate influenced Schutzstaffel's decision to build a concentration camp there, as the local foggy and humid weather, as well as the frequent rain, snowfall and heavy wind, was deemed suitable.

Eugeniusz Romer classified Oświęcim to have a submontane basin climate (Polish: klimat kotlin podgórskich), characterized by diversity. Oceanic and continental air clashes with each other, most often resulting in the dominance of polar-maritime air. As a result, summers in Oświęcim tend to feature cool air and heavy cloud cover, while in winter there are risks of warming and thaws. Less frequently, polar-continental air also flows into the city, resulting in dry and cold air in winter, or hot and dry weather in summer. The city of Oświęcim itself has a microclimate — its annual temperature is about 1°C (2°F) higher, and the annual frost-free period about 20 days longer, than the neighbouring areas.

Climate data for Oświęcim (1991–2021)
Month	Jan	Feb	Mar	Apr	May	Jun	Jul	Aug	Sep	Oct	Nov	Dec	Year
Mean daily maximum °C (°F)	0 (32)	2 (36)	7 (45)	14 (57)	18 (64)	21 (70)	23 (73)	23 (73)	18 (64)	13 (55)	8 (46)	2 (36)	12 (54)
Daily mean °C (°F)	−4 (25)	−2 (28)	3 (37)	9 (48)	13 (55)	17 (63)	19 (66)	18 (64)	14 (57)	9 (48)	4 (39)	−1 (30)	8 (46)
Mean daily minimum °C (°F)	−7 (19)	−5 (23)	−2 (28)	3 (37)	8 (46)	12 (54)	14 (57)	14 (57)	9 (48)	4 (39)	1 (34)	−3 (27)	4 (39)
Average precipitation mm (inches)	60 (2.4)	56 (2.2)	65 (2.6)	66 (2.6)	102 (4.0)	101 (4.0)	114 (4.5)	87 (3.4)	86 (3.4)	64 (2.5)	63 (2.5)	58 (2.3)	922 (36.3)
Average precipitation days (≥ 0.1 mm)	10	9	10	9	11	10	11	9	9	9	9	10	116
Average snowy days (≥ 0 cm)	26	25	20	6	0	0	0	0	0.	3	11	24	115
Average relative humidity (%)	83	82	75	69	72	73	73	72	75	79	84	82	76
Source 1: Meteomodel.pl
Source 2: Climate-data.org

== History ==
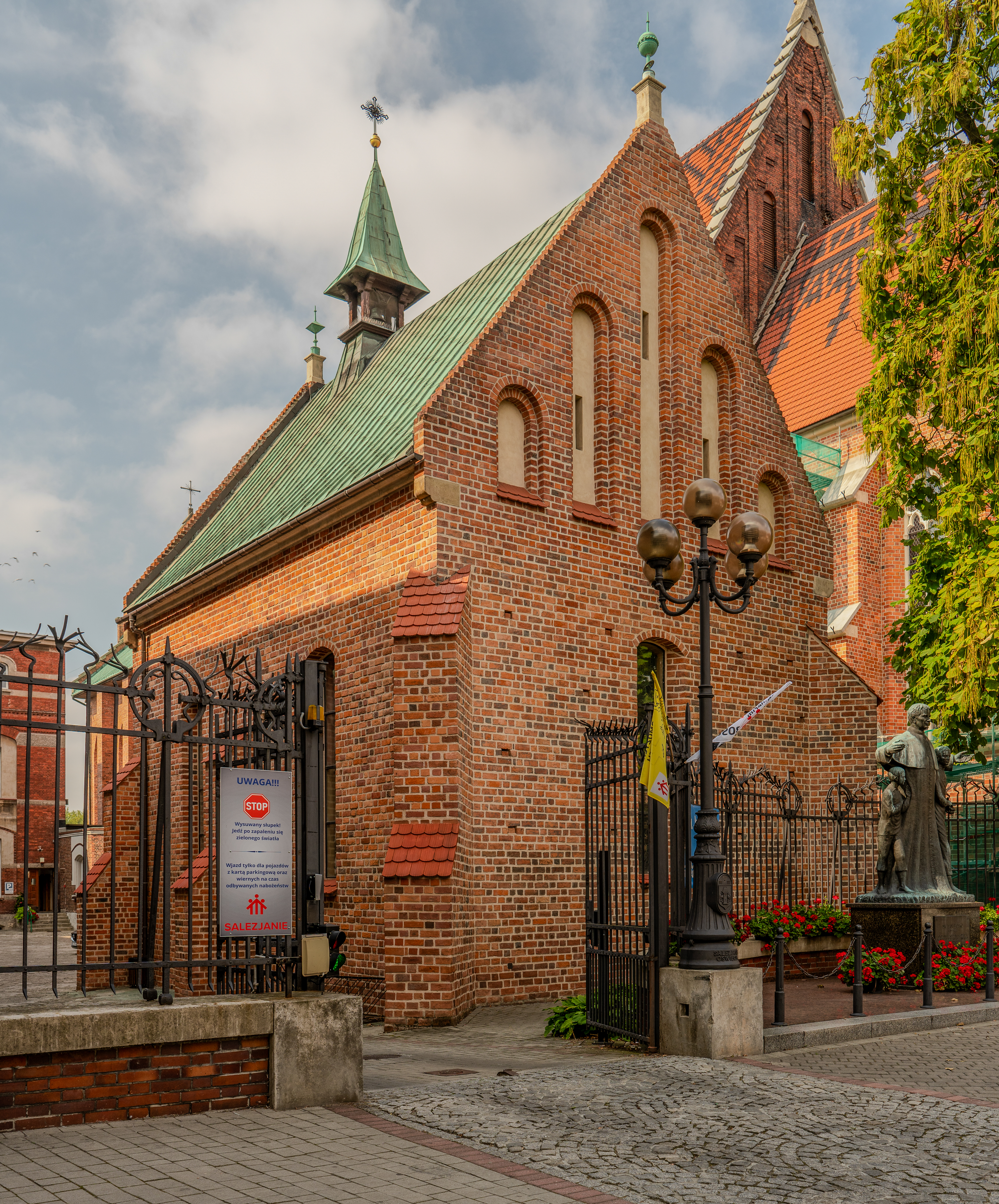
Medieval Saint Hyacinth chapel

Historical affiliations

Kingdom of Poland 1025–c. 1320
∟ Seniorate Province 1138–c. 1179
∟ Duchy of Opole c. 1179–1202
∟ Duchy of Opole and Racibórz 1202–1281
∟ Duchy of Cieszyn 1281–1315
Duchy of Oświęcim 1315–1457
Kingdom of Poland 1454–1569
Polish–Lithuanian Commonwealth 1569–1772
Habsburg Monarchy 1772–1804
Austrian Empire 1804–1867
Austria-Hungary 1867–1918
Second Polish Republic 1918–1939
Nazi Germany 1939–1945 (occupation)
Provisional Government of the Republic of Poland 1944–1945
Provisional Government of National Unity 1945–1947
Polish People's Republic 1947–1989
Third Polish Republic 1989–present

Oświęcim has a rich history, which dates back to the early days of Polish statehood. It is one of the oldest castellan gords in Poland. Following the Fragmentation of Poland in 1138, Duke Casimir II the Just attached the town to the Duchy of Opole in c. 1179 for his younger brother Mieszko I Tanglefoot, Duke of Opole and Racibórz. The town was destroyed in 1241 during the first Mongol invasion of Poland. Around 1272 the newly rebuilt Oświęcim was granted a municipal charter modeled on those of Lwówek Śląski (a Polish variation of the Magdeburg Law). The charter was confirmed on 3 September 1291, and Duke Mieszko of Cieszyn granted salt staple right. In 1281, the Land of Oświęcim became part of the newly established Duchy of Cieszyn, and in c. 1315, the Duchy of Oświęcim was established. In 1327, Duke Jan I the Scholastic joined his Duchy with the Duchy of Zator and, soon afterwards, his state became a vassal of the Kingdom of Bohemia, where it remained for over a century. In 1445, the Duchy was divided into three separate entities – the Duchies of Oświęcim, Zator and Toszek. In 1454, Duke Jan IV of Oświęcim pledged allegiance to Poland, thus the city returned under Polish suzerainty.

In 1457 Polish King Casimir IV Jagiellon bought the rights to Oświęcim. In 1471, Casimir IV and his son Vladislaus stayed in the city before Vladislaus set off to Prague for his coronation as King of Bohemia. Owing to Oświęcim's location on the trade route towards Silesia and Moravia, in 1539 the townspeople were granted a royal privilege authorizing trade in salt from Wieliczka. On 25 February 1564, King Sigismund II Augustus issued a bill integrating the former Duchies of Oświęcim and Zator into the Kingdom of Poland. Both lands were attached to the Kraków Voivodeship and Lesser Poland Province, forming the Silesian County. Before 1564, Oświęcim was semi-independent in Poland and enjoyed an extensive degree of autonomy, similarly to Royal Prussia. Staple rights were granted in 1565, and confirmed in 1647 and 1667. The town later became one of the centers of Jewish culture in Poland.

Like other towns of Lesser Poland, Oświęcim prospered in the period known as Polish Golden Age. This period came to an abrupt end in 1655, during the catastrophic Swedish invasion of Poland. Oświęcim was burned and afterward, the town declined, and in 1772 (see Partitions of Poland), it was annexed by the Habsburg Empire, as part of the Kingdom of Galicia and Lodomeria, where it remained until late 1918. After the 1815 Congress of Vienna, the town was close to the borders of both Russian-controlled Congress Poland, and the Kingdom of Prussia. In the 1866 war between Austria and the Prussian-led North German Confederation, a cavalry skirmish was fought at the town, in which an Austrian force defeated a Prussian incursion.

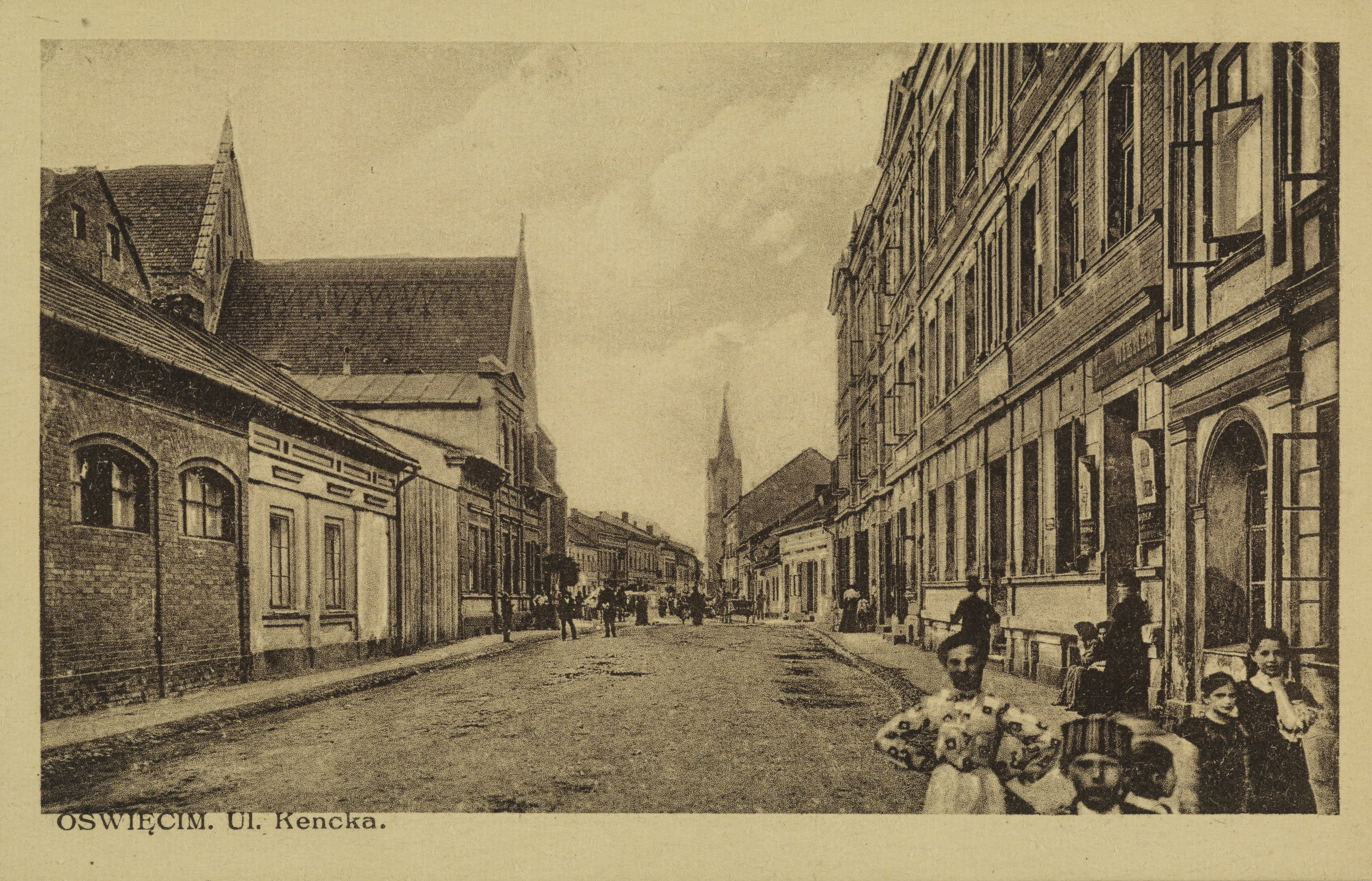
Oświęcim in the interwar period

In the second half of the 19th century, Oświęcim became an important rail junction. During the same period, the town burned in several fires, such as the fire of 23 August 1863, when two-thirds of Oświęcim burned, including the town hall and two synagogues; a new town hall was built between 1872 and 1875. In another fire in 1881, the parish church, a school, and a hospital burned down. In 1910, Oświęcim became the seat of a starosta, and in 1917–18 a new district, Nowe Miasto, was founded. In 1915, a high school was opened. After World War I, the town became part of the Second Polish Republic's Kraków Voivodeship (Województwo Krakowskie). Until 1932, Oświęcim was the seat of a county, but on 1 April 1932, the County of Oświęcim was divided between the County of Wadowice, and the County of Biała Krakowska.

=== World War II ===
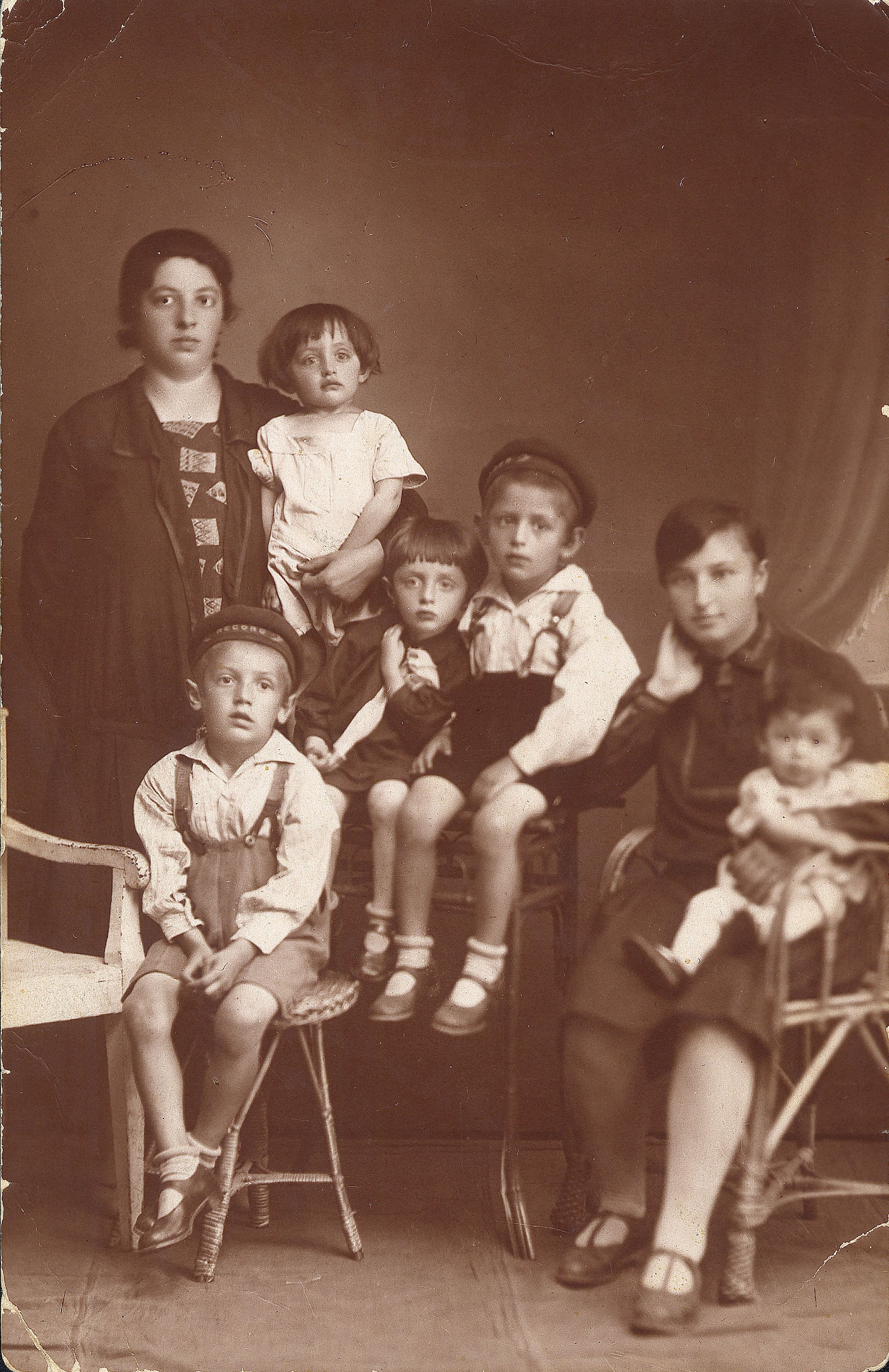
The Kleuger family, 1931/1933. Shimson Kleuger, pictured to the right of the center in a cap, would later become known as the last Jewish resident of Oświęcim

There were approximately 8,000 Jews in the town on the eve of World War II, comprising less than half the population. The Nazis annexed the area to Germany in October 1939 in the Gau of Upper Silesia, which became part of the "second Ruhr" by 1944.

In 1940, Nazi Germany used forced labor to build a new subdivision to house Auschwitz guards and staff, and built a large chemical plant of IG Farben in 1941 on the eastern outskirts of the town. Polish residents of several districts were forced to abandon their houses, as the Germans wanted to keep the area empty around Auschwitz concentration camp. They planned a 40 square kilometres (15 sq mi) buffer zone around the camp, and they expelled Polish residents in two stages in 1940 and 1941. All the residents of the Zasole district were forced to abandon their homes. In the Pławy and Harmęże districts, more than 90 percent of the buildings were destroyed and the residents of Pławy were transported to Gorlice to fend for themselves. Altogether, some 17,000 people in Oświęcim itself and surrounding villages were forced to leave their homes, eight villages were wiped off the map, and the population of Oświęcim shrank to 7,600 by April 1941.

The communist Soviet Red Army invaded the town and liberated the camp on 27 January 1945, and then opened two of their own temporary camps for German prisoners of war in the complex of Auschwitz-Birkenau. The Auschwitz Soviet camp existed until autumn 1945, and the Birkenau camp lasted until spring 1946. Some 15,000 Germans were interned there. Furthermore, there was a camp of Communist secret police (Urząd Bezpieczeństwa) near the rail station in the complex of former Gemeinschaftslager. Its prisoners were members of the NSDAP, Hitlerjugend, and BDM, as well as German civilians, the Volksdeutsche, and Upper Silesians who were disloyal to Poland.

=== After World War II ===
After World War II, new housing complexes in the town were developed with large buildings of rectangular and concrete constructions. The chemical industry became the main employer of the town and in later years, the service industry and trade were added. The many visits to the concentration camp memorial sites have become an important source of income for the town's businesses.

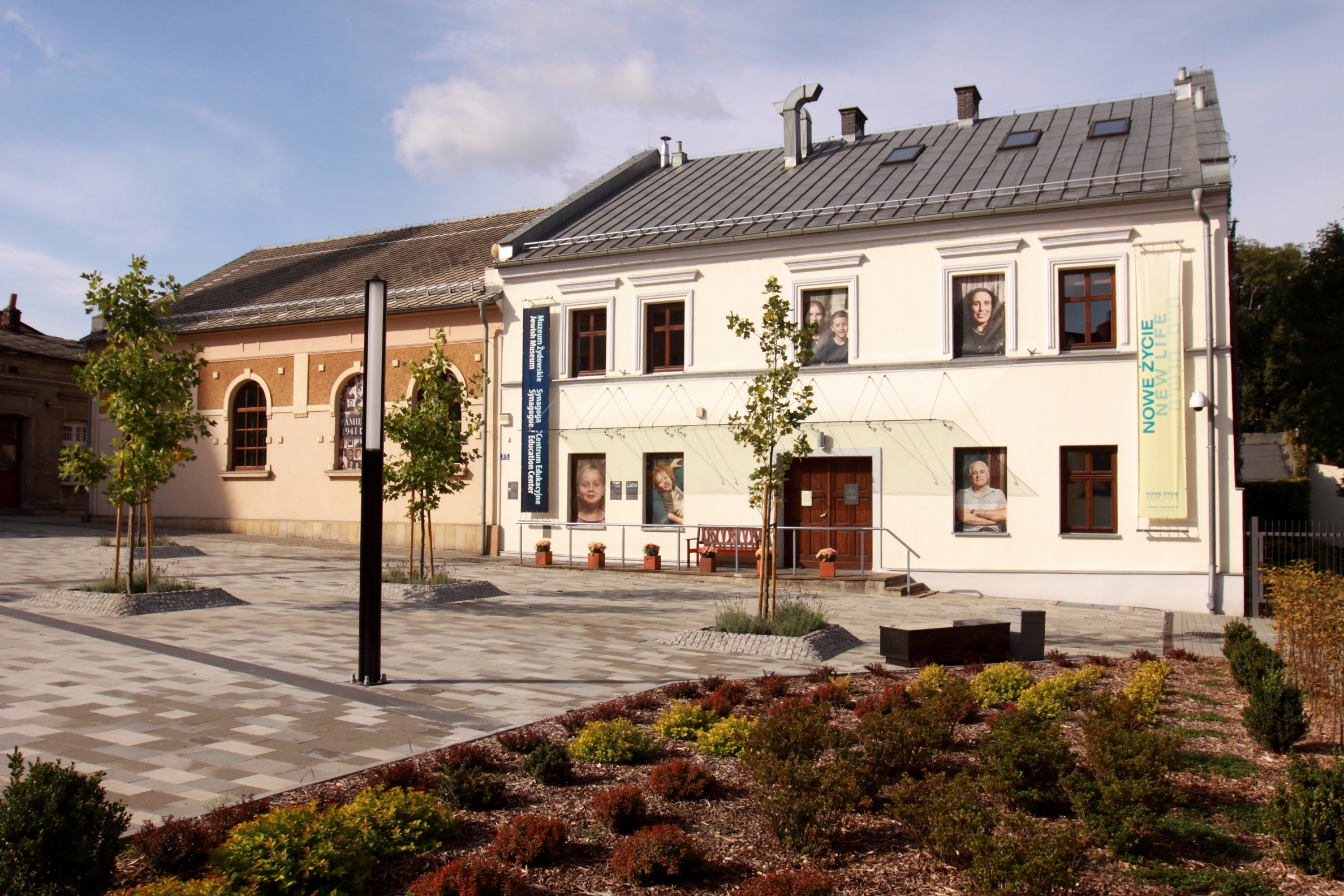
Jewish museum and former Oświęcim Synagogue

After the end of communism, by the mid-1990s, employment at the chemical works (named Firma Chemiczna Dwory SA from 1997 to 2007, Synthos SA since then) had dropped from 10,000 in the communist era to only 1,500 people. In 1952, the County of Oświęcim was re-created, and the town until 1975 belonged to Kraków Voivodeship. In 1975–1999, it was part of Bielsko-Biała Voivodeship. In 1979, Oświęcim was visited by Pope John Paul II, and on 1 September 1980, a local Solidarity office was created at the chemical plant. On 28 May 2006, the town was visited by Pope Benedict XVI.

== Culture ==
Oświęcim is culturally regarded as part of Upper Silesia. To this end, names such as 'Oświęcim Silesia' (Polish: Śląsk Oświęcimski) were used by Polish and German geographers, and Silesia was defined as the territory from the mouth of the river Warta to the Oder, up to Oświęcim. German nationalists of the 19th and 20th centuries argued that Oświęcim belonged to the German nation, as it is considered a part of Silesia, which led to its annexation directly into Nazi Germany instead of being included in the General Government.

Oświęcim is considered to be the eastern frontier of the Silesian language. As the easternmost point of linguistic Silesia, Silesian speech in Oświęcim is influenced by the Lesser Poland dialect and has distinct features such as partial mazuration (Polish: mazurzenie) - there is only one nasal 'a', which loses its nasality by becoming a non-labialised 'o' (rozpocoć – rozpocząć). Linguist Alexander Andrason outlines the linguistic area of Silesian borderland which Oświęcim is a part of, with features that distinguish it from other Silesian dialects as well as the Polish ones - for example, 'ą' and 'ę' are merged into /ɔ̃/ in Oświęcim Silesian.

== Local sports ==
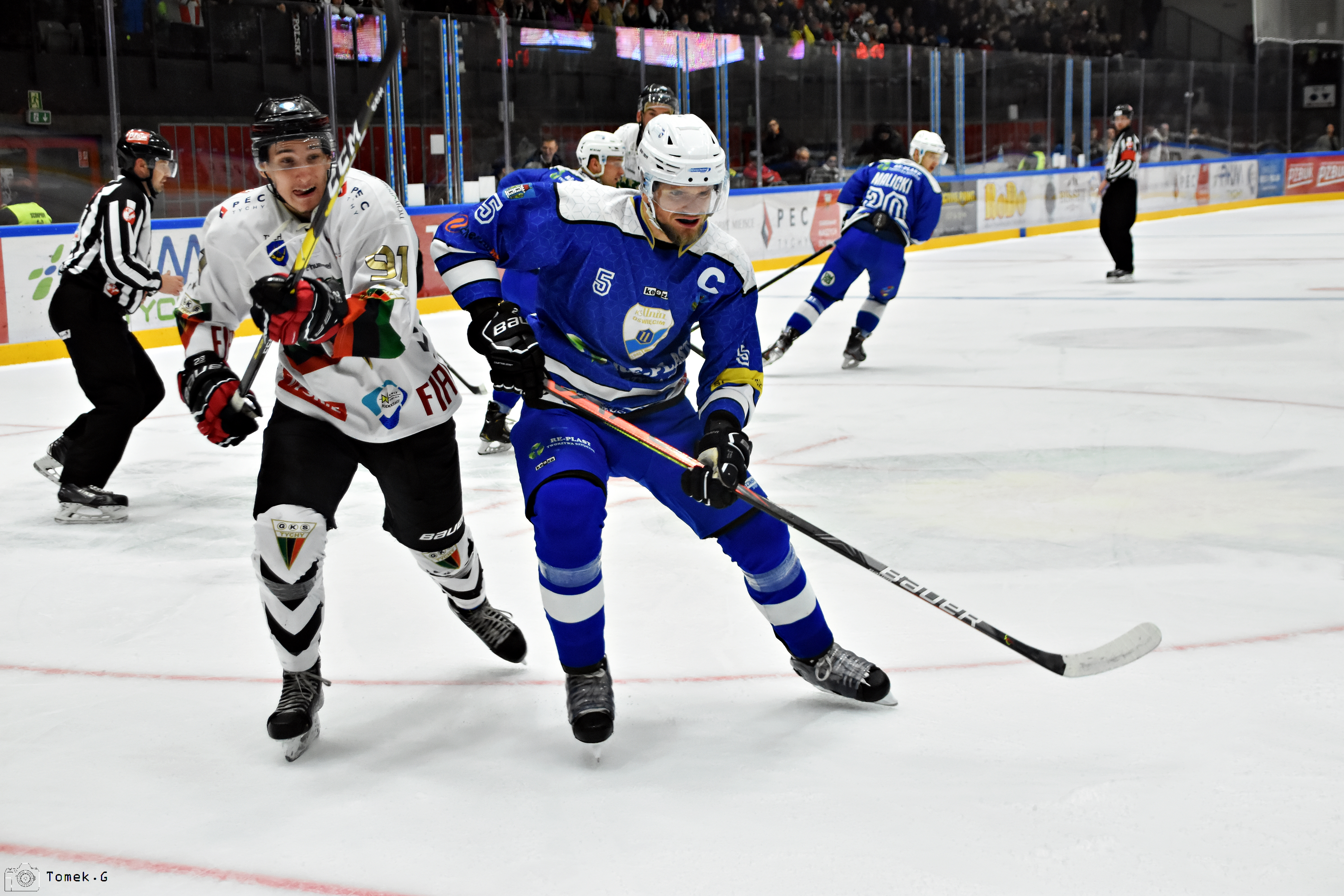
Polish Cup match between GKS Tychy and TH Unia Oświęcim in 2019

The sports club KS Unia Oświęcim was established in 1946. In 1999, the remaining four departments (ice hockey, swimming, figure skating, and association football) separated into their own clubs: TH Unia Oświęcim (ice hockey), UKŁF Unia Oświęcim (figure skating), UKP Unia Oświęcim (figure skating), Zasole-Unia Oświęcim (football), UKH Unia Oświęcim (youth ice hockey), and UKHK Unia Oświęcim (women's ice hockey). In the past, Unia had boxing, table tennis, volleyball, athletics, cycling, gymnastics, chess, motorcycle racing, lawn tennis, skiing, bridge, handball, and basketball departments. The ice hockey team, TH Unia Oświęcim, was crowned Polish champions 9 times, most recently in 2024.

Another sports club with a long tradition is KS Soła Oświęcim, an association football club founded in 1919.

== Notable people ==
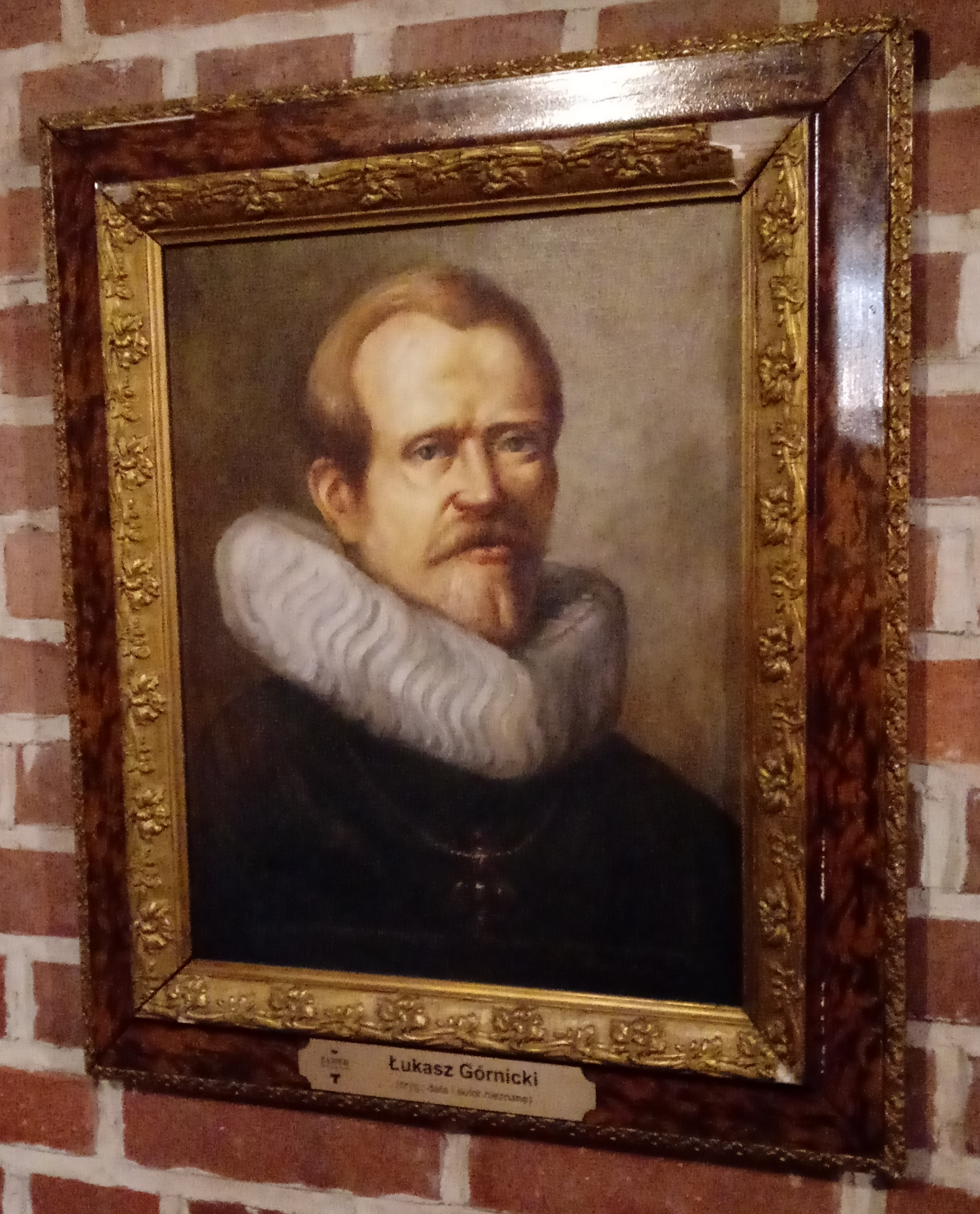
Portrait of Łukasz Górnicki

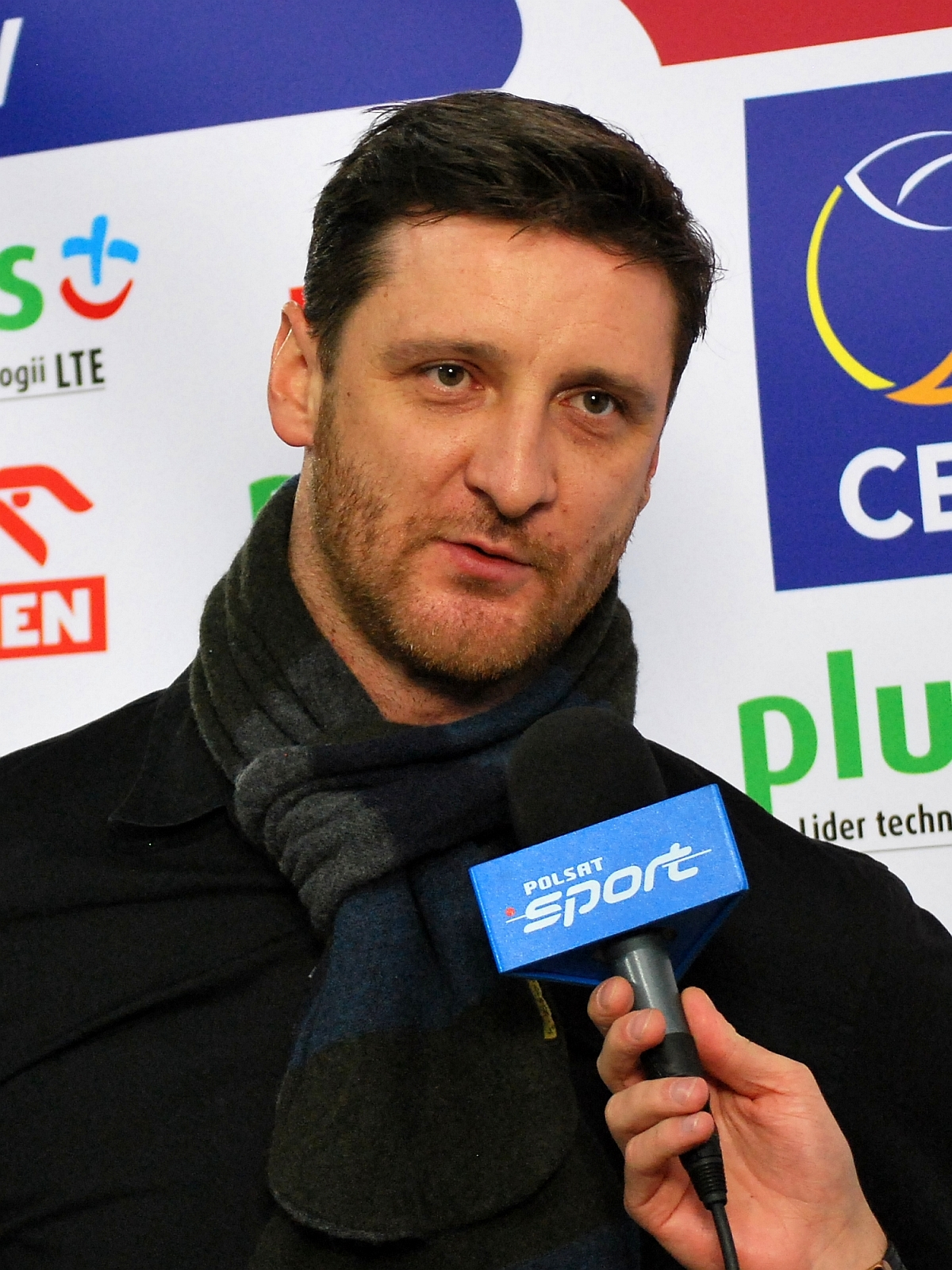
Piotr Gruszka, 2014

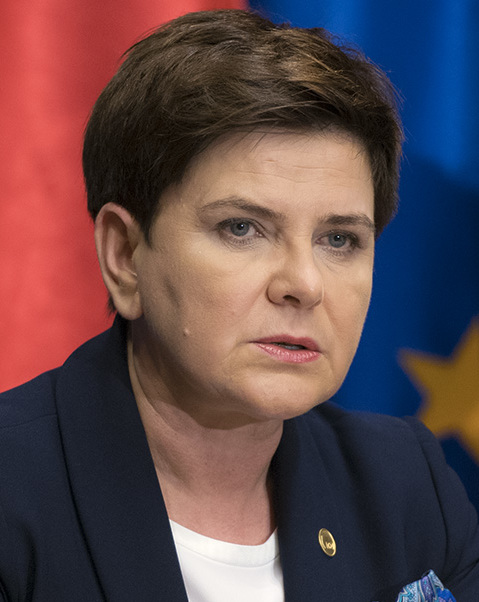
Beata Szydło, 2016

- Łukasz Górnicki (1527–1603), Polish Renaissance poet, humanist and political commentator
- Simon Syrenius (1540–1611), pre-Linnean Polish botanist and academic.
- Jeremiah Mattersdorf (ca. 1750-1805), rabbi and author
- Tadeusz Makowski (1882-1932), Polish painter who worked in France
- Tova Berlinski (1915–2022), Israeli painter
- Victor Zarnowitz (1919-2009), American economist
- Shimson Kleuger (1925–2000), known as "The Last Jew in Auschwitz".
- Henryk Waniek (born 1942), artist, stage-set designer and author-journalist
- Benzion Miller (born 1947), cantor; son of Aaron Daniel Miller, also cantor
- Marian Kasperczyk (born 1956), Polish-born French painter
- Beata Szydło (born 1963), 16th Prime Minister of Poland
- Ela Orleans (born 1971), composer, multi-instrumentalist and singer.
- Marcin Czarnik (born 1976), film and theatre actor

=== Sport ===
- David Enoch (1901–1949), Israeli chess player.
- Arkadiusz Skrzypaszek (born 1968) double gold medallist at the Modern pentathlon at the 1992 Summer Olympics
- Mariusz Siudek (born 1972), figure skater
- Dorota Siudek (born 1975), figure skater
- Piotr Gruszka (born 1977), volleyball player and world champion
- Sabina Wojtala (born 1981), figure skater
- Paweł Korzeniowski (born 1985) (swimmer)

=== Members of Parliament (Sejm) for this constituency ===
- Zbigniew Biernat (PiS),
- Józef Brynkus (K'15)
- Ewa Filipiak (PiS),
- Dorota Niedziela (PO),
- Marek Polak (PiS),
- Marek Sowa (PO),
- Jarosław Szlachetka (PiS),
- Beata Szydło (PiS),

== International relations ==
=== Twin towns and sister cities ===
Oświęcim is twinned with:

Sambir, Ukraine; Kerpen, Germany; Breisach, Germany	Arezzo, Italy; Catania, Italy; Cori, Italy; Cabanatuan, Philippines (unofficial)

== Gallery ==
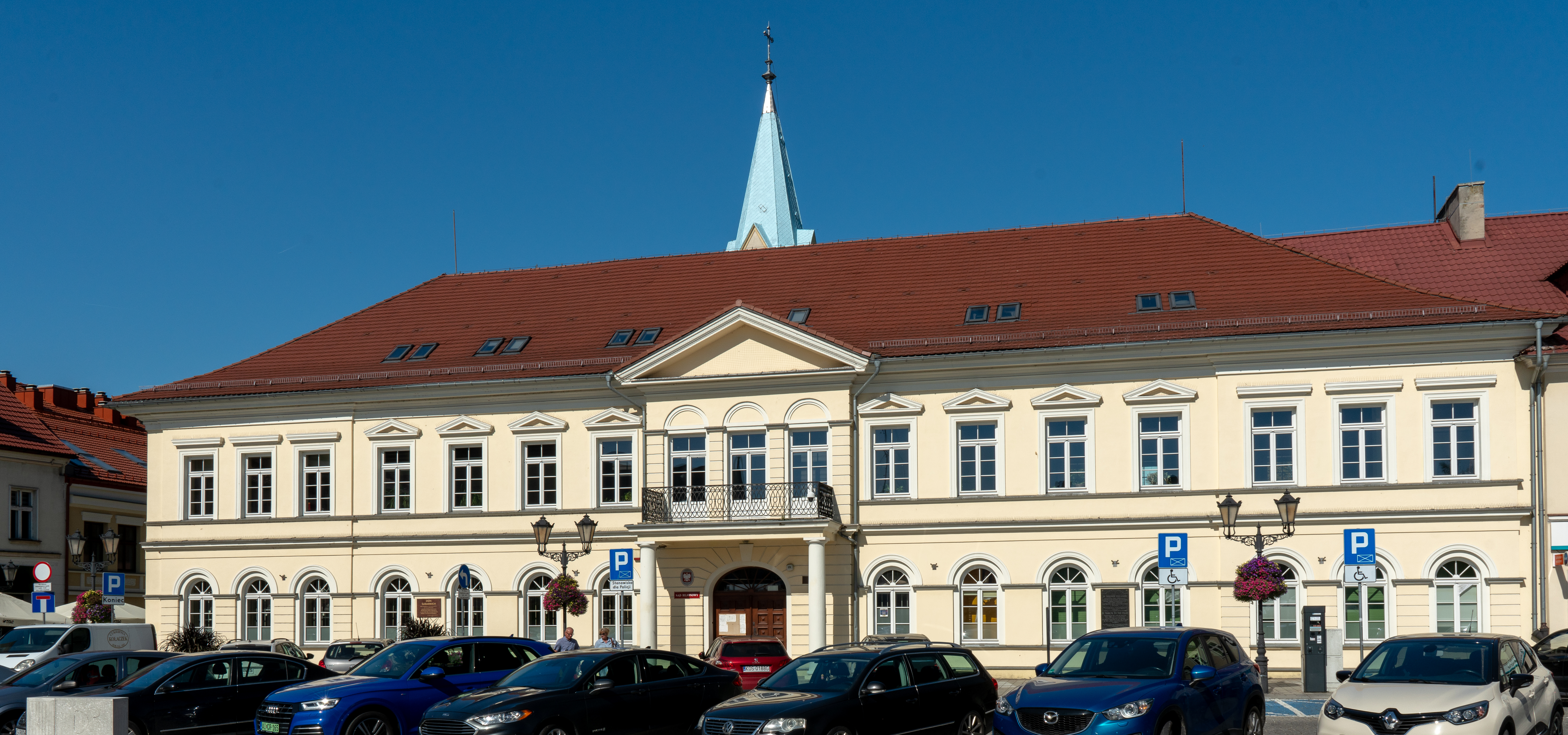
Old town hall

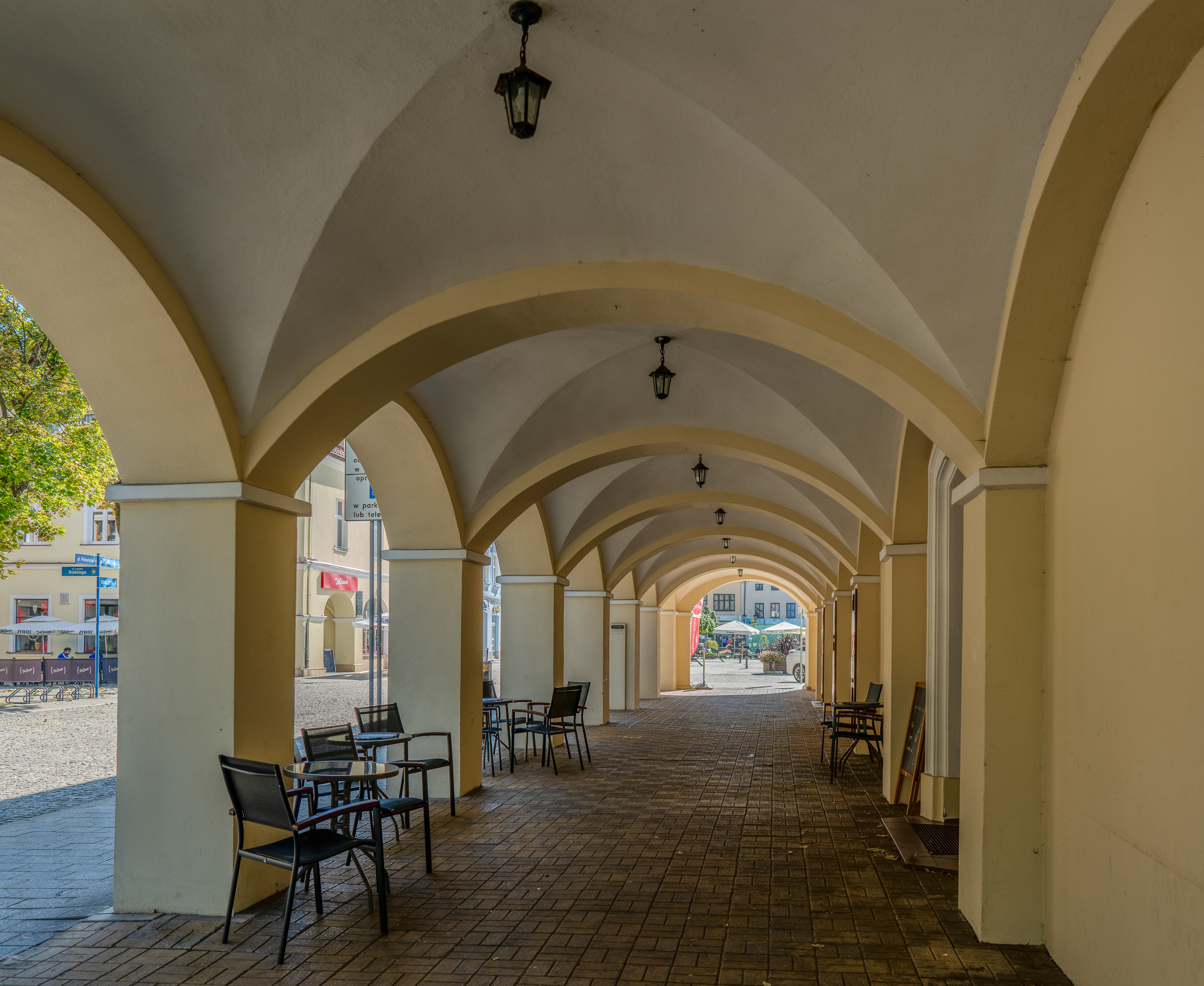
Arcades at Plebańska Street

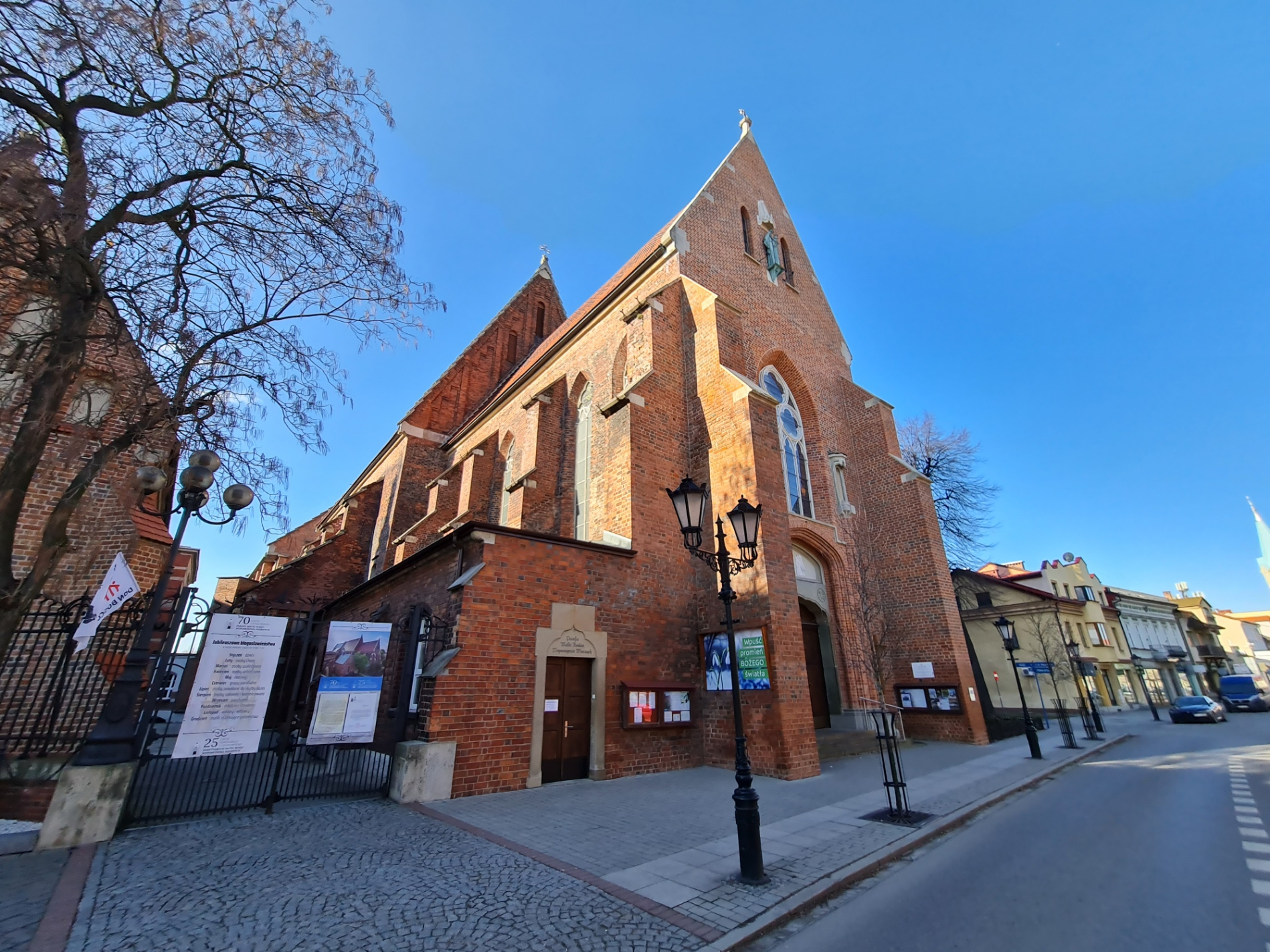
Medieval Our Lady Help of Christians church

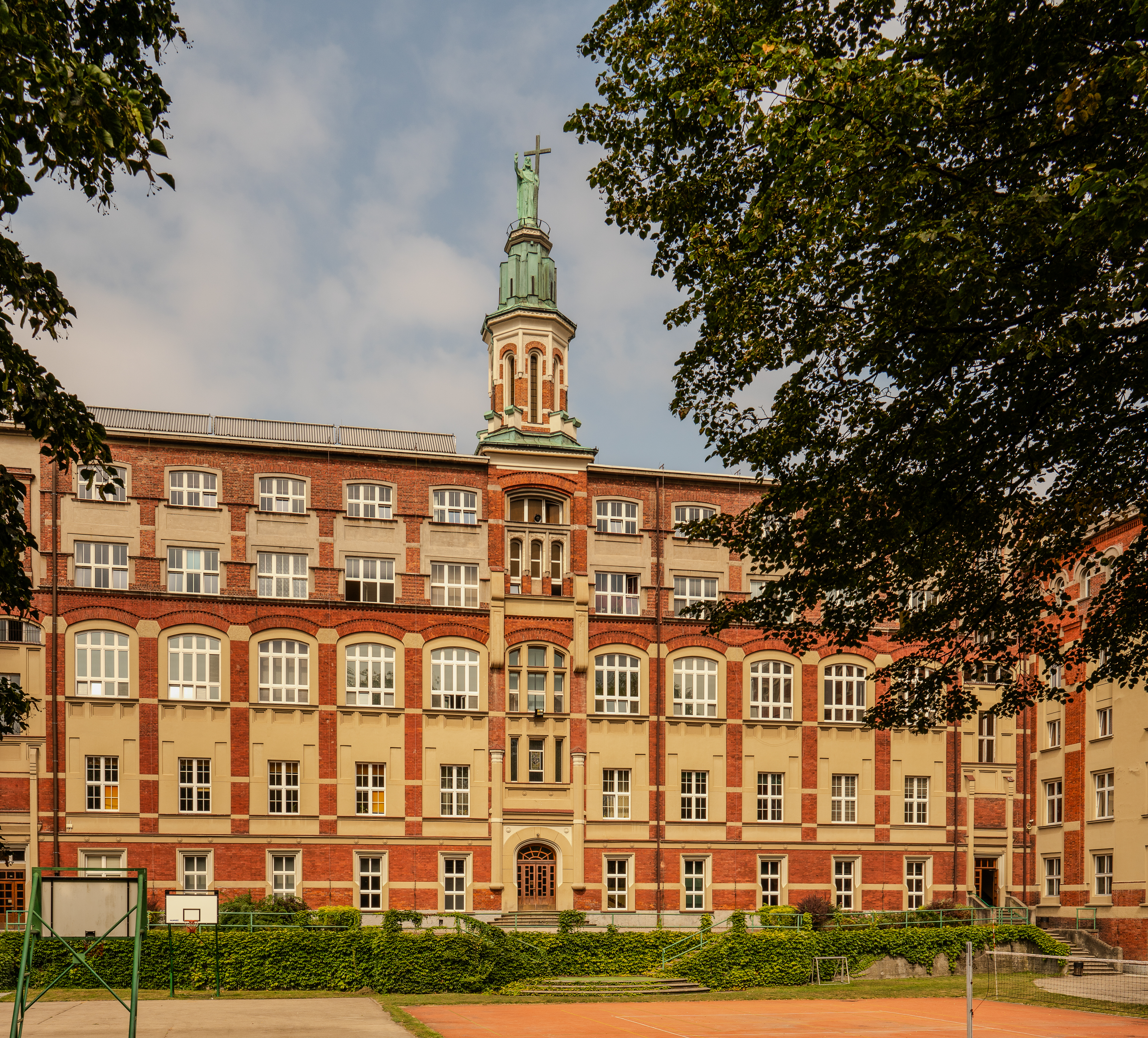
Salesians of Don Bosco monastery

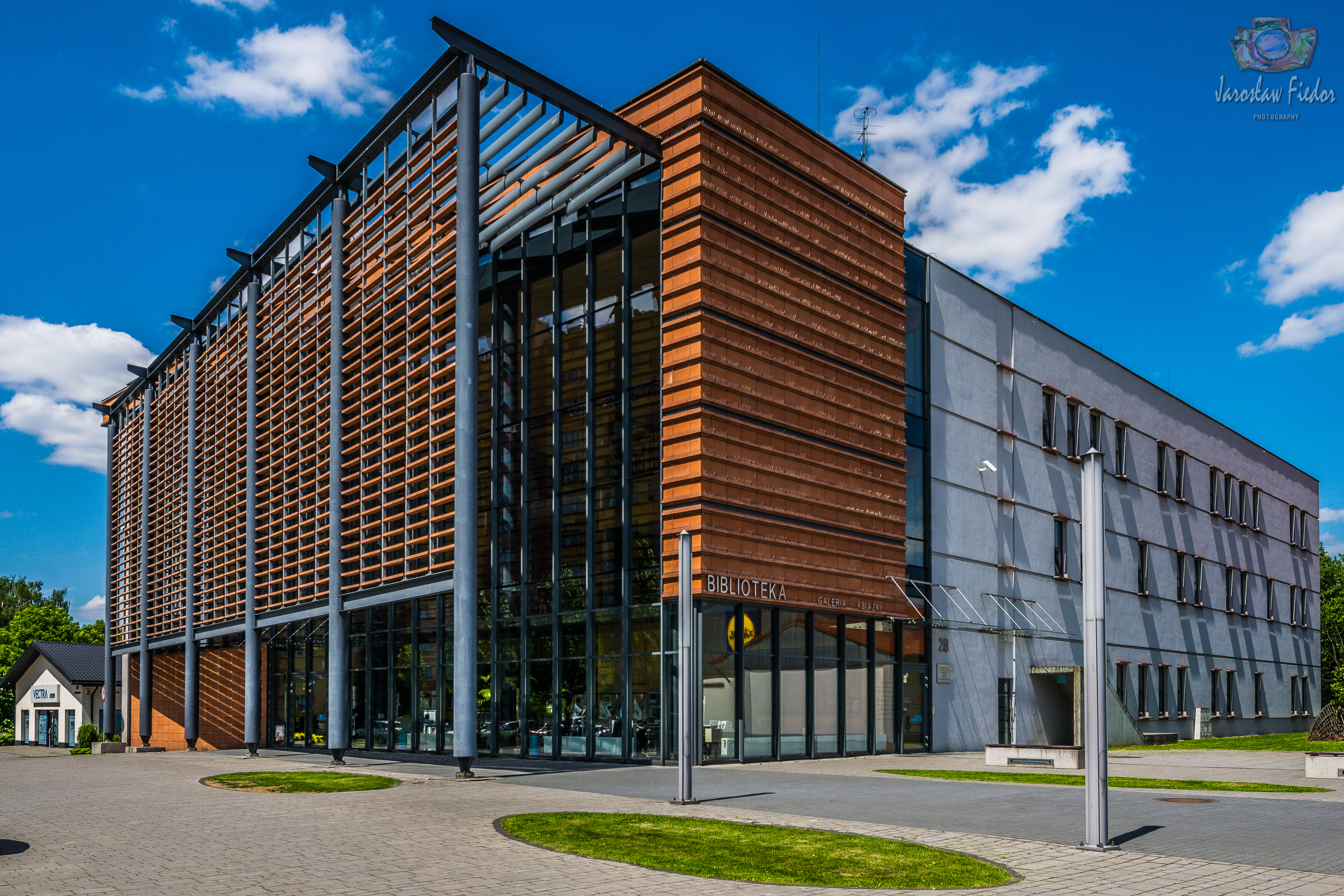
Municipal Library

== See also ==
- Auschwitz Jewish Center in Oświęcim
- Auschwitz Supermarket
- Jan Skarbek Square
- Oświęcim Jewish cemetery
- Tourism in Poland
- Mural trail in Oświęcim
