= Jan Skarbek =

Polish Roman Catholic priest and chronicler (1885–1951)

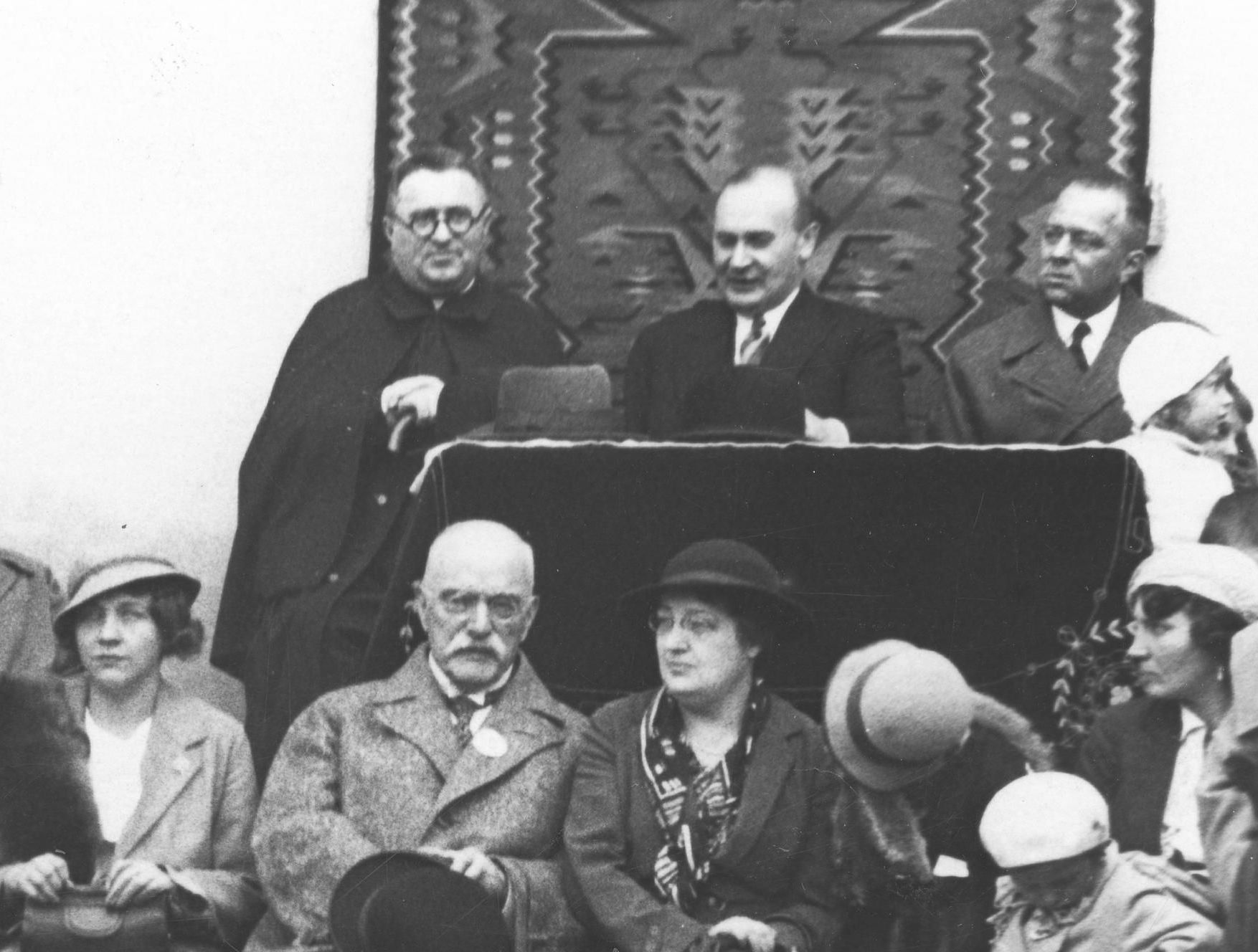
- Oświęcim authorities during a public event, Jan Skarbek standing at top left
- Born: 15 June 1885; Paszczyna, Poland
- Died: 2 February 1951; Oświęcim, Poland
- Education: Jagiellonian University in Kraków
- Church: Roman Catholic Church
- Congregations served: Roman Catholic Archdiocese of Kraków

Jan Skarbek (June 15, 1885, in Paszczyna near Dębica – February 2, 1951) was a Polish Roman Catholic priest, chronicler. Skarbek is one of the honorary citizens of Oświęcim – he was given this title from city authorities in 1934. He was known for cultivating interfaith relations in Oświęcim and maintaining friendly relations with local Jewish community.

== Biography ==
=== Education ===
In 1909 he was ordained a priest and a diploma in theology at the Jagiellonian University. He was also a law graduate of the same university in Kraków. He was ordained a priest in Kraków in 1909. His first pastoral institution was the parish of St. Adalbert and St. Catherine in Jaworzno. In 1914. it ended up in nearby Szczakowa, and a year later in Pleszów, near Krakow. In January 1926, Skarbek became the parish priest of the Assumption of the Blessed Virgin Mary parish in Oświęcim and held this position until his death.

=== Interwar period ===
He came to Oświęcim in 1926. He was a town councilor for many years. In 1934, he was awarded the title of an honorary citizen of Oświęcim. He was active in a number of charity, social and educational organizations, and was also involved in maintaining proper interfaith relations in Oświęcim. In 1929, he became chairman of the committee devoted to building and establishing the first secondary school in the city, which functions to the present day (today, the Stanisław Konarski Secondary School in Oświęcim).

=== World War II ===
During the war, Skarbek worked with the resistance movement at the Auschwitz concentration camp. He was involved in helping escapees from the KL Auschwitz camp, including by issuing false baptism records.

On the night of July 1–2, 1942, German policemen arrested the parish priest, treasurer and one of the vicars. The priests were beaten and the presbytery was plundered. The parish priest's housekeeper was also arrested. Skarbek was arrested for "storing excessive amounts of food in the presbytery". He was imprisoned in Oświęcim, Katowice, Mysłowice and Bielsko. After his release, the German authorities did not allow him to return to Oświęcim, and he did not return there until 1945; then he continued to act as a parish priest.

He died on February 2, 1951, in Oświęcim and was buried in the parish cemetery in Oświęcim.

== Activities for interfaith relations ==
Skarbek actively built good relations with the Jewish community of Oświęcim based on mutual respect. He maintained warm, friendly relations with many members of the Jewish community, including the local rabbi Elyahu Bombach and other rabbis. He encouraged the Catholic community of the town to be similarly open towards other religions. Skarbek met the rabbi of Oświęcim in the park, where they talked together in Hebrew.
