= Andrzej Pągowski =

Polish artist (born 1953)

Pągowski in 2026

Andrzej Pągowski (Polish pronunciation: [ˈandʐɛj pɔŋˈgɔfskʲi]; born 1953 in Warsaw) is a Polish artist who specializes in graphic design and poster art.

== Life and career ==
Pągowski graduated from The State University of Fine Arts in Poznan in 1978 and began to design posters, which has since become his main interest. In addition to posters, he designs theatrical settings, prints and catalogues.

One of the younger of the Third Generation of artists of Polish School of Posters, he easily made the transition from socialism to capitalism; in 1990, he created his own graphic studio, STUDIO P, which developed into an advertising agency in 1993 and continues in operation today. In 1992, he had become art director of the Polish edition of Playboy. As an artist, his individualized posters evoke a range of moods and ideas. He claims to have created a separate concept for each of his many posters, saying: “Every poster for me is an individual exercise different from the previous one.” His art can be found in many European museums as well as the Museum of Modern Art in New York. He has also had one-man shows in Stockholm, Paris, London, and Warsaw.

== Major awards ==
- 1978: 3rd Prize, VIII Biennale of Graphic Design, Brno (CS) International Exhibition of Advertising Art & Poster
- 1979: Tadeusz Trepkowski Prize, Warsaw
- 1980: 3rd Prize, Key Art Award, Posters, The Hollywood Reporter, Los Angeles
- 1981: 1st Prize, Key Art Award, Posters, The Hollywood Reporter, Los Angeles
- 1981: Tadeusz Trepkowski Prize, Warsaw
- 1982: ”Best Poster of the Month”, September (CYRK PC-242), Warsaw's Best Poster Competition
- 1983: 2nd Prize, Polish Poster Biennale, Katowice
- 1983: "Best Poster of the Year", Warsaw's Best Poster Competition
- 1984: 1st Prize, Key Art Award, Posters, The Hollywood Reporter, Los Angeles
- 1986: 1st & 3rd Prize, Key Art Award, Posters, The Hollywood Reporter, Los Angeles
- 1987: "Best Poster of the Year", Warsaw's Best Poster Competition
- 1987: 1st, 2nd & 3rd Prize, Key Art Award, Posters, The Hollywood Reporter, Los Angeles
- 1988: 3rd Prize, Key Art Award, Posters, The Hollywood Reporter, Los Angeles
- 1989: “City of Posters”, Zacheta Gallery, Warsaw
- 1990: 1st Prize, Key Art Award, Posters, The Hollywood Reporter, Los Angeles
- 2001: “City of Posters Supplement”, Zacheta Gallery, Warsaw
