= Second Ruhr =

Geographic area in World War II

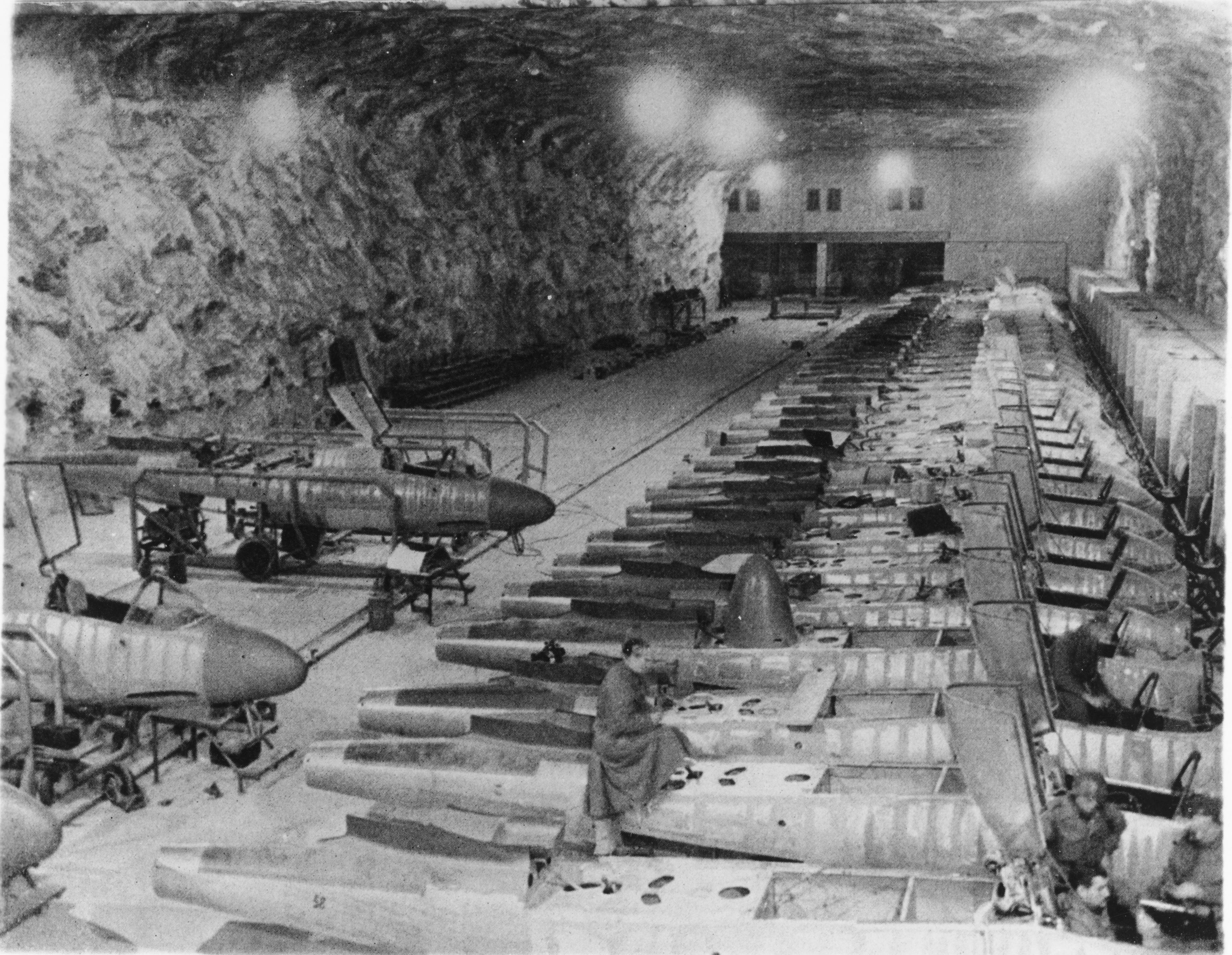
The Tarthun underground production of Heinkel He 162s in Magdeburg was captured in April 1945

The Second Ruhr was a World War II area that, according to a contemporary report in Flight, included the "Southern regions of Germany, the plateau of Bohemia, and Polish Silesia" where Nazi Germany's military production was dispersed away from Allied bomber bases in England. After the Allied bombing of German aircraft facilities had begun during Operation Pointblank, Nazi Germany dispersed the 27 larger aircraft works across 729 medium and very small plants (some in tunnels, caves, and mines), and oil production was also dispersed (e.g., Blechhammer). However, by October 1943, long-range bombers could reach the area (e.g., Marienburg).
