= List of Holocaust memorials and museums =

A number of organizations, museums and monuments are intended to serve as memorials to the Holocaust, the Nazi Final Solution, and its millions of victims.

Memorials and museums listed by country:

Other sections:

== Albania ==
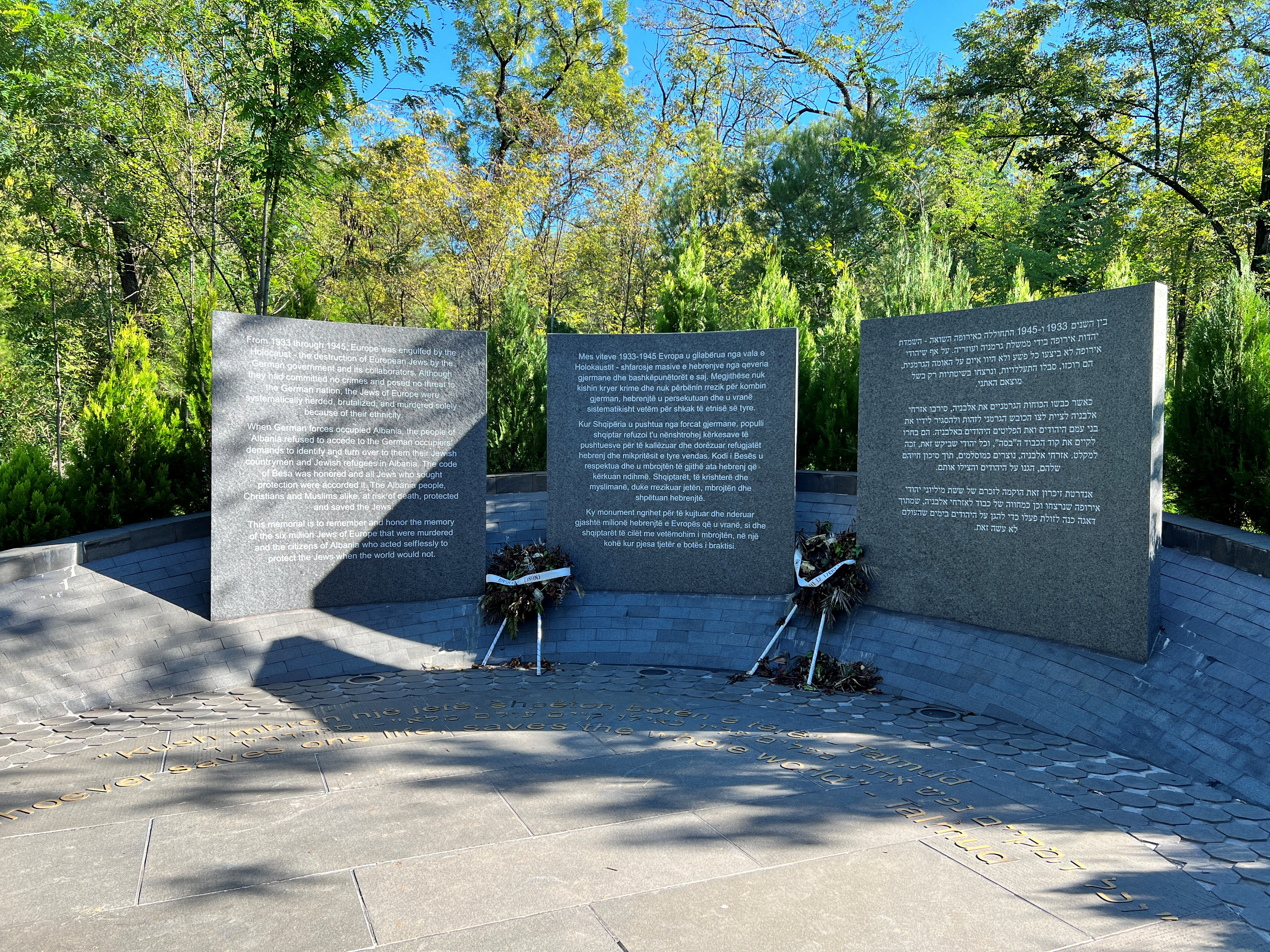
The Holocaust Memorial in the Grand Park of Tirana in Albania. It was designed by Stephen Jacobs and unveiled in 2020.

- Holocaust memorial, with inscription written in three stone plaques in English, Hebrew, and Albanian: “Albanians, Christians, and Muslims endangered their lives to protect and save the Jews.” (Tirana)

== Argentina ==
- The Holocaust Museum of Buenos Aires (Buenos Aires)
- National Memorial to the Victims of the Holocaust (Plaza de la Shoá, Buenos Aires)

== Australia ==
- Adelaide Holocaust Museum and Andrew Steiner Education Centre (Adelaide, South Australia)
- The Jewish Holocaust Centre (Melbourne, Victoria)
- Leo Baeck Centre for Progressive Judaism (Kew, Victoria) Holocaust Memorial
- Melbourne General Cemetery Holocaust Memorial (Parkville, Victoria)
- Sydney Jewish Museum (Sydney)
- Magen Shoah, The Central Synagogue (Sydney)

== Austria ==
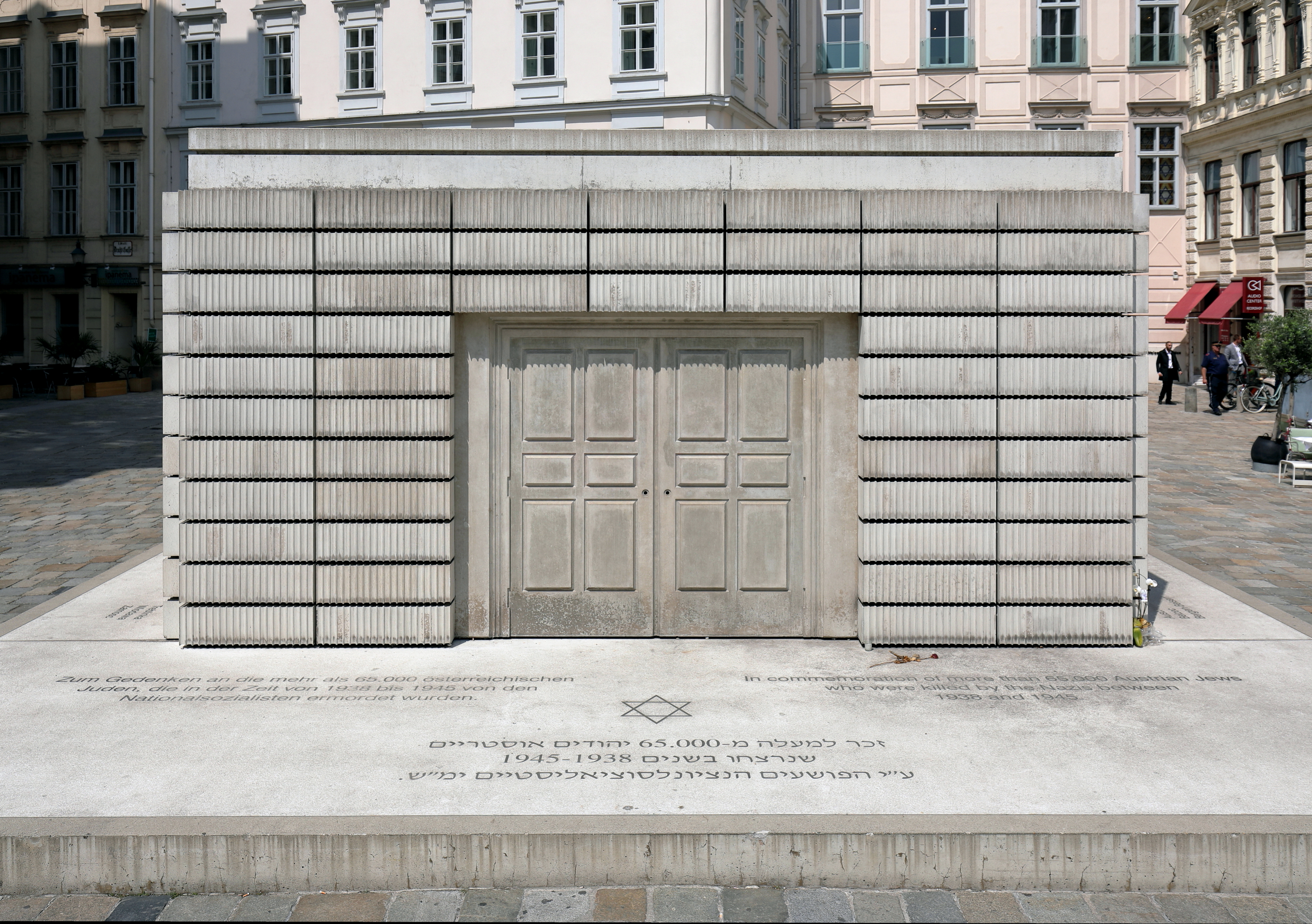
The Judenplatz Holocaust Memorial, Vienna

- The Judenplatz Holocaust Memorial (Vienna)
- Holocaust and Tolerance Center Styria, "House of Names" (Holocaust und Toleranzzentrum Steiermark, Haus der Namen) (Graz)
- House of Responsibility (Braunau am Inn)
- Mauthausen Concentration Camp Memorial (Mauthausen)
- Learning and memorial site Charlotte Taitl House (Ried im Innkreis)
- Memorial against war and fascism (Vienna)
- Pogrom Monument
- Memorial to the Jews of Zelem
- Memorial Site Hartheim Castle (Alkoven)

== Belarus ==
- The Pit, Minsk

== Belgium ==
- Kazerne Dossin: Memorial, Museum and Documentation Centre on Holocaust and Human Rights (Mechelen)
- National Memorial to the Jewish Martyrs of Belgium (Anderlecht, Brussels)

== Brazil ==
- Holocaust victims memorial at Rio de Janeiro – Cemitério Israelita do Caju (sephardic) – inaugurated in September 1975
- Holocaust victims memorial at Salvador – Cemitério Israelita da Bahia – inaugurated in 2007
- Holocaust Museum in Curitiba – inaugurated in 2011 (Paraná)
- Memorial of Jewish Immigration and of the Holocaust, São Paulo – 2011

== Bulgaria ==
- Jewish Historical Museum (Sofia)
- Dimitar Peshev Museum (Kyustendil)
- Monument of Gratitude (Plovdiv)

== Canada ==
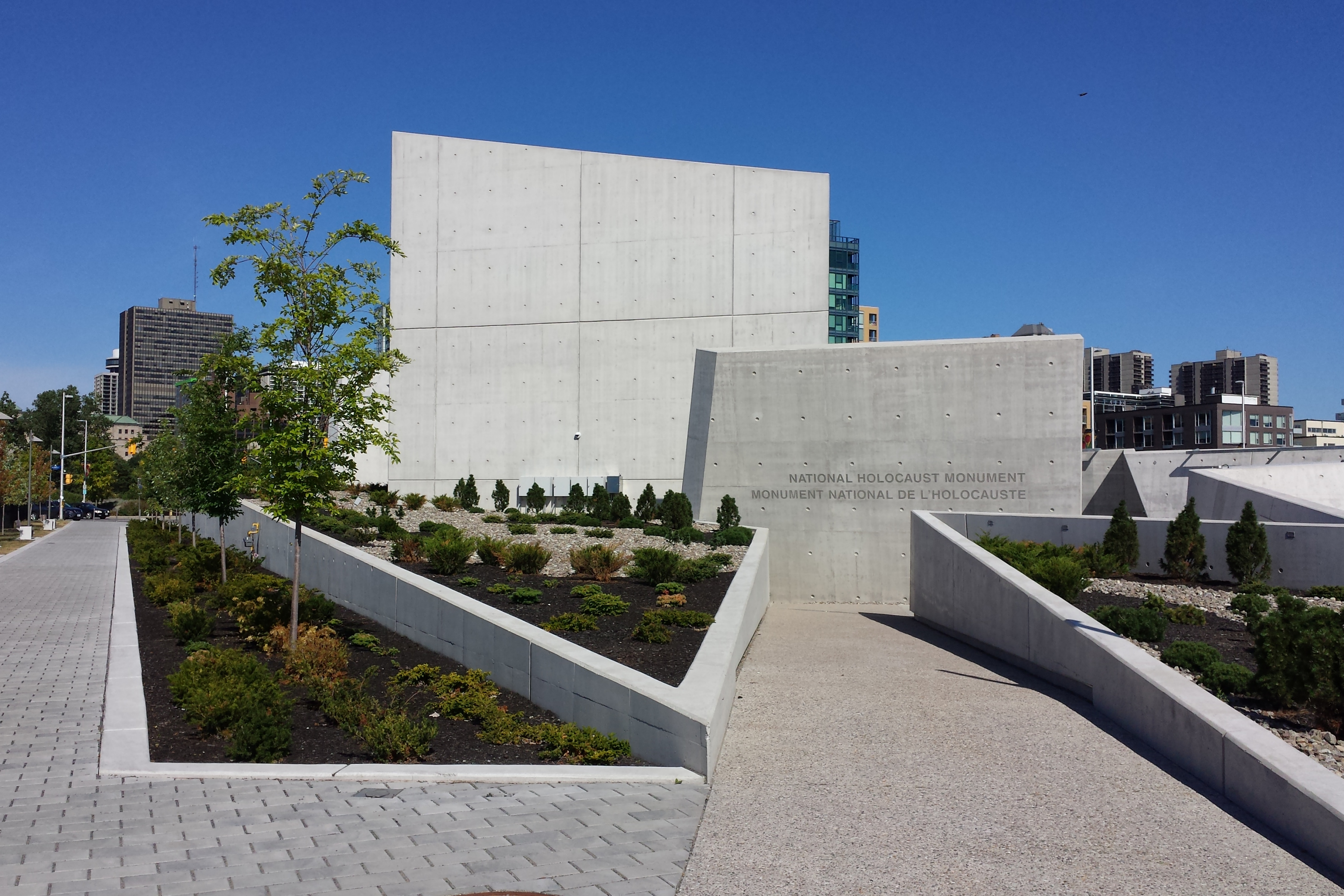
The National Holocaust Monument, Ottawa

- Holocaust Memorial sculpture (Edmonton, Alberta)
- Sarah and Chaim Neuberger Holocaust Education Centre (Toronto)
- The Canadian Society for Yad VaShem Holocaust Memorial (Toronto, Earl Bales Park)
- The Vancouver Holocaust Education Centre (Vancouver, British Columbia)
- Montreal Holocaust Museum
- Ottawa National Holocaust Monument

== China ==
- Shanghai Jewish Refugees Museum
- "Wall of Shanghai List" and Holocaust Memorial statue (Shanghai)

== Croatia ==
- The Jasenovac Memorial Area (Jasenovac)
- Memorial Centre Lipa Remembers (Lipa, Matulji)

== Cuba ==
- Holocaust Memorial Santa Clara
- Sephardic Center Holocaust Exhibit (Havana)

== Czech Republic ==
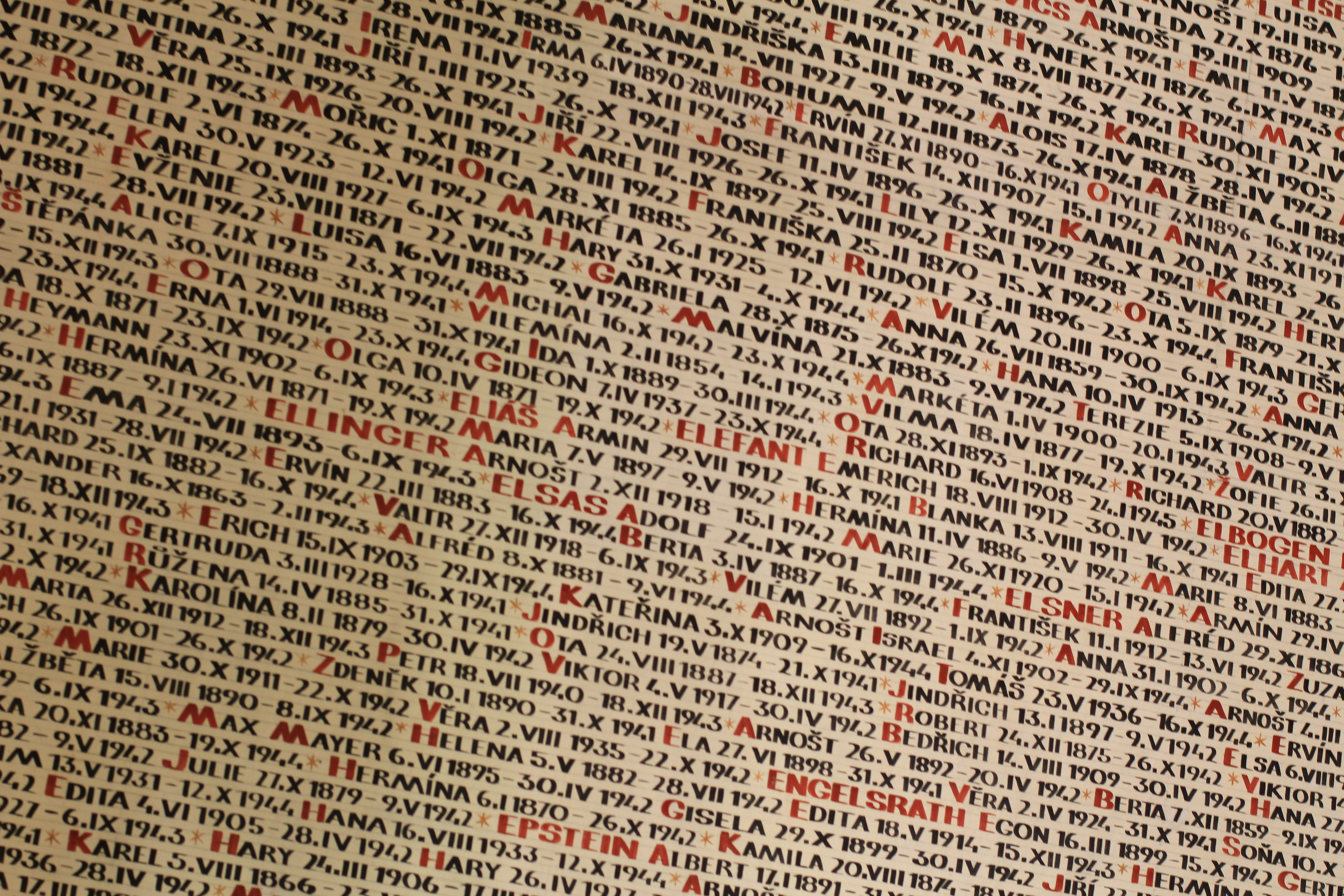
Names of Holocaust victims in the Pinkas Synagogue in Prague

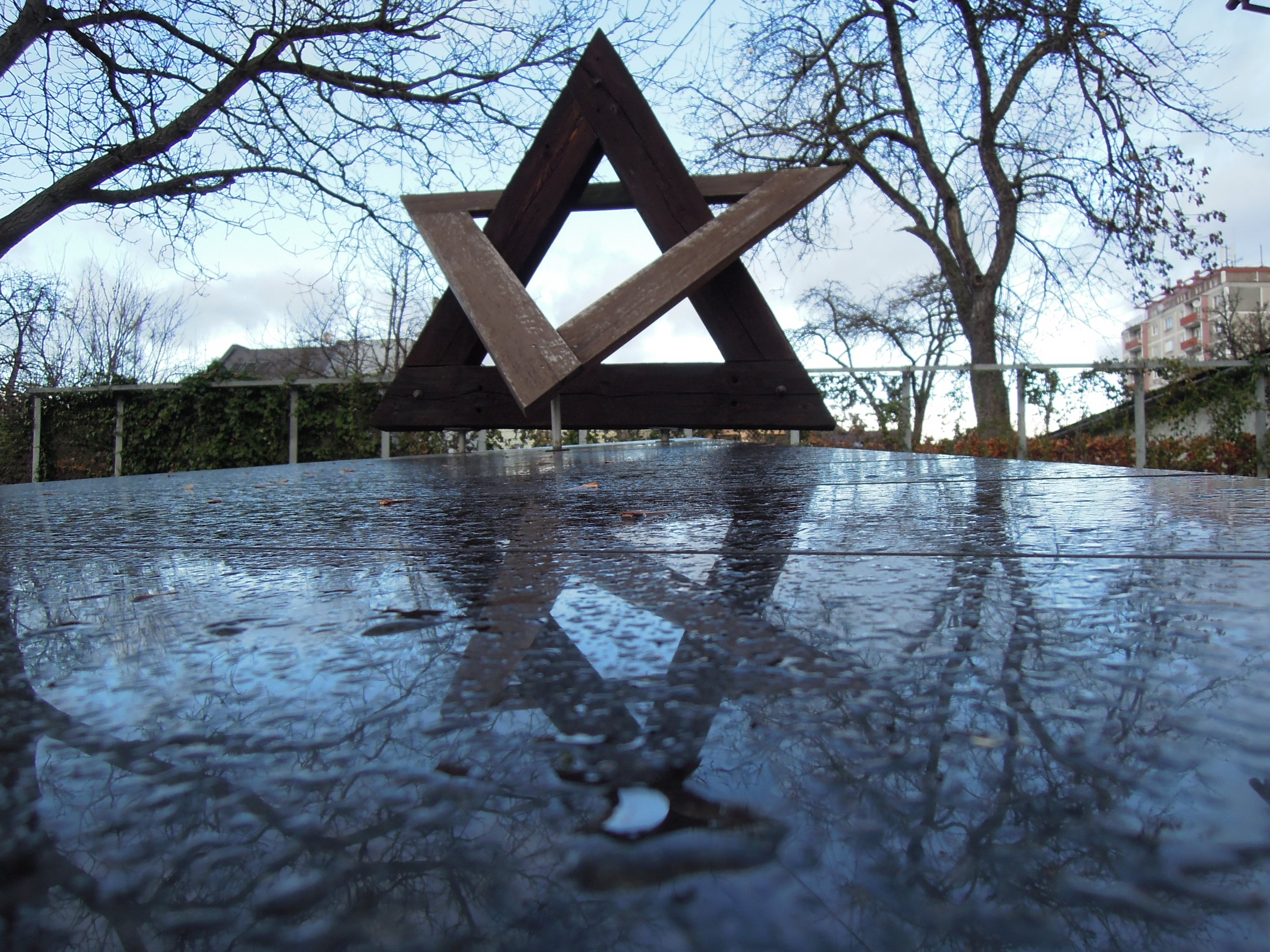
Holocaust memorial in Valašské Meziříčí, Czech Republic

- Holocaust memorial (Valašské Meziříčí)
- Pinkas Synagogue/Old Jewish Cemetery (Prague)
- The Memorial of Silence (Praha–Bubny railway station)
- Theresienstadt concentration camp (Terezín)
- The Memorial to the Holocaust of the Roma and Sinti in Moravia (Hodonín u Kunštátu)
- The Memorial to the Holocaust of the Roma and Sinti in Bohemia (Lety u Písku)

== Ecuador ==
- Casa Museo Trude Sojka (in memory of a Holocaust survivor and artist)

== Estonia ==
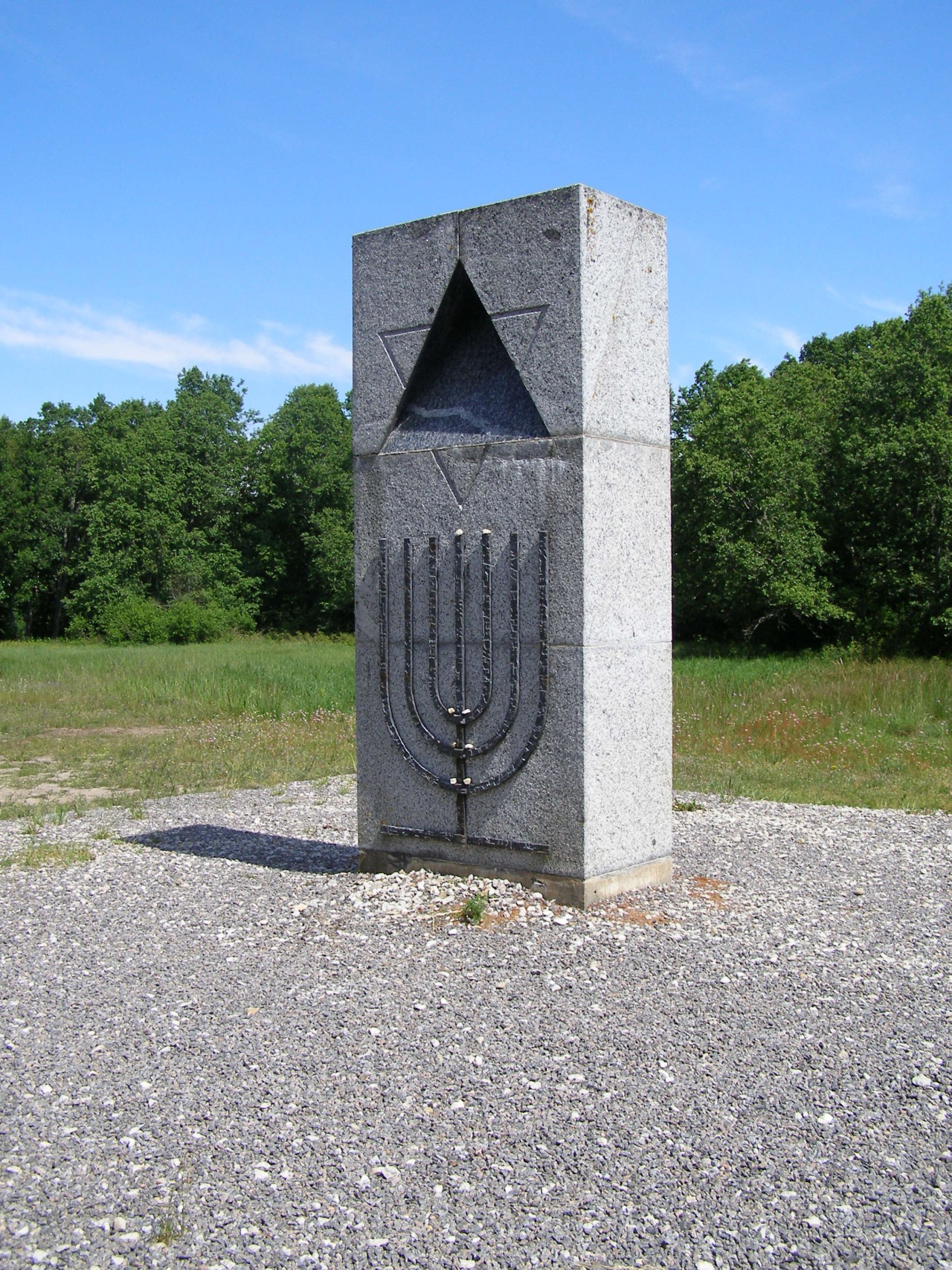
Holocaust memorial at the site of Klooga concentration camp, Estonia

- Holocaust memorial at the site of Klooga concentration camp (Klooga)
- Memorial at the site of Kalevi-Liiva (Jägala)
- About "Between Life and Death. Stories of Rescue during the Holocaust"

== France ==
- Maison d'Izieu mémorial des enfants juifs exterminés, Izieu
- Centre de la mémoire d'Oradour, Oradour-sur-Glane
- Holocaust museum at Drancy internment camp (Mémorial de la Shoah de Drancy)
- Center of Contemporary Jewish Documentation (Paris)
- Mémorial de la Shoah (Paris)
- Mémorial des Martyrs de la Déportation (Paris)
- Memorial to the patients of the Clermont psychiatric ward
- Memorial at Gurs internment camp
- Royallieu-Compiègne internment camp memorial
- Camp des Milles memorial (Aix-en-Provence)
- Vélodrome d’Hiver memorial (Paris)
- Memorial Museum to the Children of Vel d'Hiv (Orléans)
- European Centre of Deported Resistance Members and Struthof Museum at the former Natzweiler-Struthof concentration camp

== Germany ==
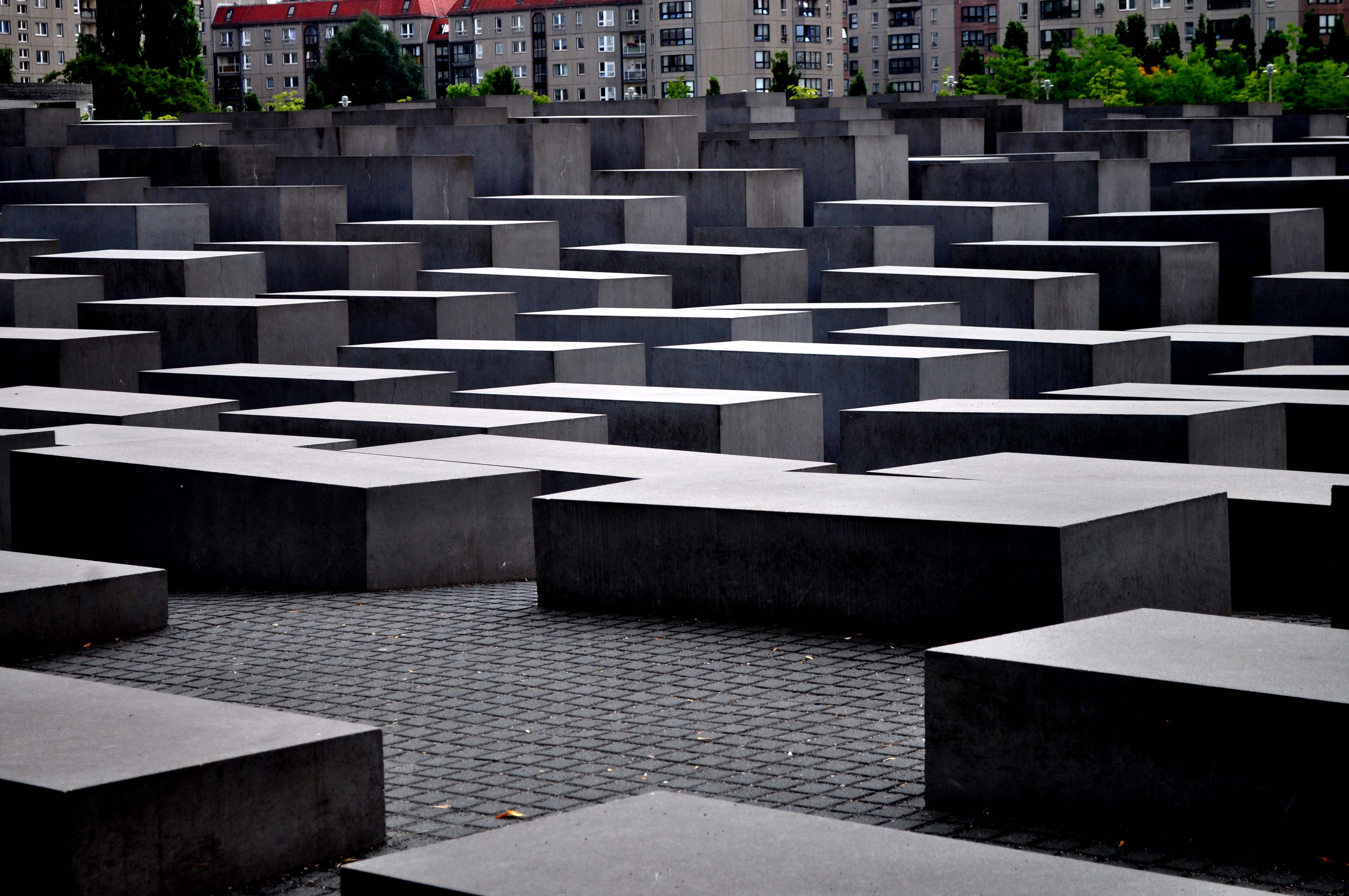
Memorial to the Murdered Jews of Europe (Berlin)

- House of the Wannsee Conference
- Jewish Museum Berlin
- Memorial to the Murdered Jews of Europe (Berlin)
- Memorial to the Homosexuals Persecuted under the National Socialist Regime (Berlin)
- Memorial to the Sinti and Roma Victims of National Socialism (Berlin)
- Französische Kapelle (Soest)
- Memorial to the Victims of National Socialist 'Euthanasia' Killings (German: Gedenk- und Informationsort für die Opfer der nationalsozialistischen »Euthanasie«-Morde) (Note: The German national memorial to the people with disabilities systematically murdered by the Nazis was dedicated in 2014 in Berlin. It is located in Berlin in a site next to the Tiergarten park, which is the former location of a villa at Tiergartenstrasse 4 where more than 60 Nazi bureaucrats and doctors worked in secret under the "T4" program to organize the mass murder of sanatorium and psychiatric hospital patients deemed unworthy to live.)
- Stolperstein – Holocaust memorials all over Germany and in 21 further European countries
- Topf & Söhne – Builders of the Auschwitz Ovens. Museum and Place of Remembrance (Erfurt)
- European Holocaust Memorial (Landsberg am Lech)
- Dachau Concentration Camp Memorial Site
- Nordenstadt Memorial
- Wollheim Memorial
- Eckerwald Memorial
- KZ-Transport 1945 Memorial
- Angel of Peace (Mannheim)
- Freight Wagon Memorial
- Forced Laborer Memorial Transit, Nuremberg
- European Holocaust Memorial in Landsberg
- Memorial Neuer Börneplatz
- Concentration Camp Memorial Hailfingen-Tailfingen
- Documentation Centre NS Forced Labor
- The Leipzig Nazi Forced Labour Memorial on the grounds of the Wissenschaftspark Leipzig.
- Memorial to Jewish Citizens, Leipzig
- Memorial in memory of the burning of books, Berlin
- Memorial at the Frankfurt Grossmarkthalle
- Jewish Cemetery (Anklam)
- "Dejudaization Institute" Memorial (Eisenach)
- Memorial to the murdered Jews of Hanover
- Flossenbürg Concentration Camp Memorial
- DenkOrt Deportationen 1941-1944

== Greece ==
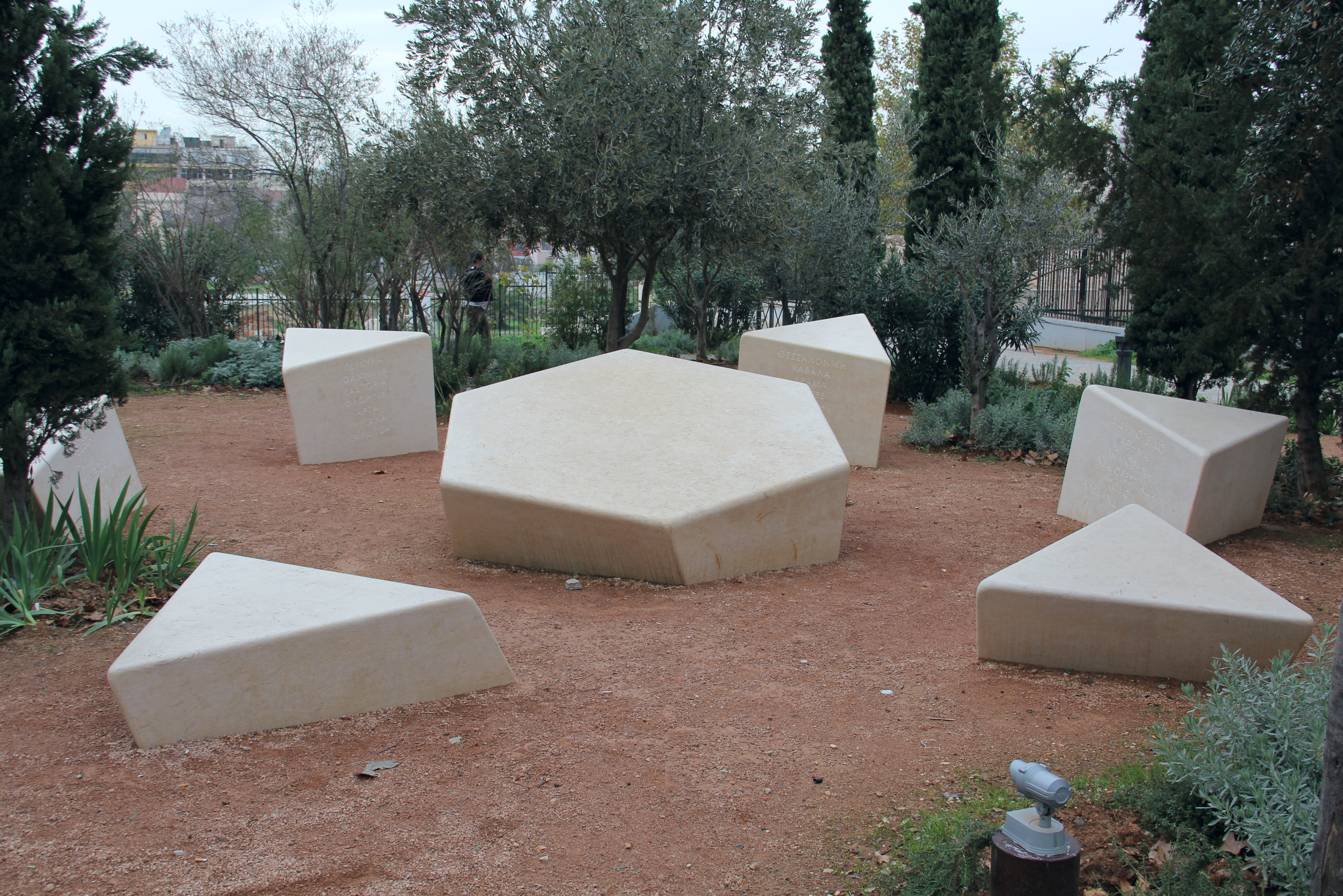
The Athens Holocaust Memorial, dedicated in 2010

- The Athens Holocaust Memorial, outside the archaeological site of Kerameikos (Athens)
- Cemetery and Monument for the Victims of the Holocaust – 3rd Cemetery of Athens, Nikea (Piraeus)
- Monument to Young Jews (in memory of young Jews murdered in the Holocaust) – Pafos Square, Athens
- Jewish Museum of Greece – Shoah Exhibit (Athens)
- Jewish Museum of Thessaloniki – Shoah Exhibit (Thessaloniki, Central Macedonia)
- Holocaust Museum of Greece, Thessaloniki (under construction)
- Menorah in flames sculpture commemorating deportation of the Thessaloniki Jews
- Monument of the Victims of the Holocaust in the Jewish Martyrs square (Rhodes)
- Rhodes Jewish Museum
- Holocaust Memorial of Corfu (New Fortress Square, Corfu)

== Guatemala ==
- Museum of the Holocaust (Guatemala) - Museo del Holocausto in Guatemala city

== Hong Kong ==
- Hong Kong Holocaust and Tolerance Centre (Hong Kong)

== Hungary ==
- Holocaust Memorial Center, Budapest
- Dohány Street Synagogue, Budapest
- Shoes on the Danube Bank, Budapest
- Emanuel Tree in Dohány Street Synagogue, Budapest

== Indonesia ==
- Indonesia Holocaust Museum, (Tondano)

== Israel ==
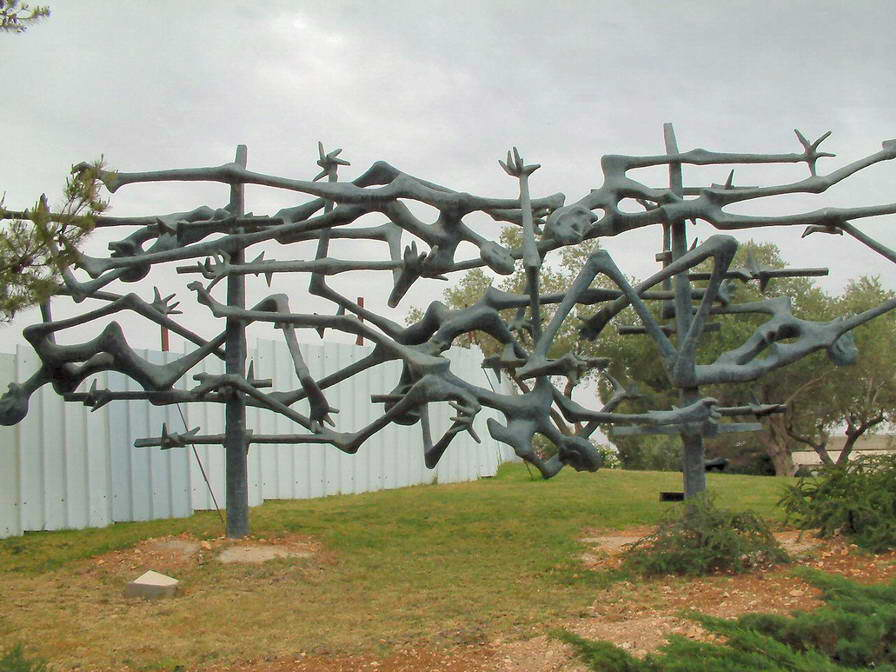
Sculpture at Yad Vashem in Jerusalem

- Yad Vashem, the Holocaust Martyrs' and Heroes' Remembrance Authority (Jerusalem)
- Beit Terezin (in Kibbutz Givat Haim (Ihud))
- Ghetto Fighters' House (Kibbutz Lohamei HaGeta'ot)
- Massuah Institute for the Study of the Holocaust (Kibbutz Tel Yitzhak)
- From Holocaust to Revival Museum (Kibbutz Yad Mordechai)
- Bet Ha'Edut Testimony House (Nir Galim)
- Kiryat Białystok Archive and Community Center (Yehud)
- Chamber of the Holocaust (Mount Zion, Jerusalem)
- Ani Ma'amin Holocaust Museum (Jerusalem)
- Forest of the Martyrs (Jerusalem)
- LGBT Memorial to LGBT people persecuted by the Nazis (Tel Aviv)
- The sculpture garden of Holocaust to resurrection (Karmiel)
- Memorial to the Deportation of Jews from France
- Monument to the children in Yad Vashem (Jerusalem)
- Holocaust and Revival Memorial Sculpture, by Igael Tumarkin (Rabin Square, Tel Aviv)
- Anne Frank Children's Human Rights Memorial, Maaleh Adumim

== Italy ==
- Memoriale della Shoah (Milan)
- Museo della Deportazione (Prato)
- Shoah Museum (Rome)
- Museo Diffuso della Resistenza Torino (Turin)
- Museum of Italian Judaism and the Shoah (Ferrara)
- Great Synagogue of Rome (Rome)
- Museo Ebraico di Roma (Rome)

== Japan ==
- Holocaust Education Center (Fukuyama, Hiroshima)
- Tokyo Holocaust Education Resource Center (Tokyo)
- Anne's Rose Church (Nishinomiya, Hyogo)
- Port of Humanity Tsuruga Museum (Tsuruga, Fukui)
- Chiune Sugihara Memorial Hall
- Auschwitz Peace Museum (Shirakawa, Fukushima)

== Latvia ==
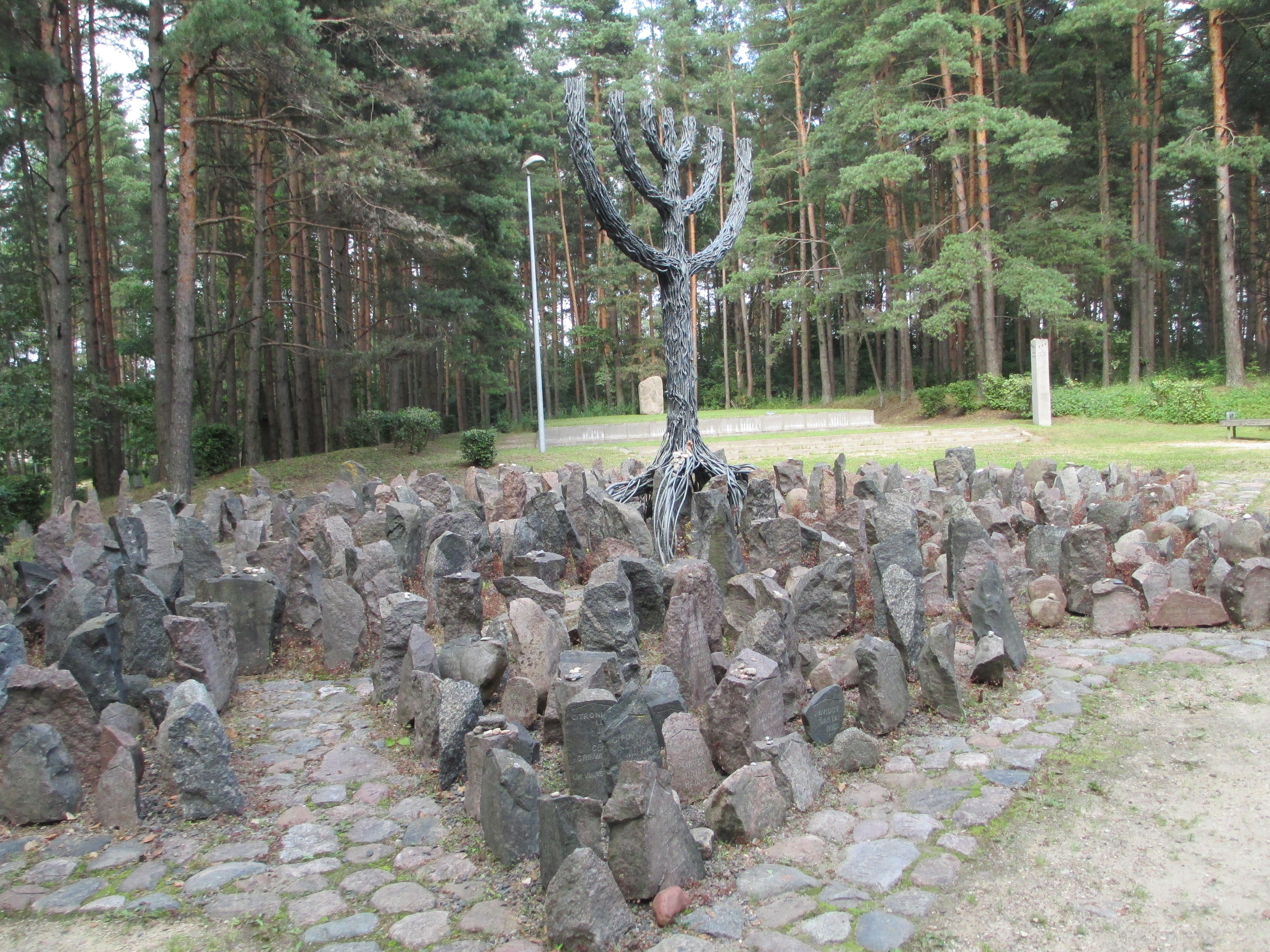
Memorial at the site of the Rumbula massacre, Latvia

- Memorial complex at Rumbula
- Memorial complex at Salaspils
- Museum of Tolerance at the site of Kaiserwald
- Museum "Jews in Latvia"
- Riga Ghetto and Latvian Holocaust museum

== Lithuania ==
- Holocaust Exhibition at the Vilna Gaon Jewish State Museum (Vilnius)
- Ponary Massacre Memorial (Paneriai)
- Lost Shtetl Museum (Šeduva)
- Ninth Fort Museum and Ninth Fort memorial (Kaunas)
- Sugihara House (Kaunas)
- The Green House Holocaust Museum (Vilnius)

== Luxembourg ==
- Memorial to the victims of the Shoah (Luxembourg City)
- Mémorial de la deportation (Luxembourg City)

== Mexico ==
- Memory and Tolerance Museum (Mexico City)

== Netherlands ==
=== Amsterdam ===
- The Anne Frank House, Amsterdam.
- The Auschwitz Monument by Jan Wolkers in the Wertheim Park, Amsterdam.
- The Dockworker Monument, Amsterdam.
- The Dutch National Holocaust Museum, Amsterdam.
- The Hollandsche Schouwburg (Amsterdam).
- The Homomonument, Amsterdam.
- The Joods Historisch Museum, Amsterdam.
- Joods Monument (translated name: Jewish Monument, a memorial website).
- National Holocaust Names Memorial (Holocaust Namenmonument) in Jodenbuurt neighborhood of Amsterdam

=== Utrecht and Vught ===
- Camp Vught National Memorial at Herzogenbusch concentration camp.
- Joods monument (translated name: Jewish Monument) displaying 1200 names near the Railway Museum (former Maliebaan Railway Station), Utrecht.

=== Westerbork ===
- The Westerbork camp and information centre (Westerbork).
- 102,000 Stones Monument (Dutch: De 102.000 stenen) at the former Westerbork transit camp (Dutch: Kamp Westerbork) in Hooghalen, Drenthe, with a stone without a name for each victim.

=== Amersfoort ===
- the polizeiliches durchgangslager Kamp Amersfoort located at the border between Amersfoort and Leusden

== New Zealand ==
- Holocaust Centre of New Zealand (HCNZ)
- Auckland War Memorial Museum

== North Macedonia ==
- Holocaust Memorial Center for the Jews of Macedonia (Skopje)

== Norway ==
- Center for Studies of Holocaust and Religious Minorities (Oslo)

== Philippines ==
- Philippine–Israel Friendship Park (Quezon City)

== Poland ==
- Auschwitz-Birkenau State Museum, (Oświęcim)
- The Oświęcim Synagogue (Oświęcim)
- Bełżec extermination camp (Bełżec)
- Ghetto Heroes Monument (Warsaw)
- POLIN Museum of the History of Polish Jews (Warsaw)
- Warsaw Ghetto Museum (Warsaw)
- Eagle Pharmacy (Kraków)
- Lublin Holocaust Memorial
- Radegast train station (Łódź)
- Survivors' Park, (Łódź)
- Treblinka extermination camp (Treblinka)
- Monument to the Memory of Children - Victims of the Holocaust
- Umschlagplatz Monument (Warsaw)
- Memorial in Palmiry
- Museum and Memorial in Sobibór

== Portugal ==
- Holocaust Museum of Porto

== Romania ==
- Holocaust Memorial, Bucharest
- Elie Wiesel Memorial House, Sighetu Marmației
- Memorial to the Victims of the 1941 Pogrom, Bucharest
- Holocaust Memorial, Târgu Mures
- Northern Transylvania Holocaust Memorial Museum, Şimleu Silvaniei.
- Memorial to the Deported Jews, Oradea

== Russia ==
- Holocaust Memorial Synagogue, Moscow.
- Russian Research and Educational Holocaust Center, Moscow.
- Formula of Sorrow monument, Pushkin, Saint Petersburg.
- Memorial plaque to Jewish deportees from Königsberg and East Prussia, Kaliningrad North Railway Station.
- Memorial to the Victims of Fascism, Krasnodar.
- Mass murder site monument, Lyubavichi.
- Ravine of Death memorial stone, Taganrog.
- Palmnicken massacre monument, Yantarny, Kaliningrad.
- Monument at Vostryakovo Jewish Cemetery, Moscow.
- Zmievskaya Balka memorial, Rostov-on-Don.

== Serbia ==
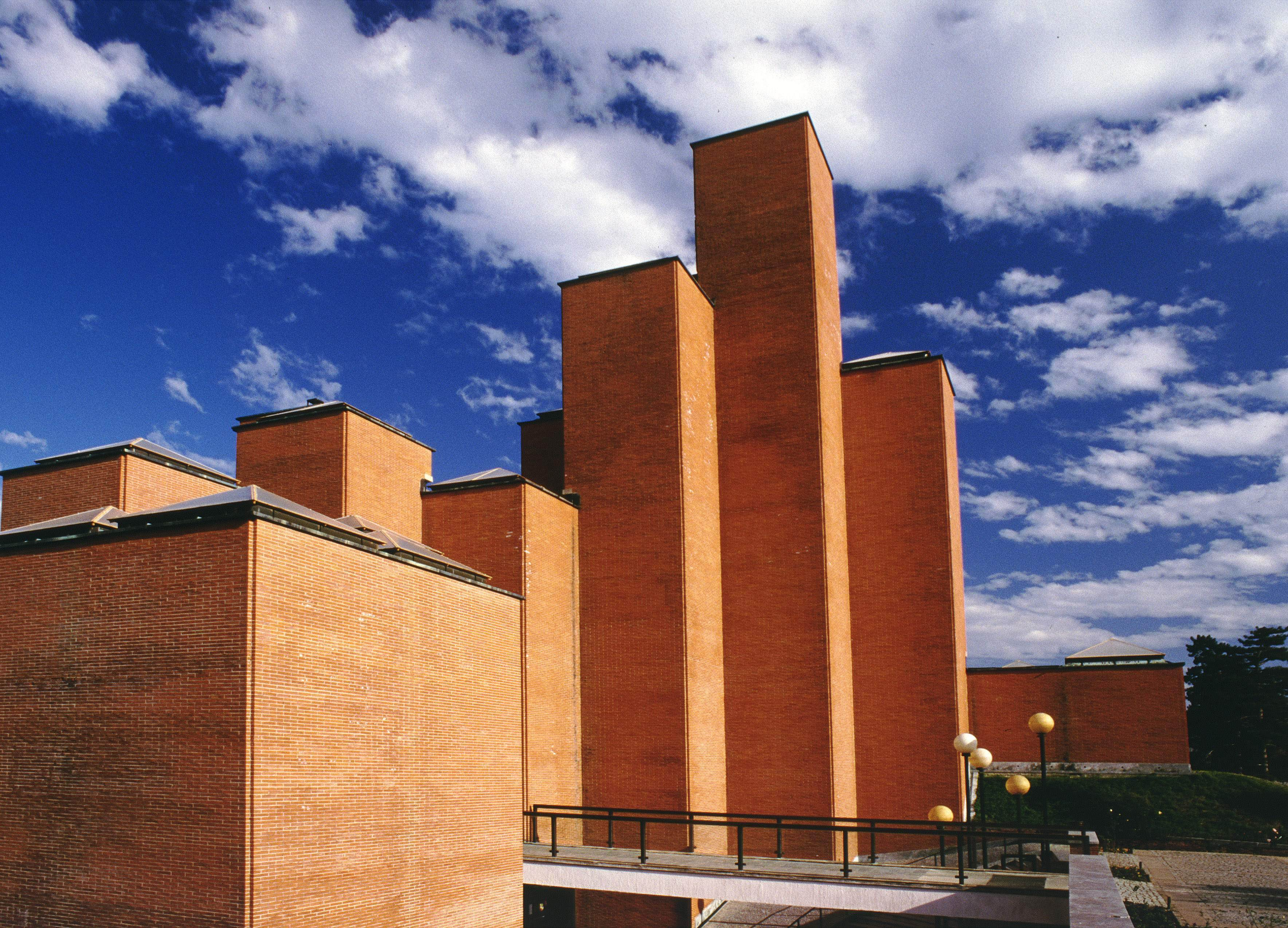
Šumarice Memorial Park, Kragujevac

- Menorah in Flames sculpture (Belgrade)
- Memorial Park Jajinci (Belgrade)
- Banjica concentration camp (Belgrade)
- Jewish Historical Museum (Belgrade)
- Belgrade Museum of Genocide Victims
- Miklós Radnóti memorial (Bor)
- Kladovo transport memorial
- Šumarice Genocide Memorial Park (Kragujevac)
- Monument to the victims of the Novi Sad raid
- Bubanj Memorial Park (Niš)
- Crveni Krst concentration camp (Niš)

== Slovakia ==
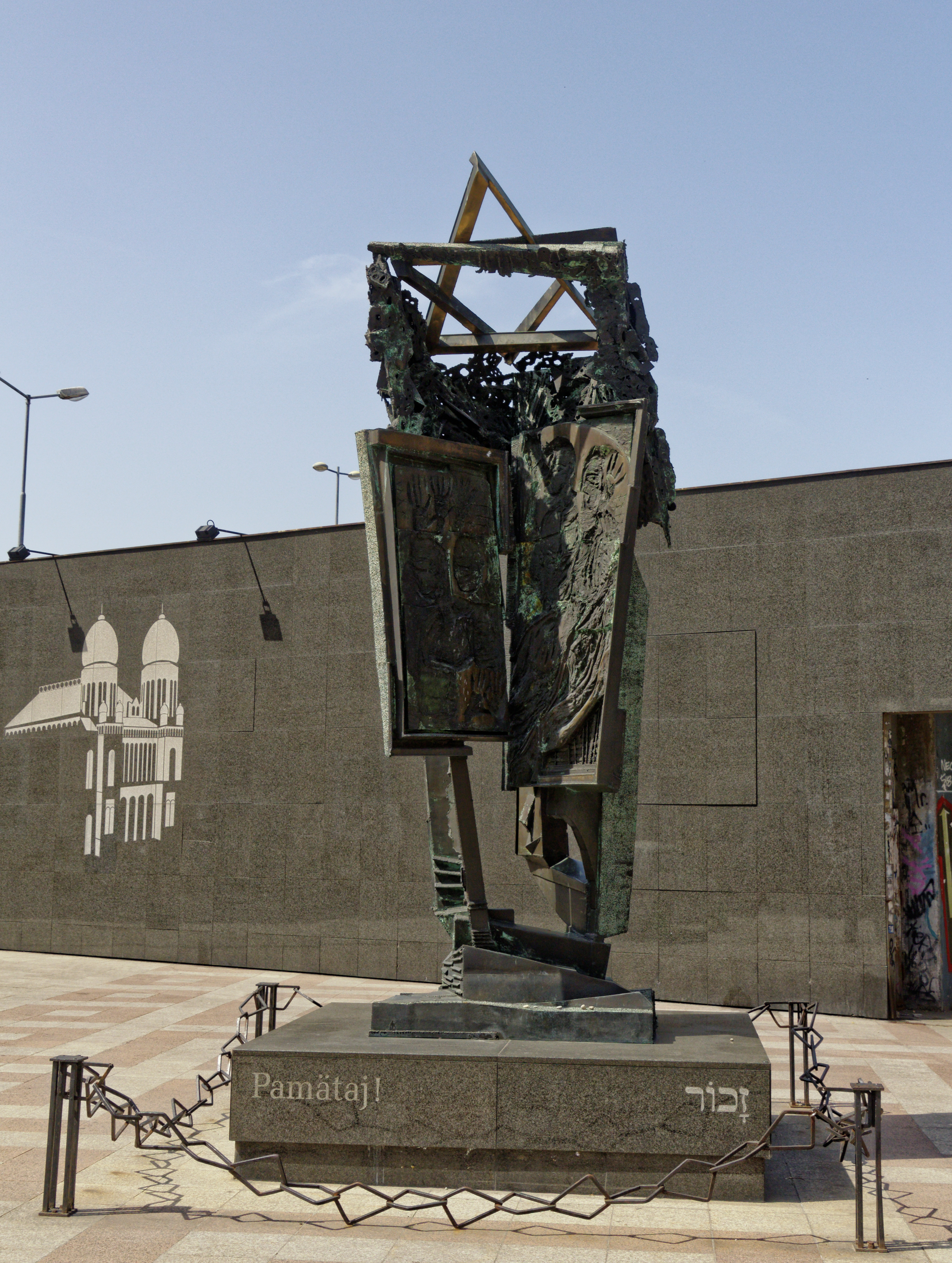
Holocaust and Demolished Synagogue Memorial, Rybné námestie in Bratislava

- Memorial at the Museum of the Slovak National Uprising (Banská Bystrica)
- Holocaust Memorial (Bratislava)
- Museum of Jewish Culture (Bratislava)
- Holocaust memorial for the Jewish inhabitants of Huncovce
- Holocaust memorial plaque on the synagogue of Košice
- Monument and Memorial to the Slovak National Uprising (Nemecká)
- Memorial to the Victims of the Nováky Forced Labor and Concentration Camp
- Memorial Plaque to the Deported Jews at Poprad Railway Station
- Holocaust Memorial at Prešov synagogue
- Holocaust memorial plaque Prešov town hall
- Sereď Holocaust Museum
- Park of Generous Souls

== Slovenia ==
- Loibl Süd Concentration Camp Memorial

== South Africa ==
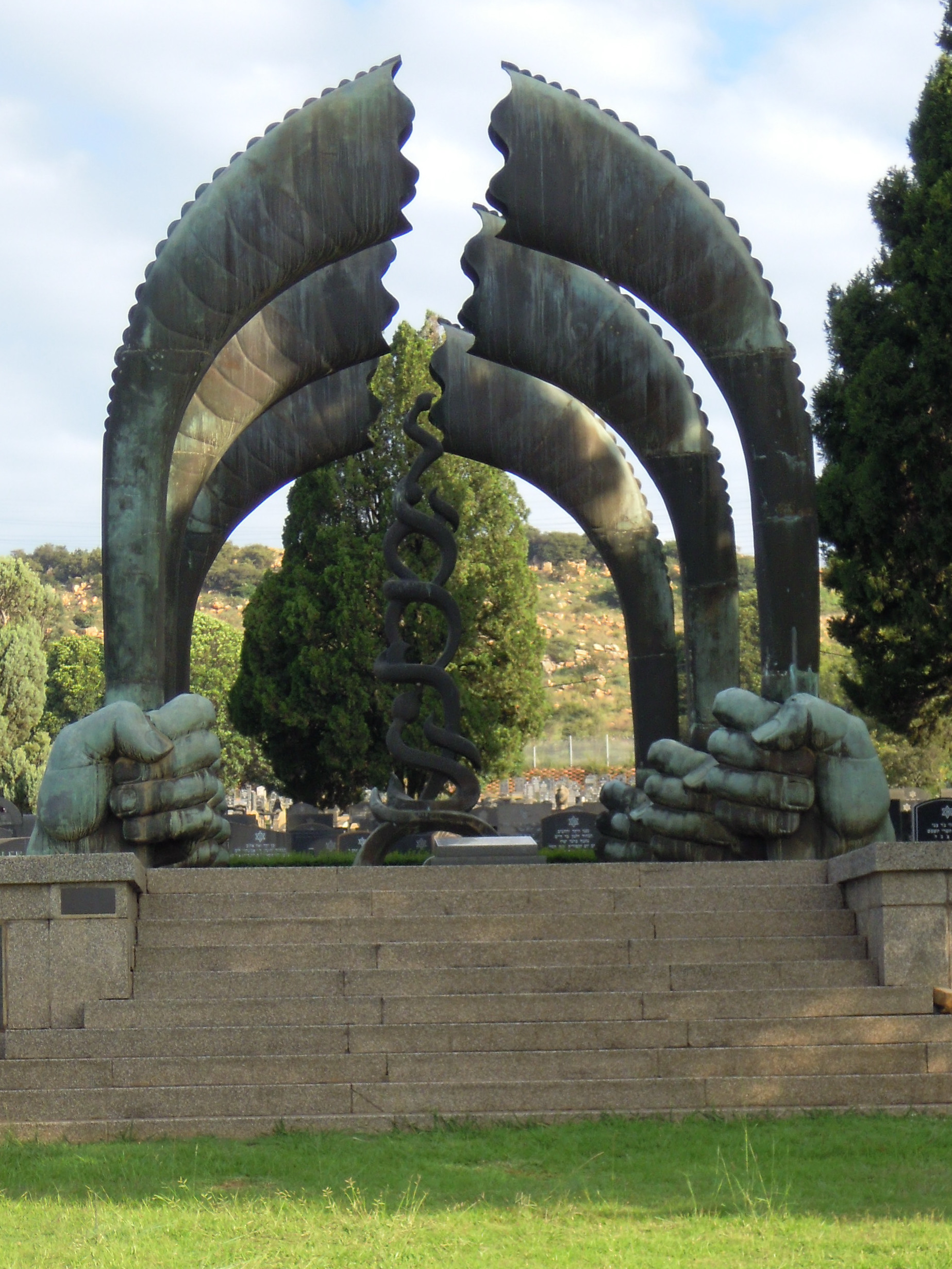
Memorial to the Six Million, Johannesburg

- The Cape Town Holocaust Centre (Cape Town)
- The Durban Holocaust Centre (Durban)
- The Johannesburg Holocaust and Genocide Centre (Johannesburg)
- Memorial to the Six Million at Westpark Cemetery (Johannesburg)

== Spain ==
- Monument to the Victims of the Holocaust (Madrid)
- Monument to the Victims of the Mauthausen Concentration Camp (Almería)

== Suriname ==
- Paramaribo Holocaust Memorial Paramaribo

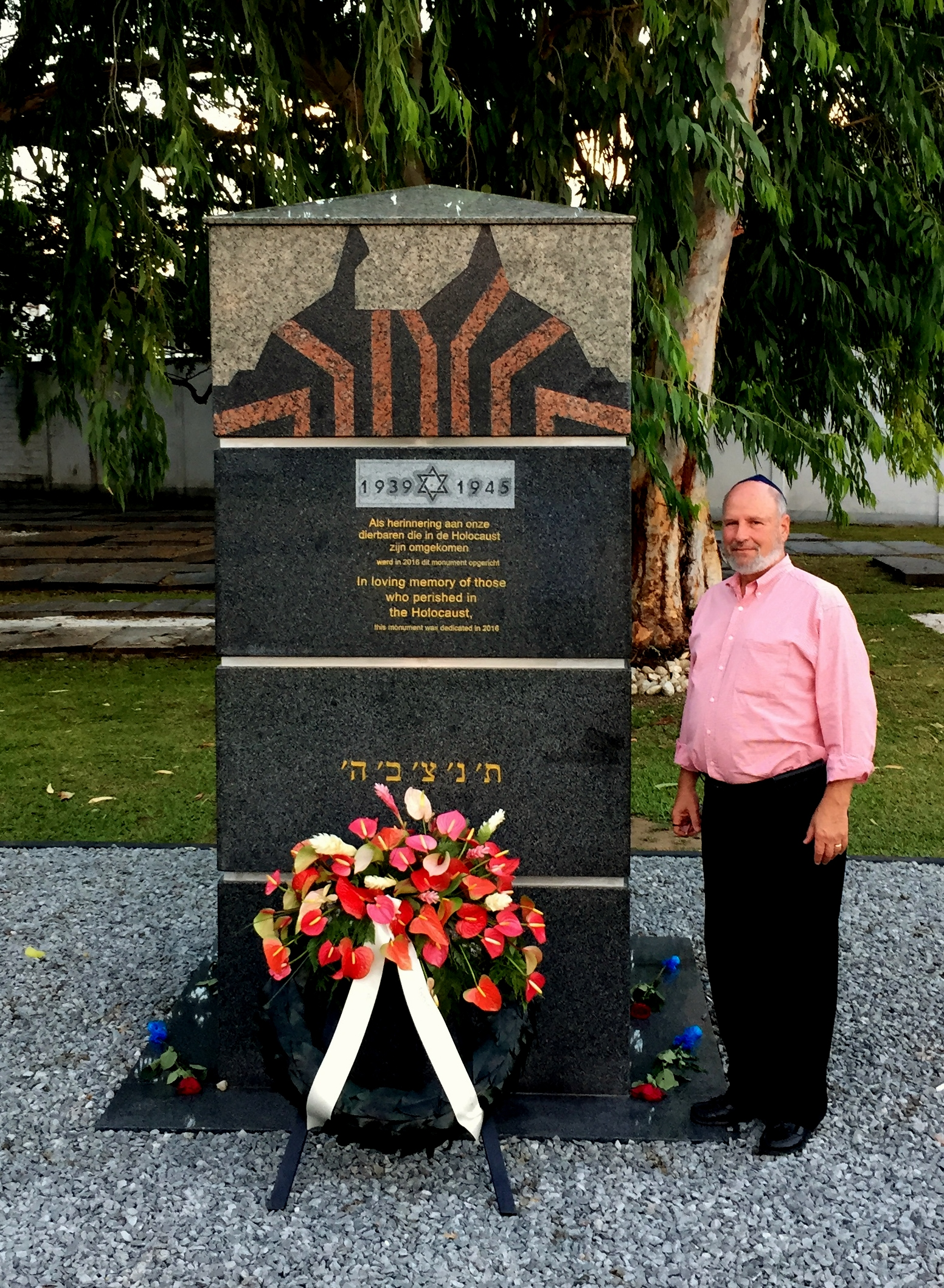
Holocaust Memorial Paramaribo, Suriname

== Sweden ==
- Swedish Holocaust Museum (Stockholm)
- Monument to the Memory of the Holocaust Victims at the Great Synagogue of Stockholm (Stockholm)
- Storsjöteatern theatre (Östersund)

== Taiwan ==
- Holocaust Museum, Taiwan.

== Ukraine ==
- "Wailing Wall" for the murdered Jews of Bakhmut
- Memorial to the murdered Jews of Chernihiv
- Memorial to the Roma murdered in the Podusovka forest, near Chernihiv
- Babi Yar Holocaust Memorial Center, Kyiv
- Memorial to the murdered Jews of Kovel at the Bakhiv forest mass murder site.
- Memorial to the murdered Jews of Kysylyn at the mass grave site
- Memorials to the murdered Jews of Lutsk
- Memorial to the murdered Jews of Mariupol
- Memorial to the Jews of Mukachevo
- Holocaust Museum in Odesa
- Memorial to the murdered Jews of Ostrozhets
- Memorial to the murdered Jews of Pryluky
- Memorial to the murdered Jews of Ratne at the mass graves site
- Memorial site for the murdered Jews of Ostrozhets
- Memorial to the murdered Jews of Rava-Ruska
- Memorial to the Murdered Jews of Zhytomyr

== United Kingdom ==
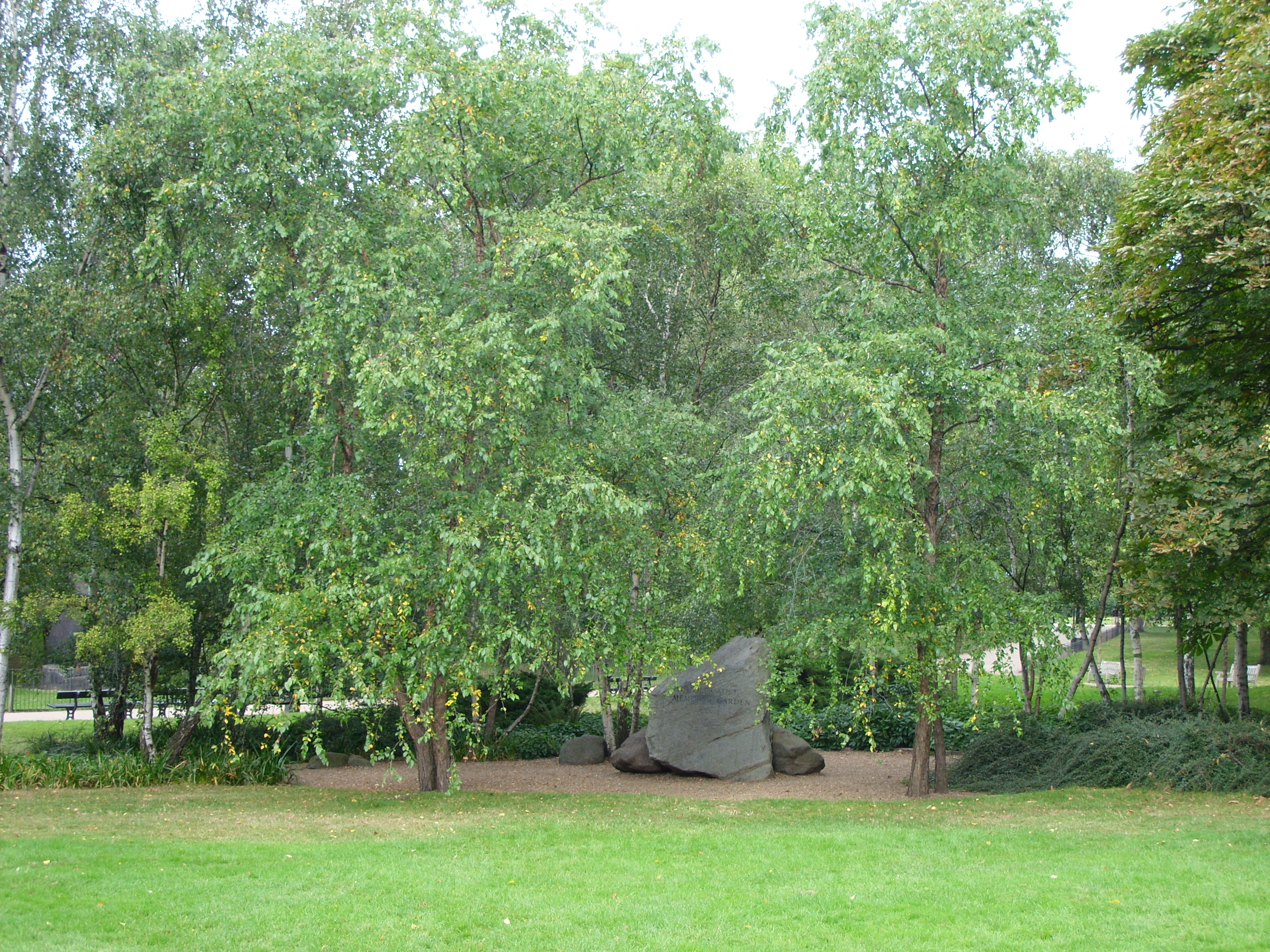
Holocaust Memorial in Hyde Park, London

- Beth Shalom Holocaust Centre (National Holocaust Centre and Museum), Nottinghamshire
- Plaque in the churchyard of the Church of St Michael the Greater, Stamford, Lincolnshire
- Holocaust Centre North, at the University of Huddersfield
- Hyde Park Holocaust Memorial, Hyde Park, London
- Kindertransport – The Arrival, Liverpool Street Station, London
- Kindertransport statue, Harwich
- Holocaust Exhibition, Imperial War Museum, London
- Wiener Library for the Study of the Holocaust and Genocide, London
- (Proposed) UK Holocaust Memorial, London

== Uruguay ==
- Memorial del Holocausto del Pueblo Judío (Montevideo)

== Uzbekistan ==
Victory Park, [Tashkent] monument unveiled in May 2022 to honour Uzbeks who assisted Jewish refugees during World War II. It is sculpted by Victory Park. It was created by Uzbeki [Marina Borodina].

The monument is located in the city's Victory Park

== See also ==
- Association of Holocaust Organizations
- Culture of Remembrance – Interaction of a group with their past
- Holocaust museum (disambiguation)
- Holocaust victims
- List of Armenian genocide memorials – Armenian genocide memorials
- List of Holodomor memorials and museums – For the great famine of 1932/33 in the Soviet Ukraine
- List of Jewish museums
