= DenkOrt Deportationen 1941–1944 =

Holocaust memorial

- Established: < 17 June 2020
- Location: 97080 Würzburg, Germany
- Coordinates: 49.8006°N 9.9360°E
- Chairpersons: Benita Stolz; 1. Vorsitzende und Koordination
- Website: denkort-deportationen.de

DenkOrt Deportationen 1941–1944 is a Holocaust memorial in Würzburg, Germany, commemorating the deportation of Jews from Würzburg and from the 109 surrounding communities in Lower Franconia where Jews once lived.

Dedicated on 17 June 2020, the sculptural installation, located in front of Würzburg Hauptbahnhof (the central train station), is composed of stylized suitcases, rucksacks, bundles, and blanket rolls, all crafted from locally sourced stone, wood, or metal and mounted on low plinths. The abandoned luggage symbolizes the loss and disappearance of Jews under the Nazis. Efforts to create the memorial were led by Benita Stolz, who served on Würzburg's City Council 1990-2020, together with Dr. Josef Schuster, a physician and president since 2014 of the Central Council of Jews in Germany (Zentralrat der Juden in Deutschland), and a past president of the Jewish Community in Würzburg. Local historians and community representatives also participated in planning the memorial, designed by artist Matthias Braun.

The deportations on Holocaust trains from Würzburg and a nearby freight station were part of the Nazi regime's "Final Solution." Between 1941 and 1944, some 2,069 Jews were deported. Didactic panels, illustrated with archival photographs of deportees and their belongings, provide information about the deportations. Each piece of luggage has a "twin" that is to be installed in one of the surrounding towns as a further extension of the memorial, and QR codes attached to the luggage take visitors to a website to learn about the Jewish population and history of each town.

DenkOrt Deportationen 1941–1944 has become a gathering place for Holocaust remembrance events, such as the anniversary of the first Würzburg deportations on 27 November 1941. It has also been targeted by vandals.
