= Museum of the Holocaust (Guatemala) =

The Museum of the Holocaust - Museo del Holocausto in Guatemala city is the first museum of the Holocaust in Central America.

The museum opened in 2016. It currently has a temporary exhibition about the Holocaust by bullets perpetrated by the Einsatzgruppen. The exhibition is presented by the organization Yahad-In Unum.

== Mission ==
The museum is aiming to educate new generations about the genocide perpetrated against the Jews, the mass executions and persecutions against the Roma as well as other victims of the Second World War.

== See also ==
- List of Holocaust memorials and museums
