= Nordenstadt Memorial =

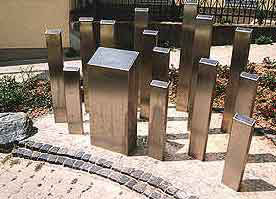
Nordenstadt Memorial

The Nordenstadt Memorial (Gedenkstätte Nordenstadt) is a memorial to the Nordenstadt Jews murdered in the Holocaust. It was inaugurated in 1994 in front of the former town hall. This is the place from which the deportation of the Jews from Nordenstadt took place. On the green space on the corner of Heerstraße and Stolberger Strasse, the artist Marc van den Broek designed 15 metal steles of different heights. 14 of these carry the handwritten names of the victims of the Holocaust on a brass plate. One of the stele bears the inscription: "Am 10. Juni und am 28. August 1942 wurden die Nordenstadter Juden von hier in die Vernichtungslager deportiert. Wehret den Anfängen!" ("On 10 June and on 28 August 1942, the Jews from Nordenstadt were deported from here to the extermination camps. Resist the beginnings!")
