= Hailfingen-Tailfingen Concentration Camp Memorial =

Memorial in Germany

Coordinates: 48.53744°N 8.85590°E

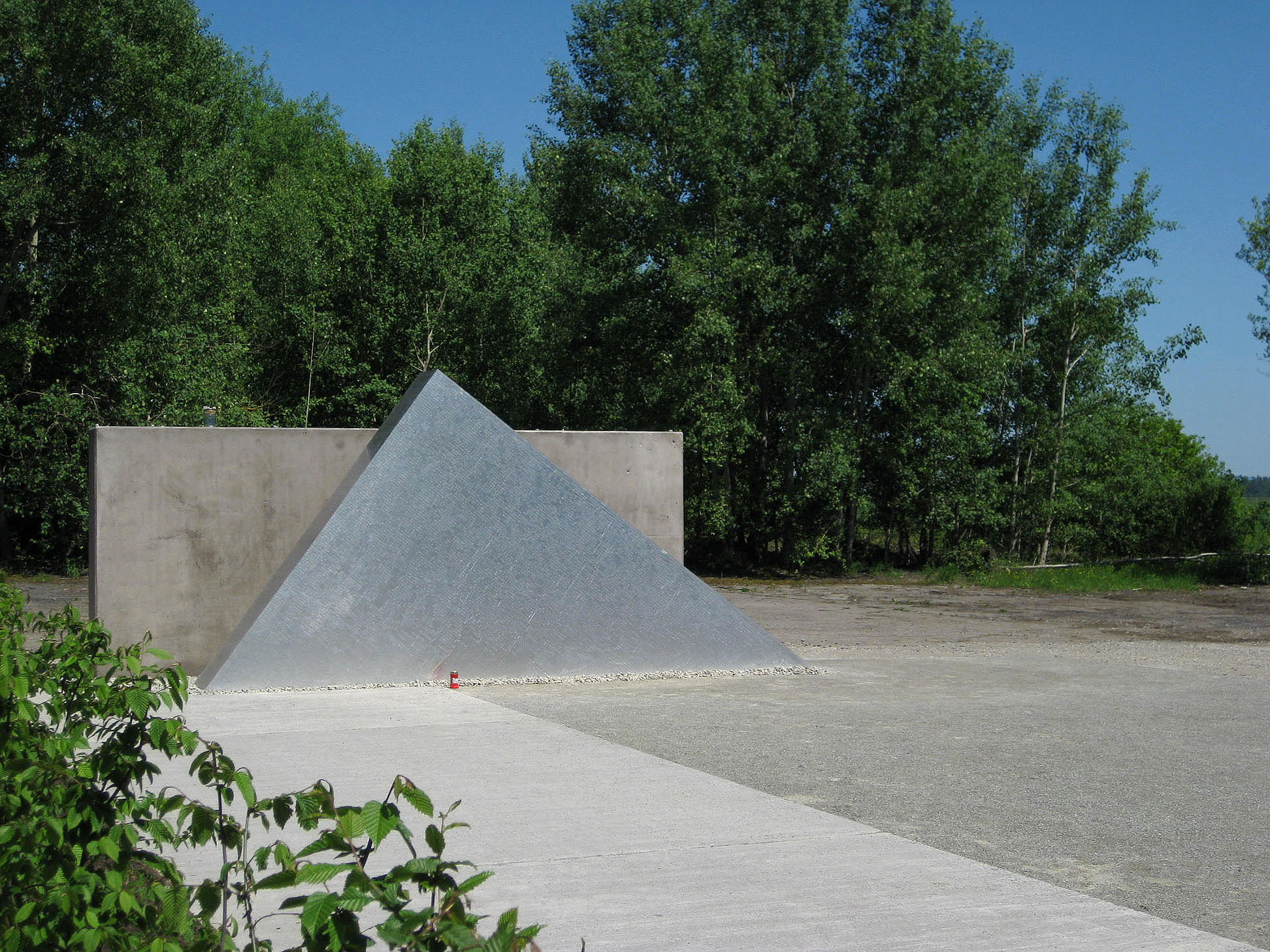
Hailfingen-Tailfingen Concentration Camp Memorial

The Hailfingen-Tailfingen Concentration Camp Memorial is a joint project of two communities in Germany: the Rottenburg am Neckar district of Hailfingen and the Gäufelden district of Tailfingen, both in the state of Baden-Württemberg.

== History ==
A temporary stone erected to memorialize the Hailfingen-Tailfingen Nazi concentration camp was desecrated in 1985. By 2010, the necessary conditions had been met for a multi-part concentration camp memorial to be built.

== Description ==
=== Memorial ===
At the western end of the former military airfield, the sculptor Rudolf Kurz created a 2.5 metres (8.2 ft) high and 5 metres (16 ft) wide uneven triangle standing in front of a 5 metres (16 ft) long and 2 metres (6.6 ft) high wall of untreated concrete. The names of all the 601 concentration camp prisoners, survivors and perished, are engraved on i.

=== Exhibition and documentation centre in Tailfingen town hall ===
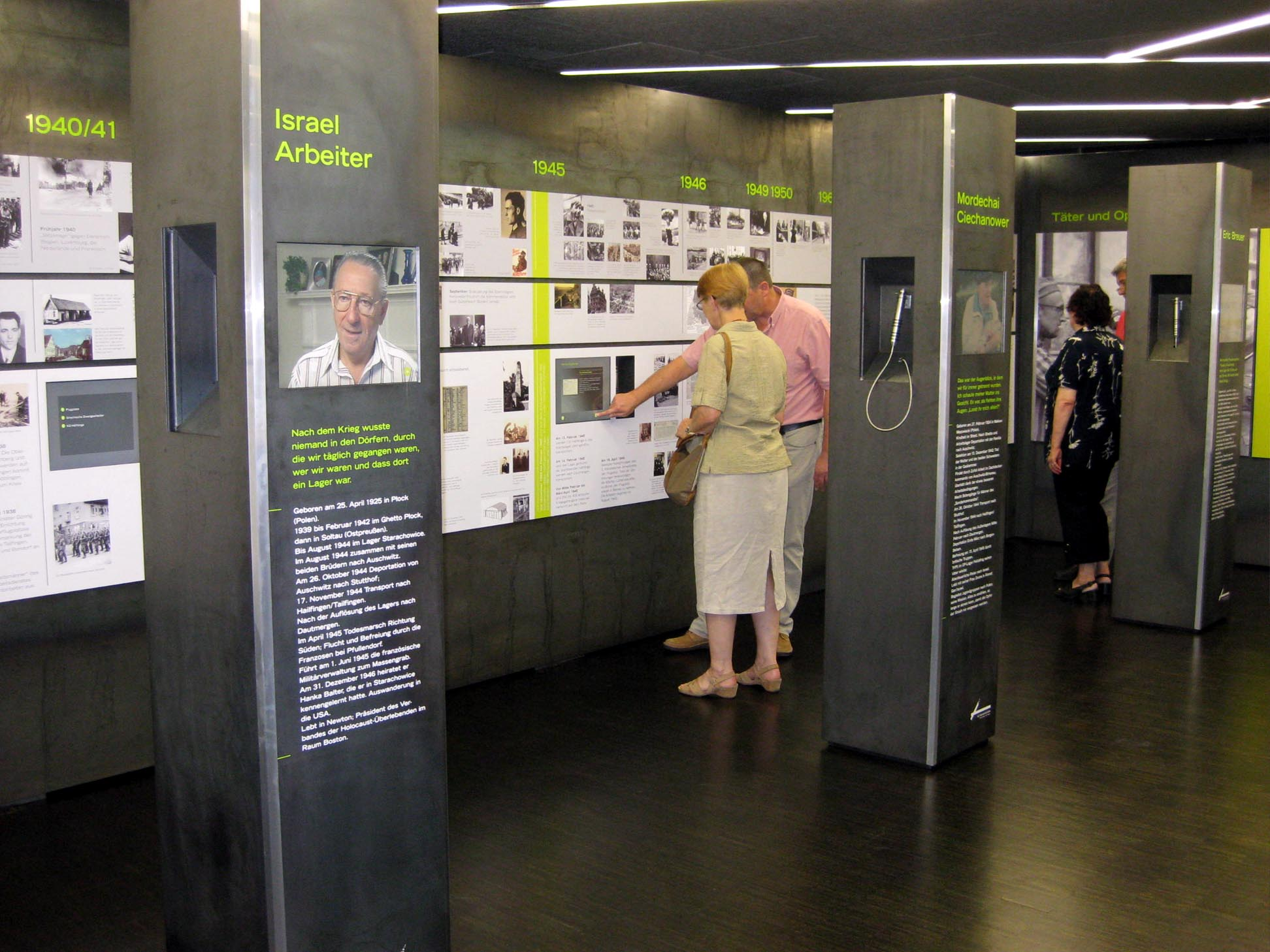
Exhibition and documentation room in Tailfingen town hall

The ground floor of the Tailfingen town hall contains a multimedia exhibition space that documents the former airfield and Hailfingen/Tailfingen concentration camp. The "Number Book" lists the names of all Jewish prisoners.

=== Cemetery in Tailfingen ===
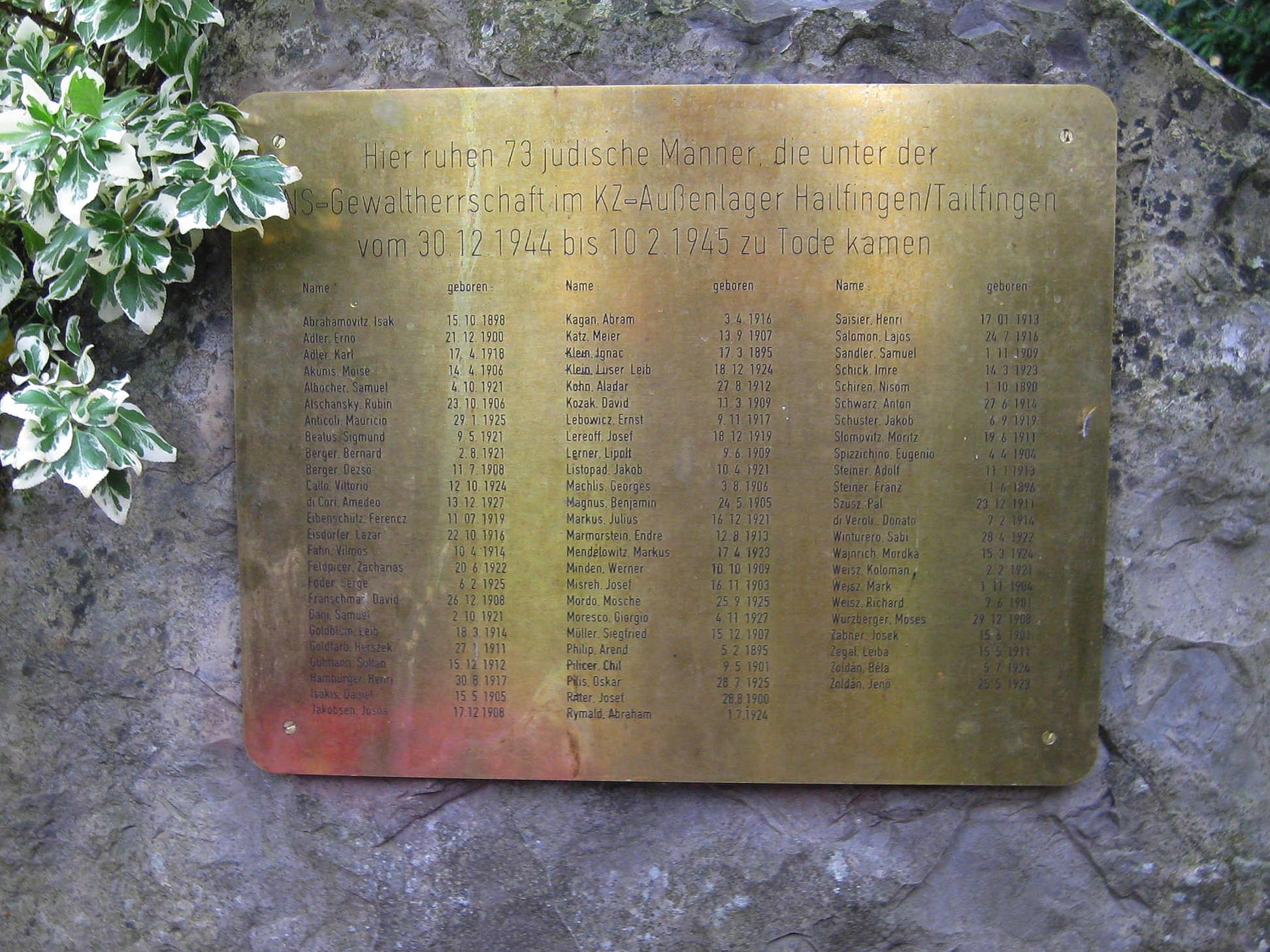
Memorial plaque at Tailfingen cemetery

In June 1945, bodies were exhumed from the mass grave at the concentration camp and buried in the Tailfingen cemetery. The following was engraved on a wooden cross: "72 unknown concentration camp prisoners rest here". In 1986, commemorative plaques were erected at the Tailfingen cemetery. As part of the memorial, a plaque with the names of the buried was erected in 2010.

== Memorial site associations ==
The memorial is a member of the Gäu-Neckar-Alb Memorials Network and the Natzweiler Memorials Network in the former concentration camp complex.
