= Memorial to the Jews of Zelem =

Holocaust memorial

Coordinates: 47°35′57″N 16°37′33″E

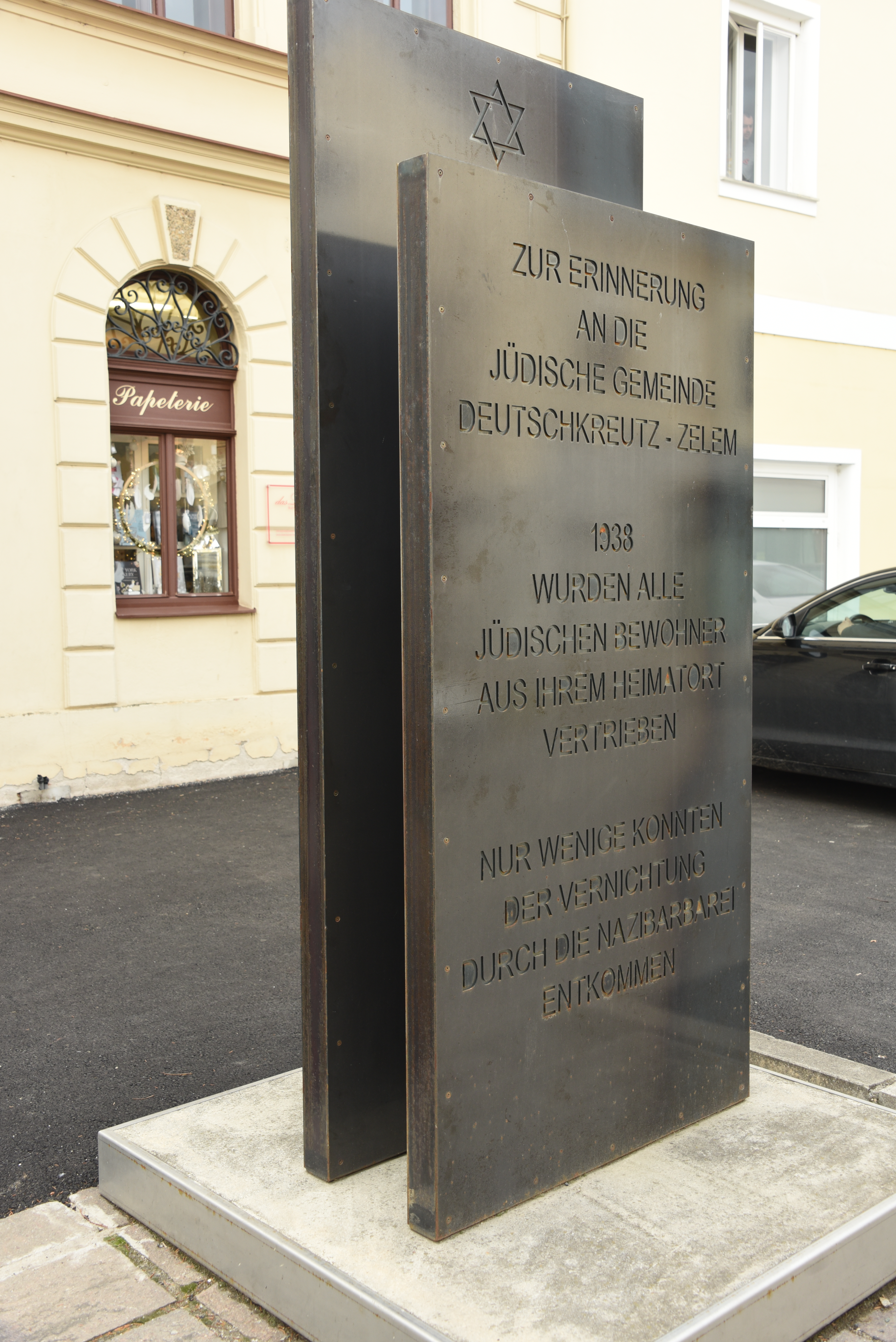
Memorial to the Jews of Zelem

The Memorial to the Jews of Zelem (German: Denkmal für die Juden von Zelem) commemorates the Jewish community in the Austrian market town of Deutschkreutz in Burgenland, which was expelled in 1938. It was erected and unveiled in 2012 and is located in front of the former residence of the composer Karl Goldmark. The memorial was initiated by Michael Feyer.

== History of the Jews of Zelem ==
Deutschkreutz was called Zelem (also Zehlem) by Jews because the place name contains the term cross – a term which in the perception of Jews stands for the brutal oppression in the Roman Empire and the bloody crusades of the Roman Catholic Church and which devout Talmud following Jews were not allowed to say. Zelem was once the largest Jewish community in Burgenland and from 1676 it was one of the seven communities under the protection of the House of Esterházy.

The regional historian Adalbert Putz writes that from the 14th century onwards, Jews may have lived and acquired property in many communities in present-day Burgenland Expulsions from Carinthia and Styria, but also expulsions from Vienna, Lower Austria and Moravia led to a steady increase in the members of the seven Jewish communities in Burgenland. On 26 March 1720, Michael I. Esterházy de Galantha issued a letter of protection to the Jews of Zelem confirming their right to settle and their status as Schutzjude. Two major fires in 1762 and 1777 hit the community hard. In 1857, 1,244 Jews lived in Deutschkreutz, which represented 37.8% of the total population. This was the peak of the community. After that, a gradual migration to the conurbations of Vienna, Wiener Neustadt and Ödenburg began, as Jews were allowed to settle in the cities from 1860 onwards and were granted emancipation in 1867 as part of the Austro-Hungarian Compromise. The emigration process only slowed down in the 1920s, after the area had fallen to the Republic of Austria.

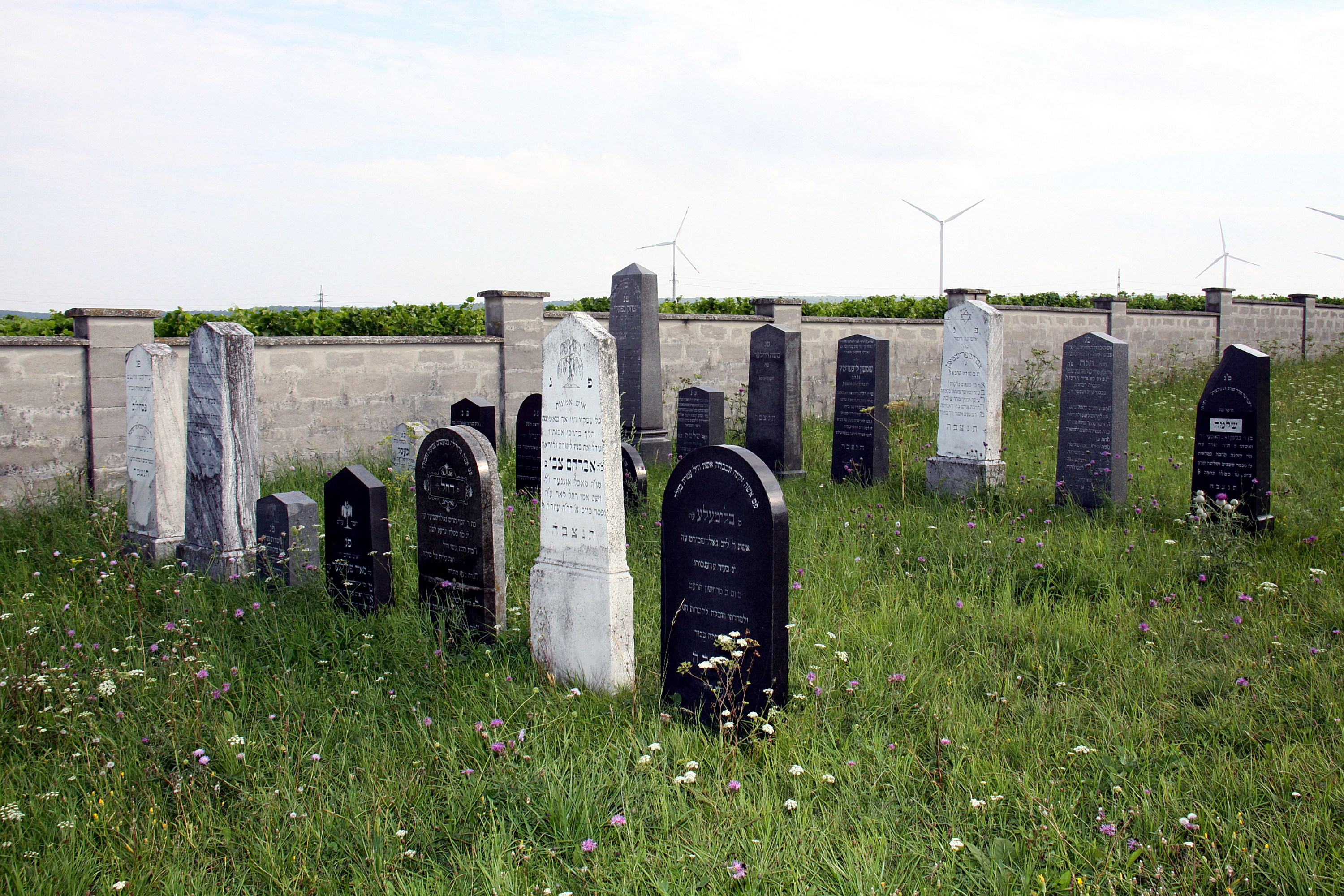
Relics of the Jewish cemetery of the municipality of Zelem

A new, larger synagogue was built in 1834. The community also had its own cemetery and a Yeshiva, a Torah Talmud school, which was run by the rabbi, was highly respected and attracted a number of young men from neighbouring countries. In 1880, however, the congregation numbered only 476 Jews. Immediately after the annexation of Austria in March 1938, a particularly brutal persecution of Jews began in Burgenland; by October there were no longer any Jewish communities. A detention camp was set up in Frauenkirchen, where Jews and exponents of the Fatherland Front were imprisoned. 154 members of the congregation were able to flee in time, 81 were demonstrably murdered in a concentration camp. To this day it is still not known where many of them have gone. On Sunday 16 February 1941 the synagogue was blown up by the Nazis, and a 17-year-old observer was fatally hit by a stray brick. Prior to this the valuable Torah curtain of the temple had been confiscated and brought to Vienna. The cemetery was desecrated.

Today a plaque in the Jewish cemetery commemorates a second Jewish tragedy on Deutschkreutz soil. There is a mass grave of 284 Budapest Jews who died of hunger, exhaustion and illness in 1944 in the grounds of Deutschkreutz Castle and were then hastily buried.

== Construction and unveiling of the monument ==
The house in which Karl Goldmark (1830-1915), who later became a composer, spent ten years of his childhood and youth is one of the last remaining Jewish houses in Zelem. It is located in the former Judengasse, today's Hauptstraße. The monument commemorating the community, which is rich in tradition, was placed in front of the building.

The memorial was initiated by the owner of a Viennese event agency, Kommerzialrat Michael Feyer and could be unveiled on 3 July 2012 during a festive ceremony, which numerous members of the Jewish Community of Vienna and people interested in contemporary history attended despite the rain. Prior to this, the Jewish cemetery had been visited, where the local history expert Adalbert Putz gave an introduction to the history of the Jewish community.

== Inscription ==
IN REMEMBRANCE

OF THE

JEWISH COMMUNITY

DEUTSCHKREUTZ - ZELEM

1938

ALL JEWISH RESIDENTS

WERE EXPELLED

FROM THEIR HOMETOWN

ONLY A FEW COULD ESCAPE

THE DESTRUCTION

OF THE NAZI BARBARISM
