= Learning and memorial site Charlotte Taitl House =

Holocaust museum in Ried im Innkreis, Austria

Coordinates: 48°12′38″N 13°29′17″E

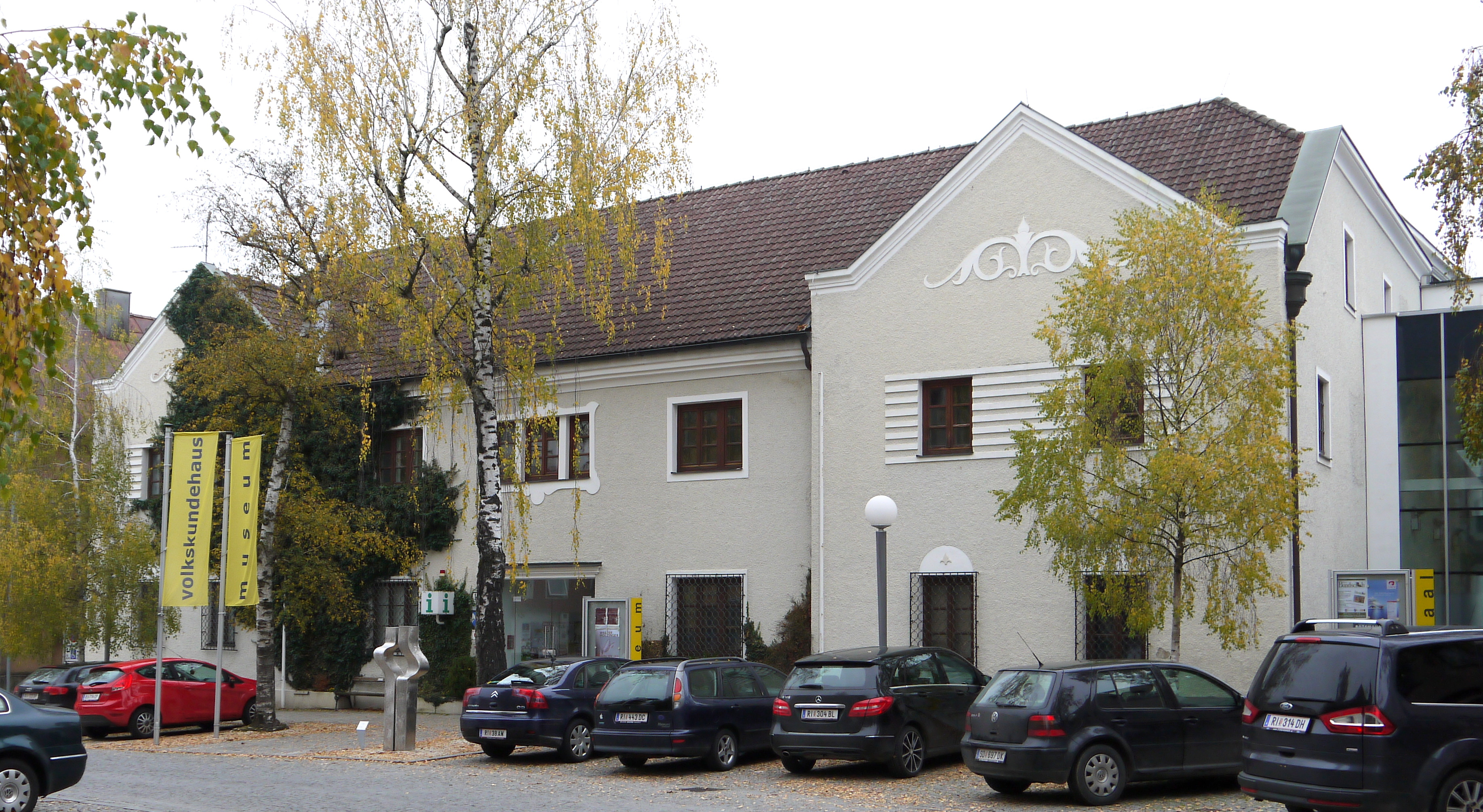
Innviertler Volkskundehaus museum

The Learning and memorial site Charlotte Taitl House (German: Lern- und Gedenkort Charlotte-Taitl-Haus) in Ried im Innkreis, Austria is dedicated to the victims of National Socialism and fascism in the district of Ried im Innkreis. It is an extension of the historical exhibition of the Innviertler Volkskundehaus museum. The initiative for this project came from the ARGE Lern- und Gedenkort. The building blocks formed the publication "Nationalsozialismus im Bezirk Ried im Innkreis. Resistance and Persecution 1938-1945" by Gottfried Gansinger, which was supplemented by research from ARGE members. In May 2015, the house of Roßmarkt No. 29 was solemnly named "Charlotte Taitl House". In May 2017 the ceremonial opening of the learning and memorial place took place.

Charlotte Taitl (born May 15, 1896 in Thomasroith/Ottnang - died October 16, 1944 Auschwitz) is one of 196 known victims of National Socialism and fascism in the district of Ried. The goal was to give back their names to the victims and therefore save them from oblivion.

The data and life stories of 26 victims are told on biography steles in the surrounding area. In an infobox at the end of the room, all information about National Socialism and the district of Ried in the time before and after is displayed. Further in-depth information can be accessed via a touch screen, and there is also a workstation with PC and Internet access for research work.

The Charlotte Taitl House, a place of learning and remembrance, is an inclusive exhibition with equal access to information for all. Oral history interviews, historical audio documents, sign language, and QR-code accessible easy-to-read texts are used to implement new technologies for information retrieval.

The Charlotte Taitl House, a place of learning and remembrance, is adjacent to the Stadtbücherei (municipal library), through which the exhibition can be accessed free of charge during its opening hours. In the area of the passage, black metal panels with the birth and death dates of the victims guide the visitors to the entrance. The space itself opens up through remembrance and is designed as a "white cube" to offer space for remembering, commemoration and reflection.
