= Formula of Sorrow =

- Формула скорби (Russian)
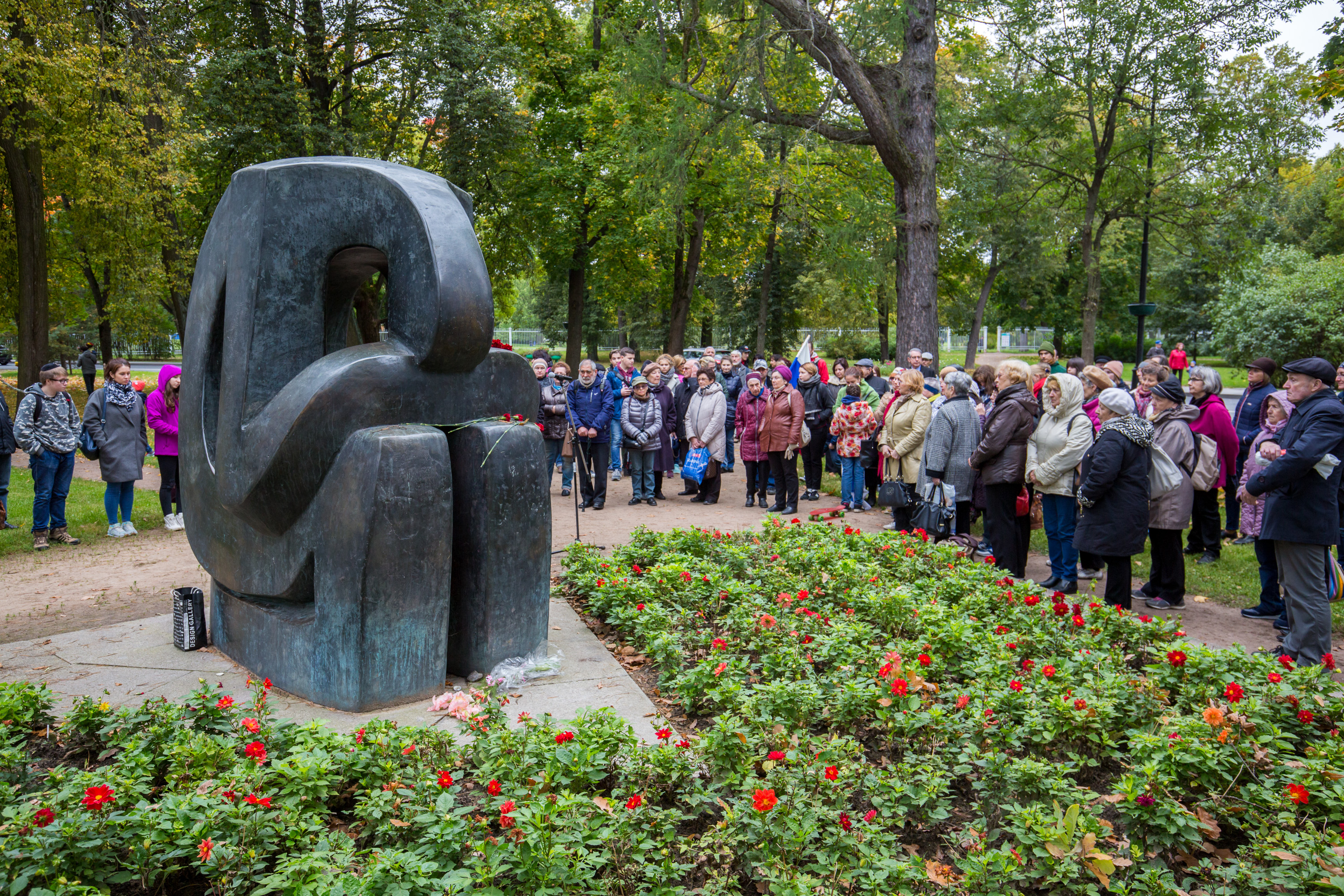

- Location in Saint Petersburg Location in Russia
- Artist: Vadim Sidur
- Completion date: October 13, 1991
- Medium: Bronze, granite
- Movement: Underground, abstract art, avant-garde
- Dimensions: 240 cm (94 in)
- Location: Puschkin, Saint Petersburg; 59.72208°N 30.39706°E

The Formula of Sorrow is a monument to Jewish victims of Nazism, killed in 1941 in the city of Puschkin during the World War II. The memorial is located in the park at the intersection of Dvortsovaya and Moskovskaya streets, not far from the Alexander Palace, near which mass executions took place. In total, about 3,600 Jews were killed in the Nazi-occupied Leningrad Oblast, of which about 250-300 were in Pushkin. During the Soviet era, the Holocaust was hushed up by the authorities. It was not until the 1980s that a group of Jewish activists began to investigate the history of the genocide of Jews near Leningrad (Saint Petersburg). On October 13, 1991, on their initiative, a monument to Jewish victims of Nazism was opened. The central part of the memorial was a sculpture by the cult underground Soviet artist Vadim Sidur "The Formula of Sorrow". The architectural design of the monument was created by Boris Bader. The memorial slab, made as a projection of the Star of David, contains a quotation from the Psalms in Hebrew and Russian, as well as an inscription dedicated to the murdered Jews.
