= Eckerwald Memorial =

Coordinates: 48°10′47.3″N 8°43′14.1″E

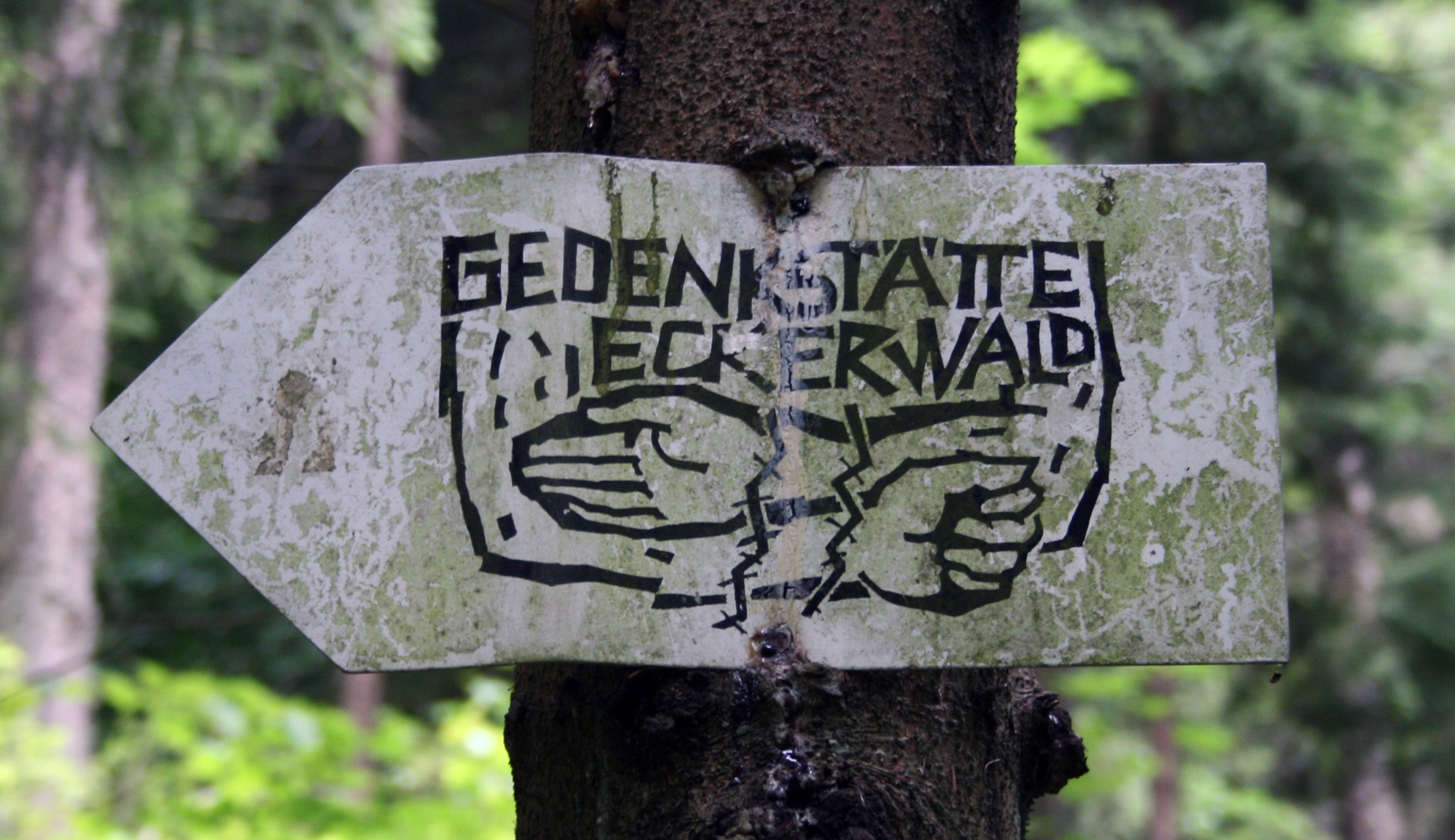
Information sign of the Memorial path Eckerwald

The Eckerwald Memorial (approx. 15km southwest of Balingen) commemorates one of the last murderous chapters of Nazi war politics. In the autumn of 1944, prisoners of the Schörzingen concentration camp built a shale oil factory on this site during a construction period of about three months.

The Memorial is located outside the village of Schörzingen, today a district of Schömberg in the Zollernalbkreis in Baden-Württemberg, at the foot of the Nordtrauf in the Swabian Alb.

The plant was one of ten production sites of the Company Wüste, the code name of an industrial complex consisting of concentration camps and industrial plants of the Nazis, in order to extract the increasingly scarce fuel from domestic oil shale towards the end of the Second World War. Under partly murderous conditions, concentration camp prisoners had to set up various oil shale plants from seven subcamps of the Natzweiler-Struthof concentration camp for experimental purposes and for the production of shale oil in order to work in them subsequently.

On the grounds of the Memorial site, a bronze sculpture in a trough excavated by prisoners commemorates the events.

The Memorial is a member of the Gäu-Neckar-Alb Memorials Network and the Natzweiler Memorials Network in the former concentration camp complex.

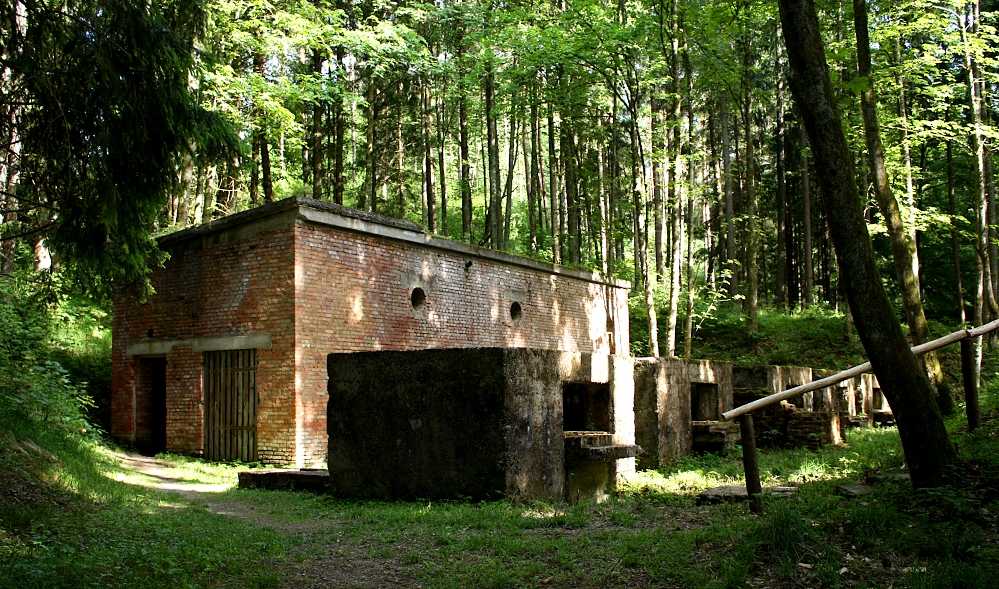
Eckerwald Memorial Site (Swabian Alb, near Schömberg); one memorial place of the Operation 'Wüste' (desert)

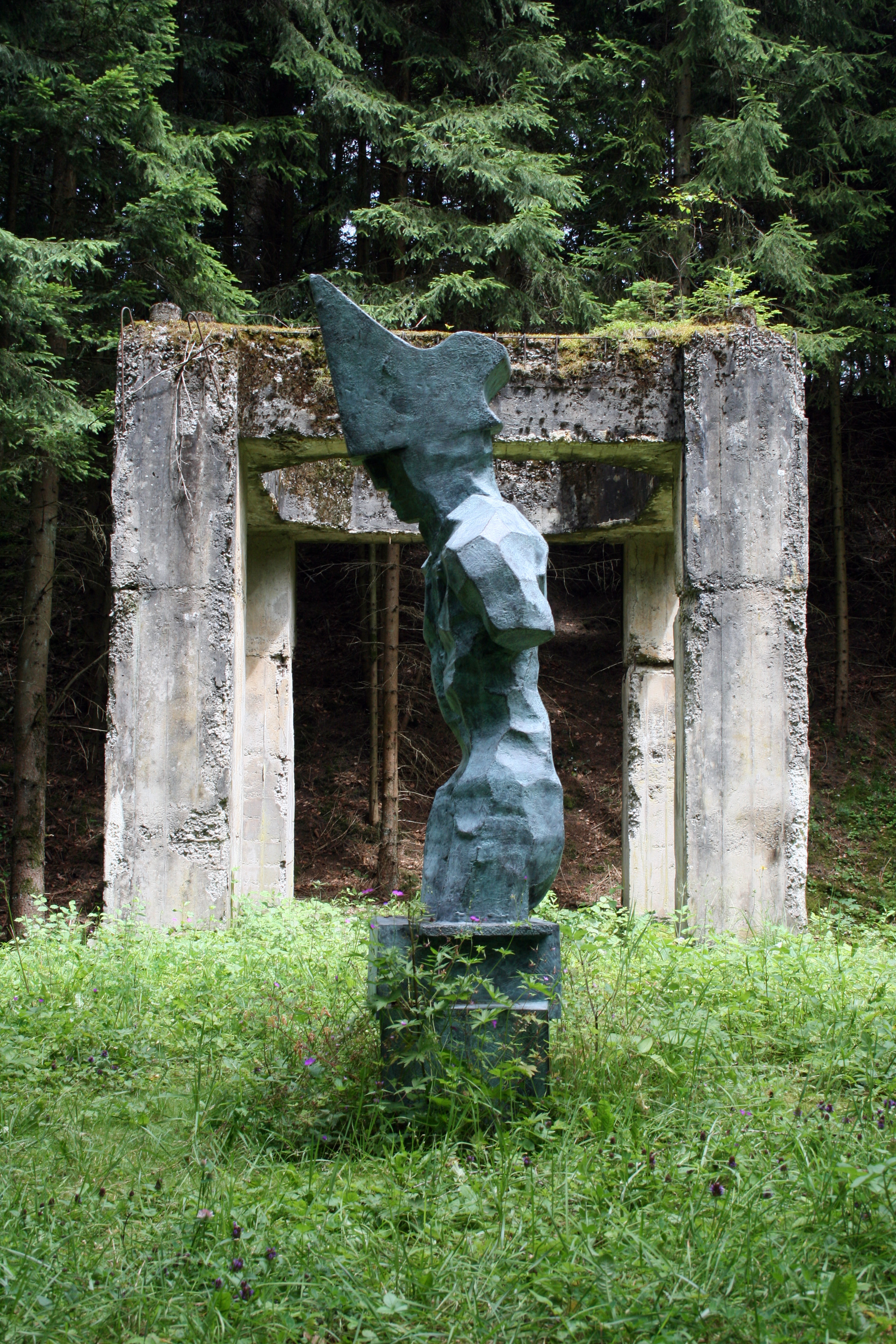
Eckerwald Memorial Site: bronze statue of the artist Siegfried Haas with the inscription: Macht ist Ohnmacht ("power is insensibility"). Deployed in summer 2004.

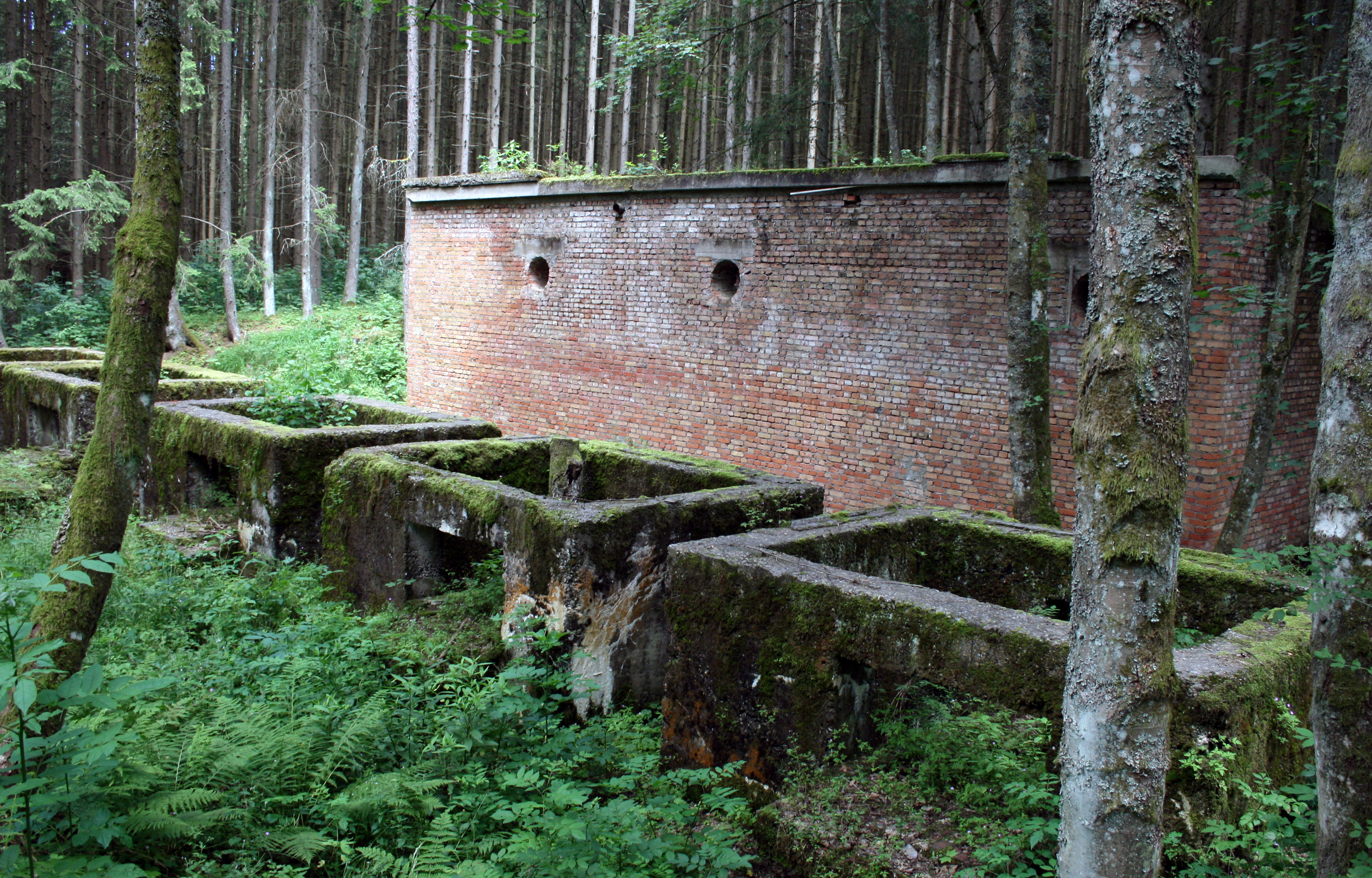
Eckerwald Memorial Site: ruins of the gas purification base construction

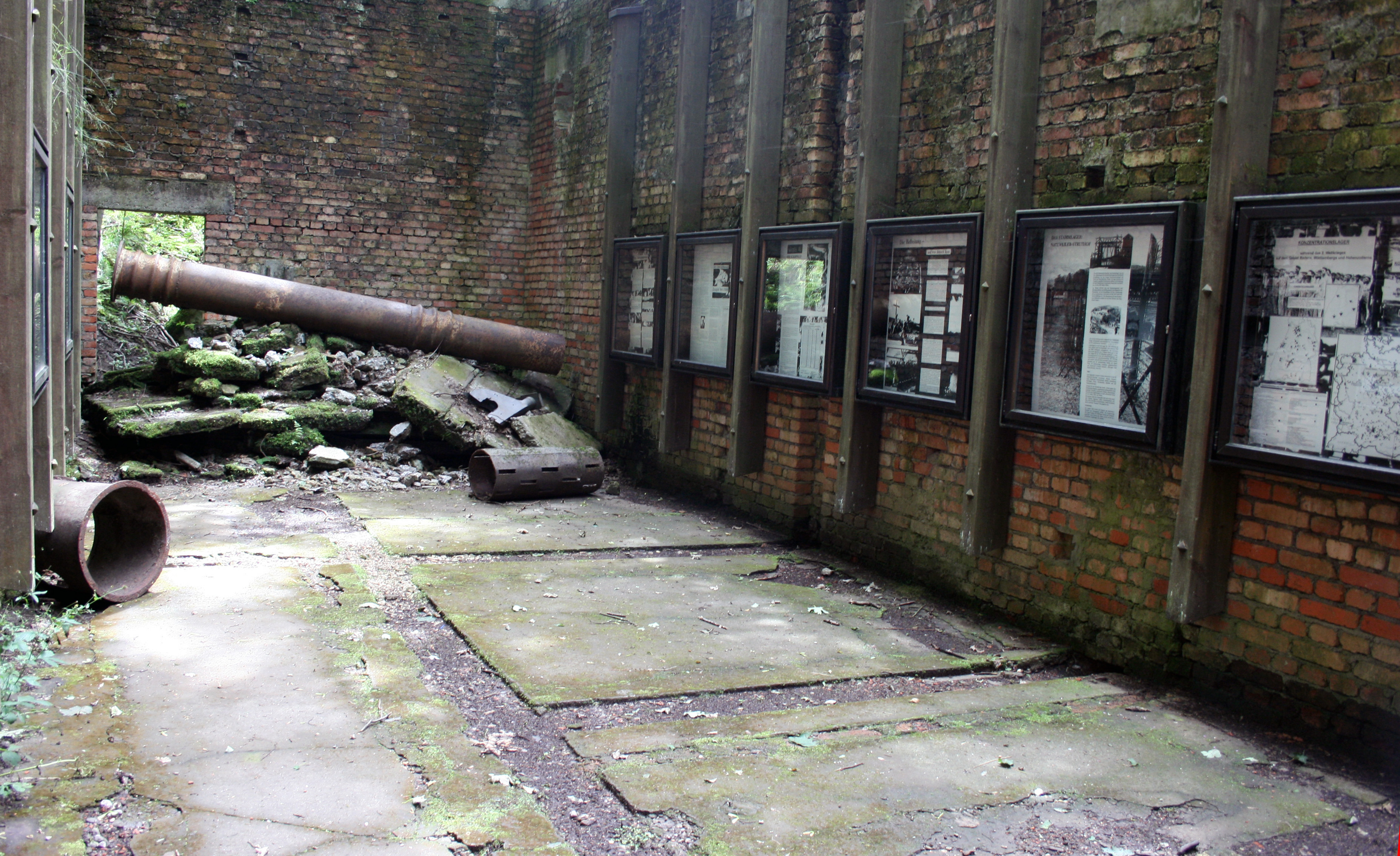
Documentation center inside the ruin of the gas purification factory. The incidents of the Unternehmen Wüste are described in ten showcases
