= Hong Kong Holocaust and Tolerance Centre =

Non-profit organization based in Hong Kong

- Hong Kong Holocaust and Tolerance Centre
- Location in Hong Kong
- Established: 2011
- Location: 460 Shau Kei Wan Road, Shau Kei Wan, Hong Kong
- Coordinates: 22.276462°N 114.229967°E
- Type: Holocaust centre

The Hong Kong Holocaust and Tolerance Centre (HKHTC) (Chinese: 香港猶太大屠殺及寬容中心; pinyin: Xiānggǎng yóutài dà túshā jí kuānróng zhōngxīn) is a Hong Kong–based, not-for-profit organisation dedicated to advancing Holocaust education and promoting tolerance situated in Hong Kong.

HKHTC was founded in 2011 and is the first organisation devoted to Holocaust education in the city. The Centre was founded by Hong Kong residents to raise awareness and promote education about the Holocaust both in Hong Kong and regionally.

HKHTC curates public exhibits, runs educational workshops and brings Holocaust survivors to the region in order to provide an educational opportunity which is uncommon in Asia. These activities have reached tens of thousands of students. The Centre also provides educational content and opportunities about other regional genocides, such as the Nanjing Massacre and the Cambodian genocide.
