= Jewish Cemetery (Anklam) =

Jewish cemetery in Anklam, Germany

Coordinates: 53°51′08″N 13°42′24″E

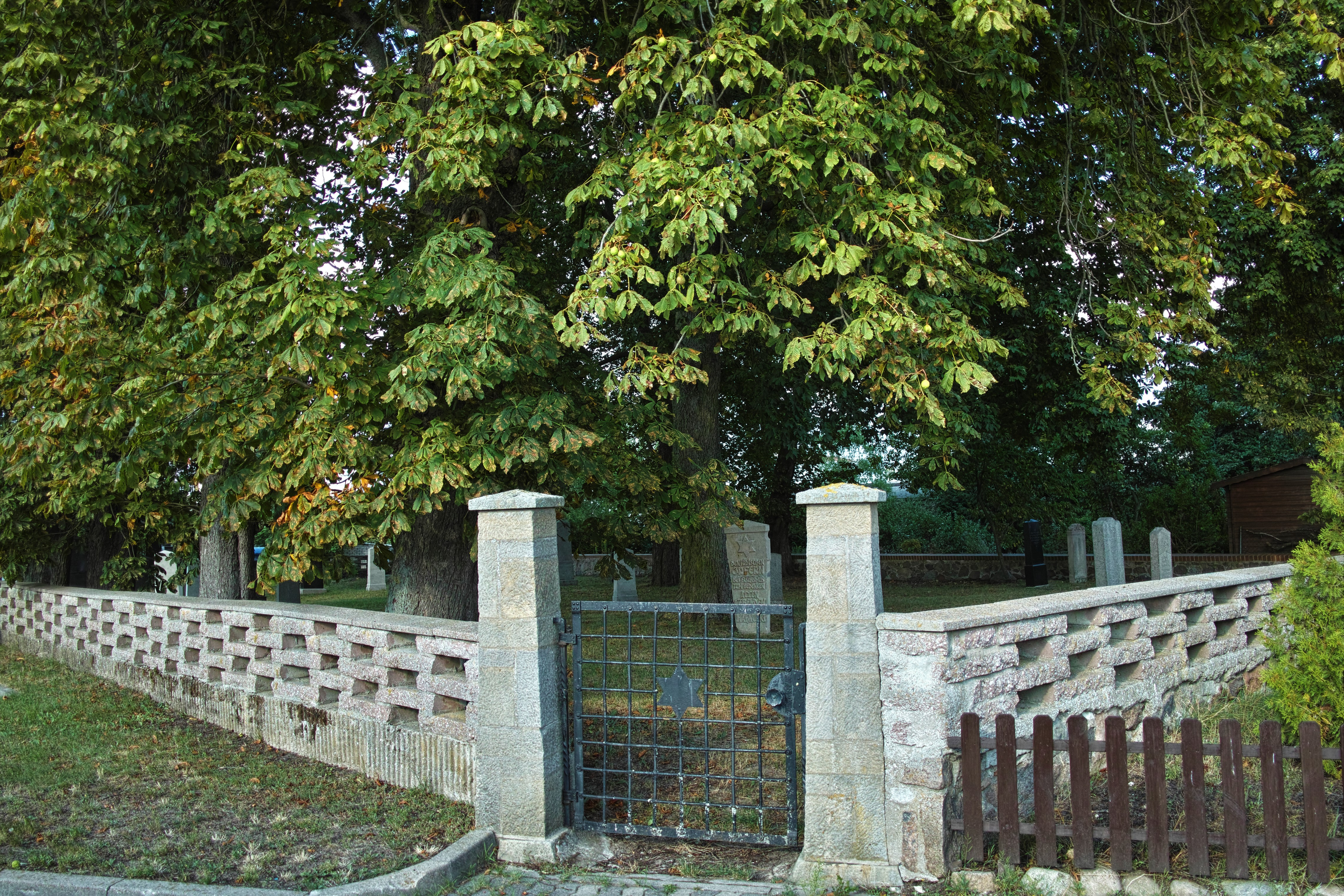
Jewish Cemetery Anklam

The Jewish cemetery in Anklam (German: Jüdischer Friedhof Anklam) is a Jewish burial place in the Western Pomeranian Anklam in the administrative district Western Pomerania-Greifswald in Mecklenburg-Western Pomerania.

Since 1962 it has been a memorial and is a protected historic monument.

== Description ==
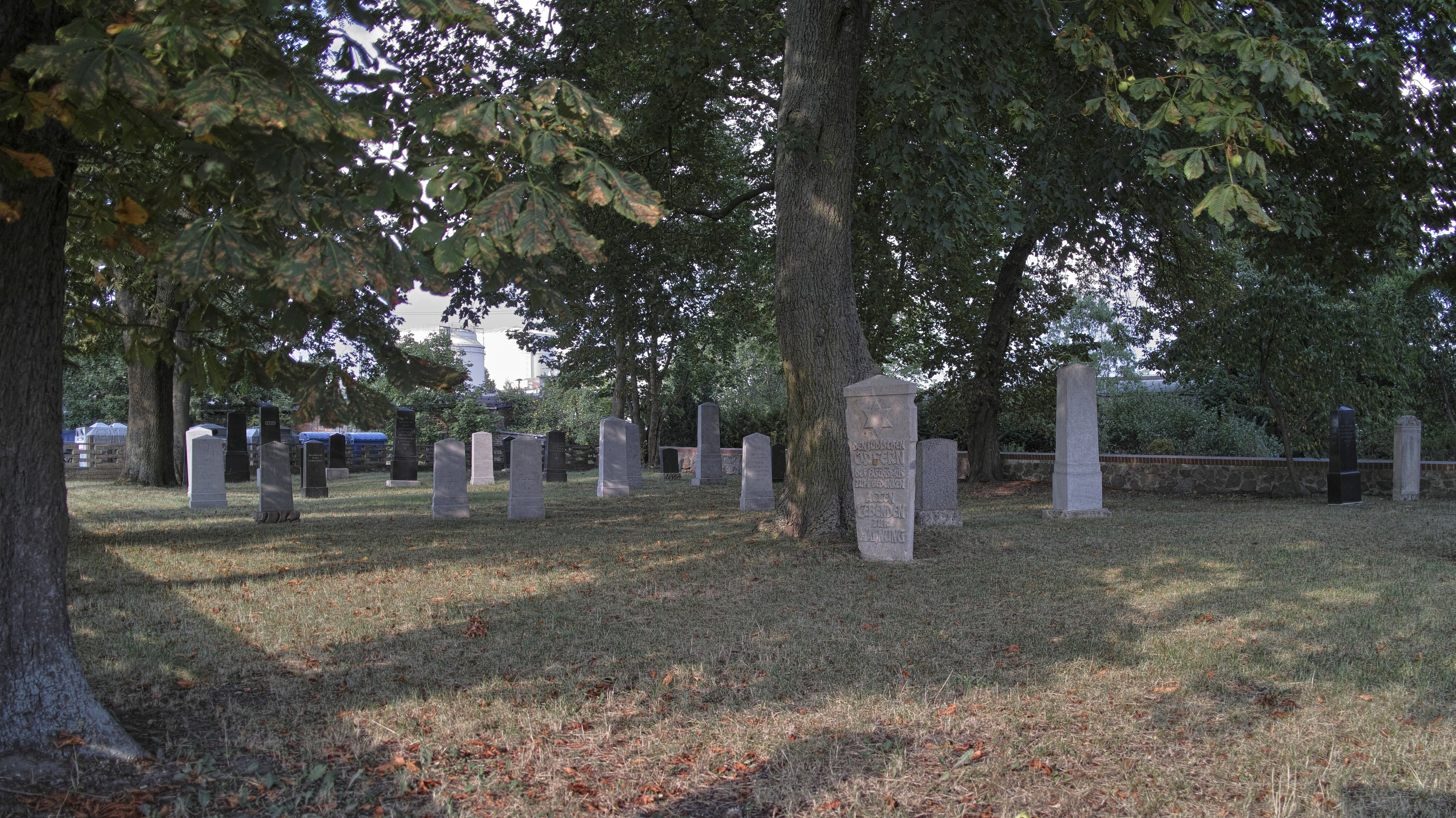
View from the entrance gate, in the background the sugar factory

The approximately 600 m^{2} Jewish cemetery in Anklam is located in the street "Min Hüsung", on Pasewalker Allee, outside the city center. It is situated in the middle of a housing estate, at the edge of an industrial area. The entrance is located at the southwest corner of the complex, in the street "Min Hüsung". Along the street "Min Hüsung" the complex is enclosed with a 1.3 m high ornamental wall of concrete and stones. It is separated from south and east adjoining private properties by a 0.50 m high field stone wall capped by a red clinker brick-on-end course and a newly planted hedge in front of it. There are no paths at the cemetery, the entire complex is laid out as a meadow. The southern part is planted with chestnut trees and the northern part with maple and ash trees.

On the cemetery there are 31 very well preserved gravestones dating from the end of the 19th / beginning of the 20th century. All gravestones face south with German inscriptions on the back. In the southern part of the cemetery there is a memorial stone with the inscription "In remembrance of the Jewish victims of fascism – a reminder to Everyone".

The whole complex is in a very good and well-maintained condition. Only the containers for recyclable materials set up in the north in front of the cemetery wall disturb the overall impression of the complex. Jewish cemeteries were marked in the official maps as burial places and signed with an L instead of a †. Mostly they were located further away from cities and communities, mainly in barn areas or similar remote places. In Anklam, the cemetery is located along the former railway station and railway line in front of the old town.

Around 1850 the cemetery was built on the outskirts of Anklam.

== History ==
The Jewish community in Anklam, which was founded at the beginning of the 19th century, was able to build its first cemetery in 1817, which seems to have been used only for a short time. Nothing remains of it. In 1925 the cemetery was made available by the Jewish community for the construction of a branch of the Reichsbank.

Around 1850 a new cemetery was built on the outskirts of the town, which was used until the Nazi era (1936 last funeral) but was later destroyed. In 1948 the cemetery was restored. There are 32 preserved gravestones. A memorial stone by the sculptor Bruno Giese was erected with the inscription: "In remembrance of the Jewish victims of fascism – a reminder to Everyone".

The old cemetery was situated in the Großen Wall (area of today's street "Großer Wall"); the new cemetery in today's residential area Lilienthalhof/in the street "Min Hüsung".

The last evidence for one of the larger Jewish congregations in Western Pomerania, the Anklamer congregation, is the Jewish cemetery at the "Min Hüsung". Here the last burials took place in 1936. During the pogromnight from 9 to 10 November 1938 the cemetery was desecrated. In 1940, in the name of the Reich Association of Jews in Germany and the dissolving synagogue congregation, the cemetery land was sold for 250 Marks to the Mecklenburg-Pommersche Schmalspurbahn AG, which had undertaken not to interfere with it. Following the bomb attacks on the town in August 1944, however, it was used as a dumping ground for rubble and the cemetery was largely destroyed. Until their deportation in 1942, 11 Jews continued to live in Anklam. The last Jewish residents of Anklam were deported on 11-12 February 1940 via Szczecin to the district of Lublin in occupied Poland; no-one returned.

In 1948 the cemetery was returned to the new Jewish congregation of Mecklenburg. At the beginning of the 1950s, the site was cleaned up and the stones were restored. Since 1962 it has existed in its present form as a memorial having been declared a memorial in the presence of a rabbi. The city has assumed responsibility for its preservation and care.
