= Park of Generous Souls =

Memorial park in Zvolen, Slovakia

- Park ušľachtilých duší
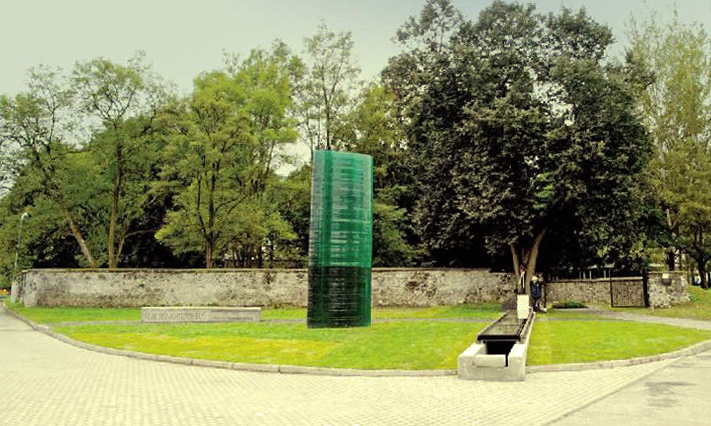
- Photograph of the Park in 2010

- Location within Slovakia
- Type: Memorial park
- Coordinates: 48.57062°N 19.11724°E

The Park of Generous Souls (Park ušľachtilých duší) is a park in Zvolen, Slovakia dedicated to Slovak citizens who helped save Jews during the Holocaust.
