= Freight Wagon Memorial =

Holocaust memorial in Hamburg

Coordinates: 53.587464°N 10.027059°E

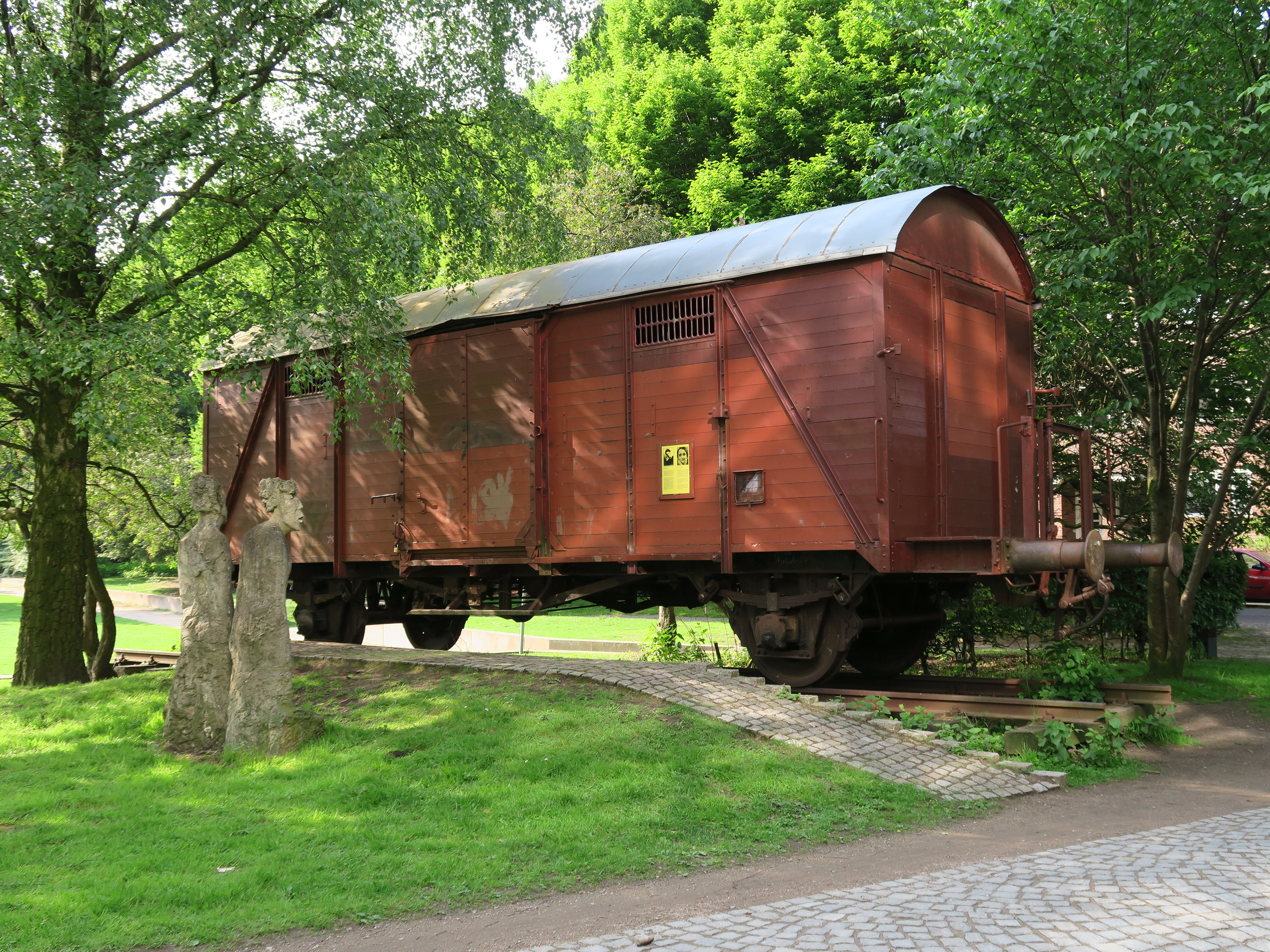
Freight Wagon Memorial in front of the school building

The Freight Wagon Memorial stands in front of the Winterhude district school in Hamburg-Winterhude. It depicts a group of figures by the artists POM and Cristine Schell as well as a covered freight wagon. It is intended to commemorate the deportation of two teachers who taught at the Hamburg school Meerweinstraße - representatives of the victims of National Socialism.

The installation was created through the initiative of a school project group from this school.

The standard designed covered freight wagons were intended by the Deutsche Reichsbahn for the transport of livestock and general cargo and are therefore sometimes referred to as "cattle wagons". They were mainly used in the East for the "transport of Jews" and thus became the "central symbol for the Nazi deportations." However, the wagon on display is a wagon of the type Gms39 built in Czechoslovakia starting in 1948 for the Deutsche Bundesbahn. In the deportation of German Jews, mostly old "third class" passenger wagons were used. The reports from Paul Salitter, who was in charge of the escort command of such a deportation train at the end of 1941, have been preserved.

== The teachers ==
=== Hertha Feiner-Aßmus ===
(* 8 May 1896 Hamburg; † March 1943 during transport to Auschwitz)

She studied education and worked as a teacher at the Meerweinstraße school until 1933. In 1933 she was dismissed from the teaching position and divorced from her husband. She then worked as an assistant teacher at a Jewish school. In 1935 she moved to Berlin and four years later, because of her ex-husband, sent her children to a boarding school in Switzerland on Lake Geneva. Hertha Feiner worked at various Jewish schools in Berlin. In 1941, she was forced to work for the Jewish community. There she had to help with the administrative preparations for the deportations. On 12 March 1943 she was deported to Auschwitz. She took her own life on the way there.

In 1992, the Hertha Feiner-Aßmus-Stieg in Winterhude was named after her.

=== Julia Cohn ===
(* 14 October 1888 Hamburg; deported to Riga on 6 December 1941, † between December 1941 and 1944 in the Riga-Kaiserwald concentration camp)

She was a teacher at the Humboldtstraße school (Barmbek) and at the school for language and trade courses for emigrants in Beneckestraße. On 1 April 1930, she moved to the newly built Meerweinstraße school. On 29 July 1933, she was dismissed from her teaching duties on the basis of the "Law on the Restoration of the Civil Service", according to which "non-Aryans" were not allowed to be civil servants. Only after long efforts and the influential participation of her husband in the First World War did she receive pension payments from October 1933. Her husband, Jacob Cohn, who had given up his cigar import business in 1927, worked as an accountant. The Cohn couple had a son (Paul Cohn) and lived in Klosterallee (Harvestehude) to enable their son to attend school at Grindel.

On 9 November 1938, Jacob Cohn was taken to the Sachsenhausen or Dachau concentration camp. After four months of intensive efforts on the part of the family and due to the front-line deployment during the First World War, Jacob Cohn was released from the concentration camp with the instruction to emigrate as quickly as possible. The Cohn family tried to find a way to emigrate. But they had no foreign relations, and an entry permit was only granted against the guarantee of a guarantor. On 30 May 1939 the family received the emigration permit.

The child Paul travelled to England on 21 May 1939 with a child transport. The couple did not know how to finance their own departure. When shortly afterwards the Second World War broke out, it was hardly possible for Jews to leave Germany. At the beginning of December 1941, the Cohn couple were asked to come to the Moorweide on 6 December in order to be transported from there to the East. Mr. Cohn believed that it was for a work assignment because the Nazis had asked the Cohn couple to take a spade with them.

In 1985, the Julia-Cohn-Weg in Alsterdorf was named after her.
