= Judenplatz Holocaust Memorial =

Memorial in Vienna, Austria

Coordinates: 48°12′42.1″N 16°22′10″E

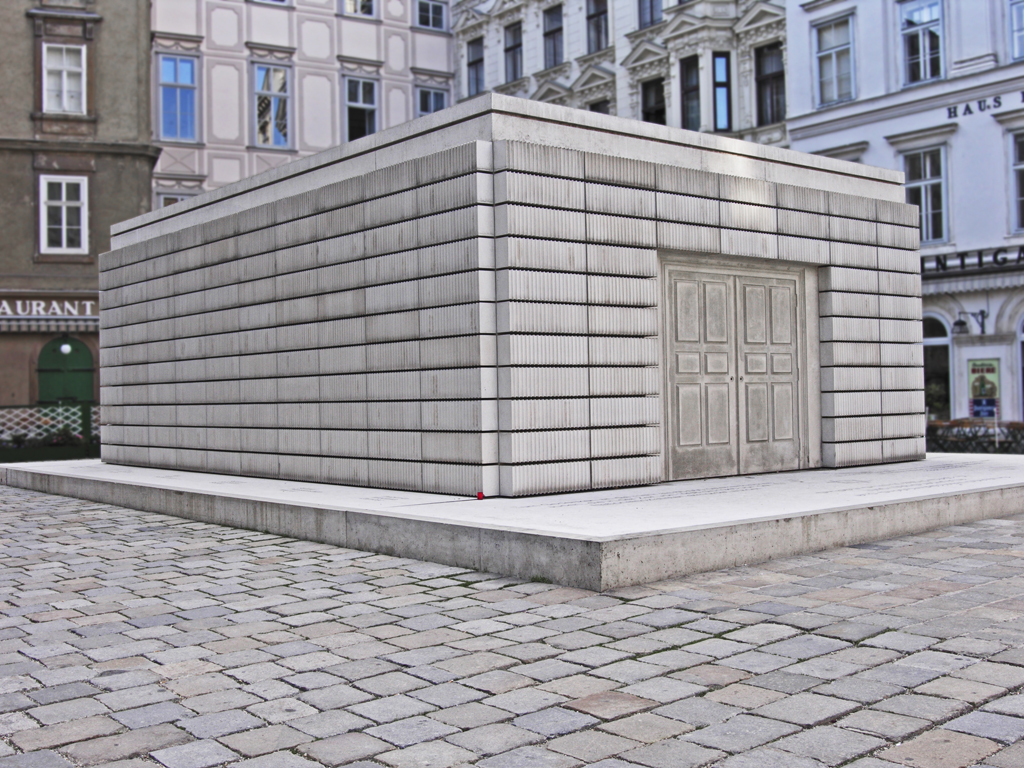
The Judenplatz Holocaust Memorial

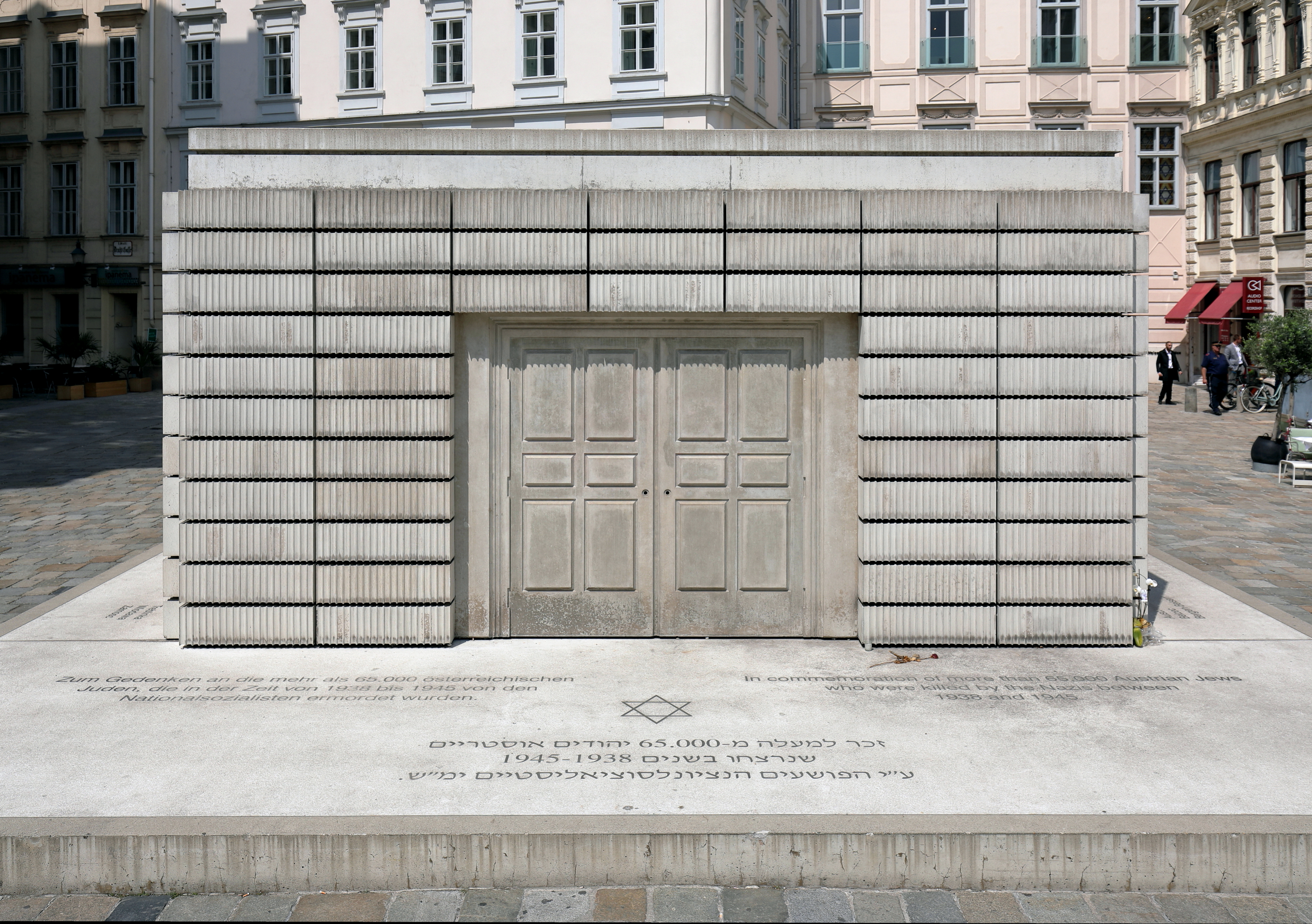
Mainside of the Holocaust Memorial

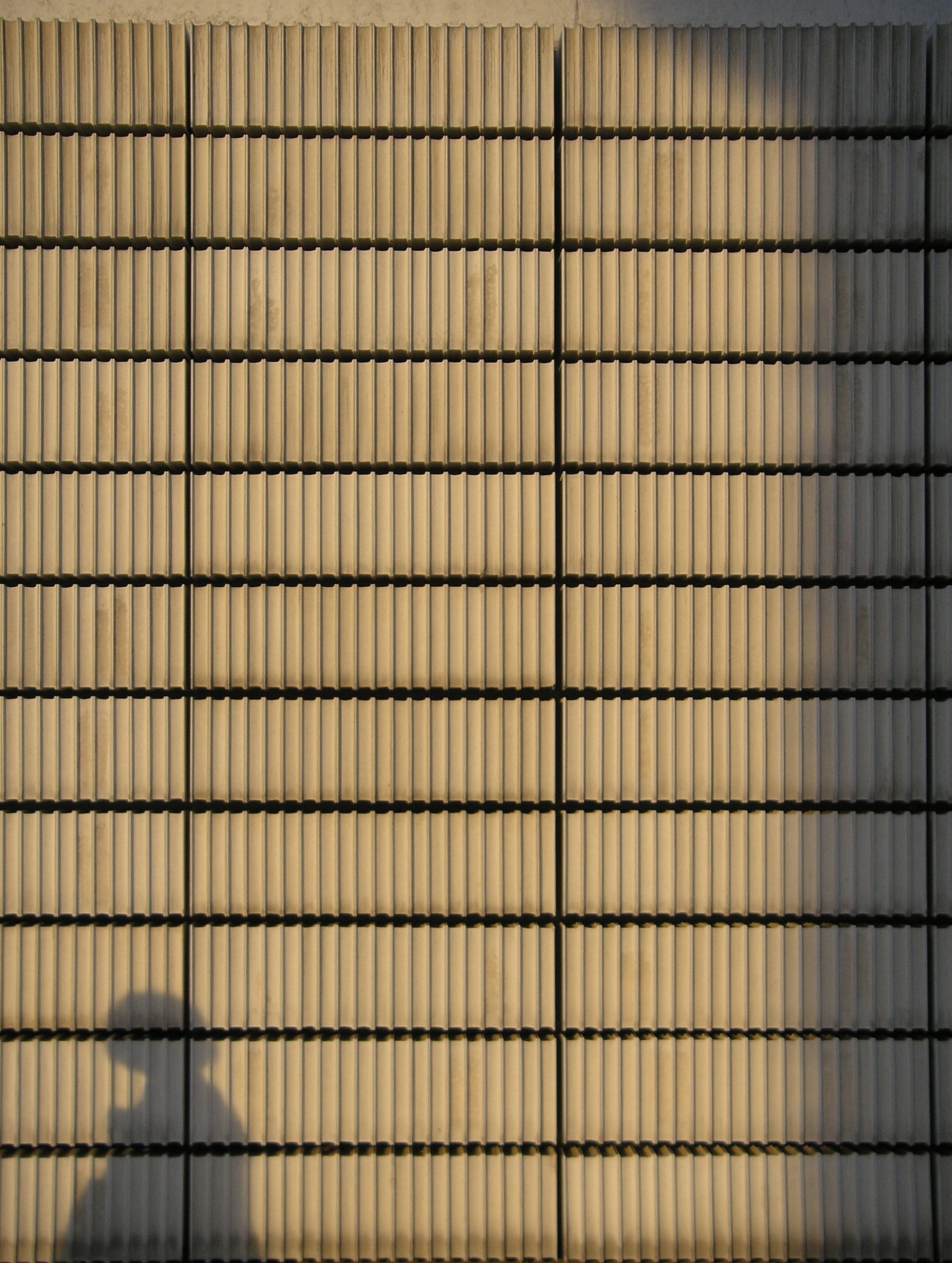
Shadow of a passerby at the memorial

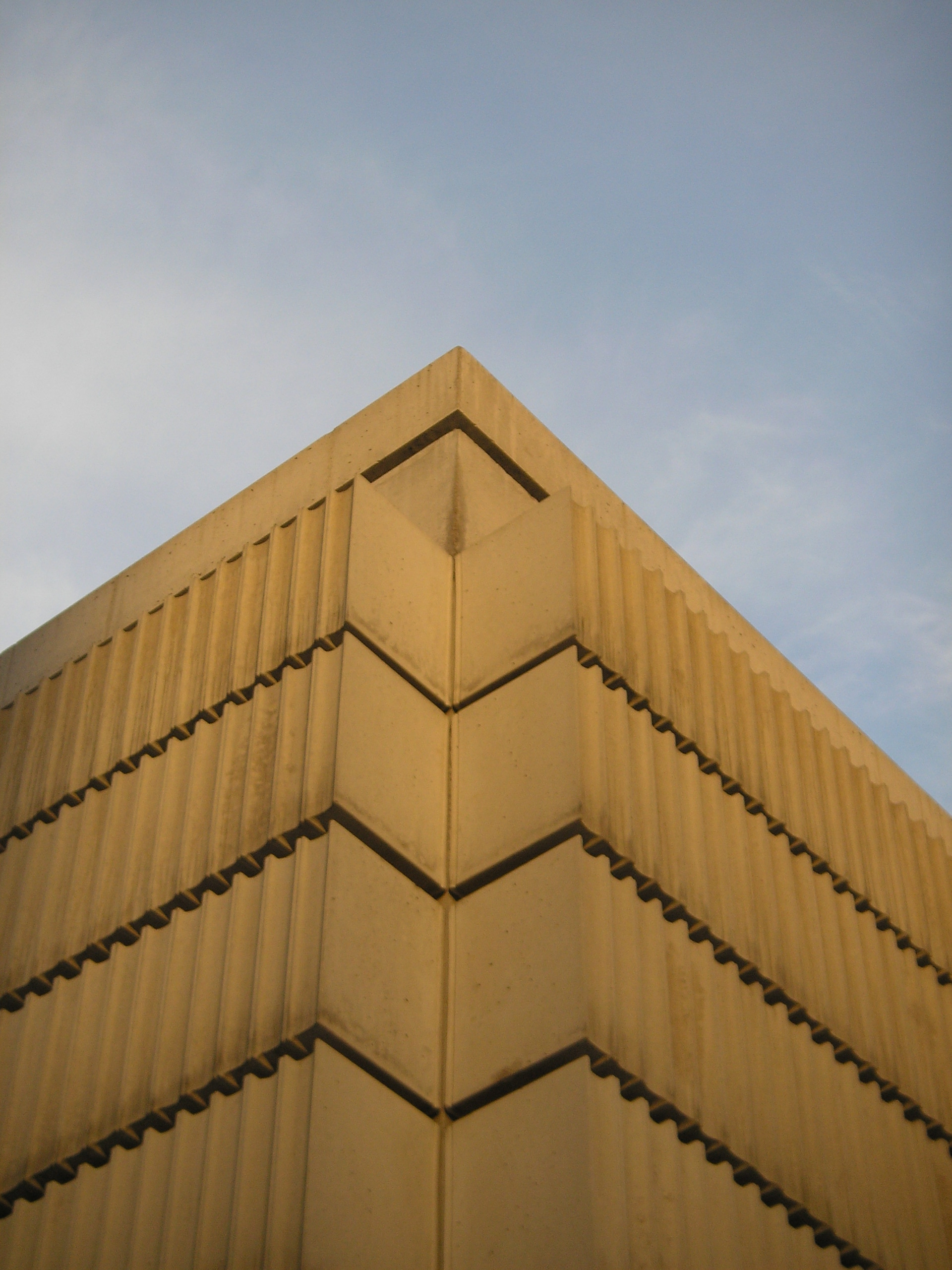
Corner detail view of the "books"

The Judenplatz Holocaust Memorial (German: Mahnmal für die 65.000 ermordeten österreichischen Juden und Jüdinnen der Shoah, "Memorial to the 65,000 Austrian Jews and Jewesses who were Murdered in the Shoah"), also known as the Nameless Library, stands in Judenplatz in the first district of Vienna. It is the central memorial for the Austrian victims of the Holocaust and was designed by British artist Rachel Whiteread.

== Conception ==
The memorial began with an initiative of Simon Wiesenthal. Wiesenthal became a spokesman for the public offense taken over the Mahnmal gegen Krieg und Faschismus in Albertinaplatz, created by Alfred Hrdlicka in 1988, which portrayed Jewish victims in an undignified way. As a result of this controversy, Wiesenthal began the commission for a memorial dedicated especially to the Jewish victims of Nazi fascism in Austria. It was built by the city of Vienna under the Mayor Michael Häupl, after Rachel Whiteread's design was chosen unanimously by an international jury under the leadership of the architect Hans Hollein. The members of the jury were Michael Haupl, Ursula Pasterk, Hannes Swoboda, Amnon Barzel, Phyllis Lambert, Sylvie Liska, Harald Szeemann, George Weidenfeld, Simon Wiesenthal, and Robert Storr. Individuals and teams of artists and architects from Austria, Israel, Great Britain and the United States were invited to the competition. They were Valie Export, Karl Prantl and Peter Waldbauer as a team; Zbynek Sekal; Heimo Zobernig, working with Michael Hofstatter and Wolfgang Pauzenberger; Michael Clegg and Martin Guttman as a team; Ilya Kabakov; Rachel Whiteread; and Peter Eisenman. The submissions had to take into account the design constraints of the site at Judenplatz, and texts including a memorial inscription and the listing of all concentration camps in which Austrian Jews were killed.

Originally scheduled to be finished on 9 November 1996, the 58th anniversary of Kristallnacht, the completion was delayed for four years due to various controversies both political and aesthetic, but also setbacks due to concerns over the archaeological excavations beneath the site. The total costs paid by the city of Vienna were 160 million Schillings, including 8 million for the memorial by Rachel Whiteread, 15 million for planning, 23 million for the beginning of construction work, 40 million for structural measures for Misrachi-Haus, and 74 million for the archaeological viewing area. The memorial was unveiled on 25 October 2000, one day before the Austrian national holiday. In attendance was the President of Austria Thomas Klestil, Mayor of Vienna Michael Häupl, President of the Israelitische Kultusgemeinde Wien Ariel Muzicant, Simon Wiesenthal, Rachel Whiteread, and further dignitaries and guests.

The memorial was created five years before the erection of the Memorial to the Murdered Jews of Europe in Berlin.

== Design ==
The memorial is a steel and concrete construction with a base measuring 10 x 7 meters and a height of 3.8 meters. The outside surfaces of the volume are cast library shelves turned inside out. The spines of the books are facing inwards and are not visible, therefore the titles of the volumes are unknown and the content of the books remains unrevealed. The shelves of the memorial appear to hold endless copies of the same edition, which stand for the vast number of the victims, as well as the concept of Jews as "People of the Book." The double doors are cast with the panels inside out, and have no doorknobs or handles. They suggest the possibility of coming and going, but do not open.

The memorial represents, in the style of Whiteread's "empty spaces", a library whose books are shown on the outside but are unreadable. The memorial can be understood as an appreciation of Judaism as a religion of the "book"; however, it also speaks of a cultural space of memory and loss created by the genocide of the European Jews. Through the emphasis of void and negative casting rather than positive form and material, it acts as a "counter monument" in this way opposite to the production through history of grandiose and triumphal monumental objects.

As a work of art, the memorial was not intended to be beautiful and as such it contrasts with much of the Baroque art and architecture of Vienna. A member of the design jury had noticed a resemblance to a bunker and the military fortifications of the Atlantic wall were later confirmed by the artist as a source of inspiration for the project. There is an aspect of discomfort in the monument that was meant to provoke thought in the viewer through the memorial's severe presence. It was intended to evoke the tragedy and brutality of the Holocaust and in the words of Simon Wiesenthal at the unveiling, "This monument shouldn't be beautiful, It must hurt."

At the request of the artist, the memorial was not given an anti-graffiti coating. She explained:

If someone sprays a swastika on it we can try to scrub it off, but a few daubed swastikas would really make people think about what's happening in their society.

== Engravings ==
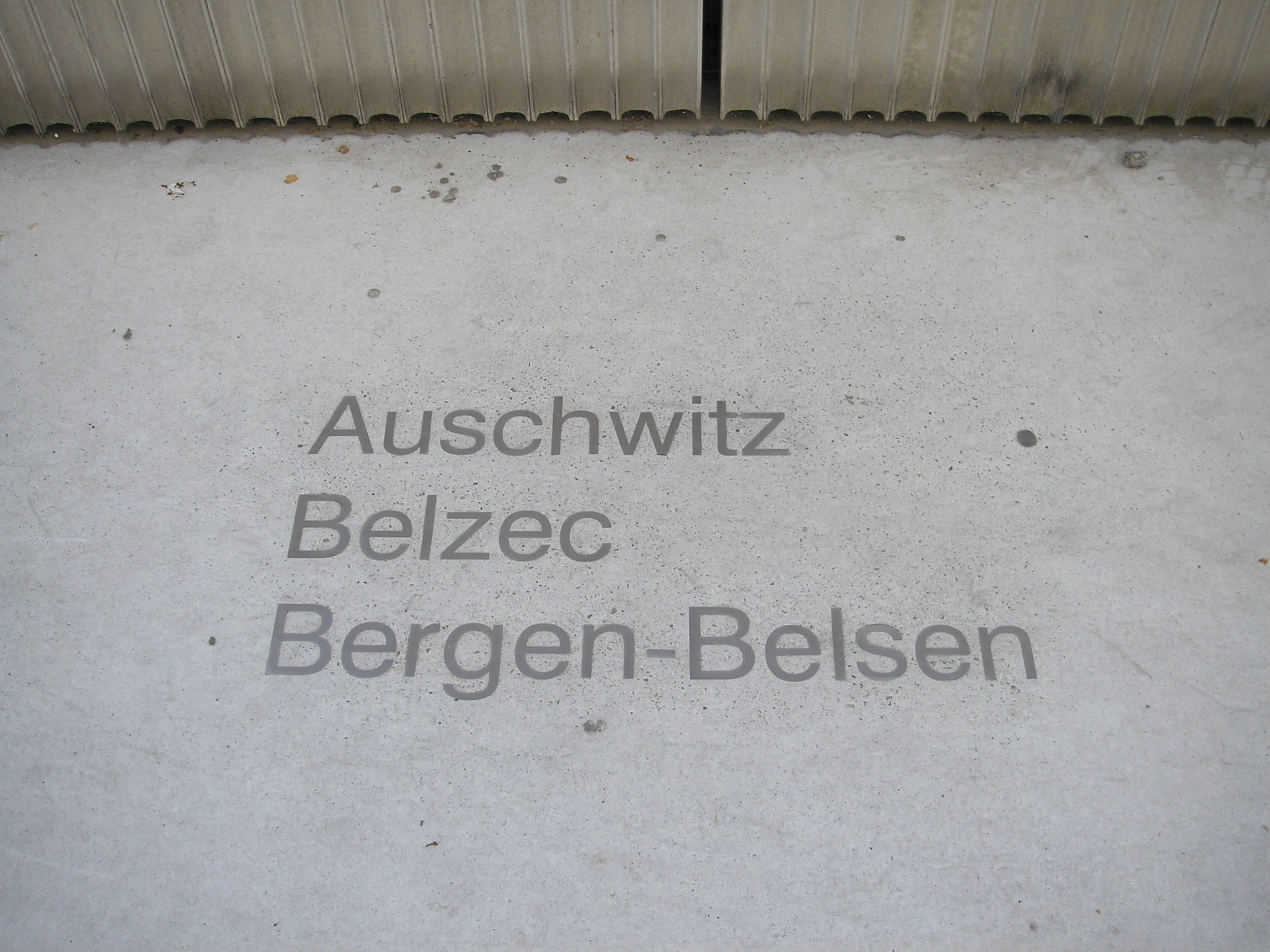
Engravings of the names of the concentration camps at which the victims were killed, at the foot of the memorial

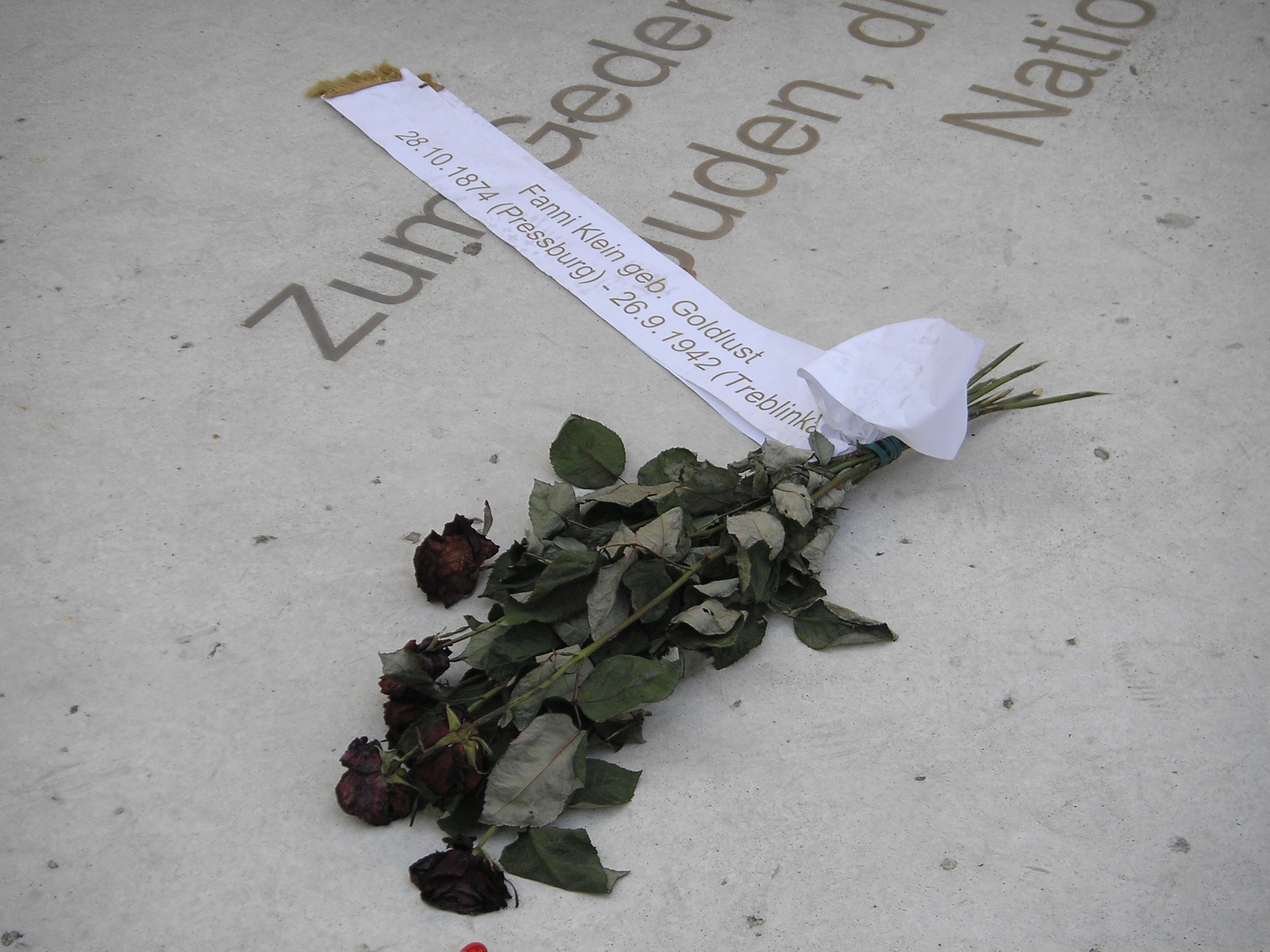
Roses for Fanni Klein, one of the Austrian victims of the Holocaust

Although no texts are found on the cast books, two texts are engraved on the base of the memorial. On the concrete floor before the locked double doors is a text in German, Hebrew, and English, that points out the crime of the Holocaust and the estimated number of Austrian victims. In the centre is a Star of David.

Zum Gedenken an die mehr als 65 000 österreichischen
Juden, die in der Zeit von 1938 bis 1945 von den
Nationalsozialisten ermordet wurden.

זכר למעלה מ-65.000 יהודים אוסטריים
שנרצחו בשנים 1945-1938
ע"י הפושעים הנציונלסוציאליסטיים ימ"ש.

(literal translation: memory of more than 65,000 Austrian Jews who were murdered in the years 1938-45 by the National Socialist criminals, may their names be obliterated.)

In commemoration of more than 65,000 Austrian Jews
who were killed by the Nazis between
1938 and 1945.

— Inscriptions below the doors.

Engraved on the plinth on the two sides and back of the memorial are the names of those places where Austrian Jews were murdered during Nazi rule: Auschwitz, Bełżec, Bergen-Belsen, Brčko, Buchenwald, Chełmno, Dachau, Flossenbürg, Groß-Rosen, Gurs, Hartheim, Izbica, Jasenovac, Jungfernhof, Kaiserwald, Kielce, Kowno, Łagów, Litzmannstadt, Lublin, Majdanek, Maly Trostinec, Mauthausen, Minsk, Mittelbau/Dora, Modliborzyce, Natzweiler, Neuengamme, Nisko, Opatów, Opole, Ravensbrück, Rejowiec, Riga, Šabac, Sachsenhausen, Salaspils, San Sabba, Sobibor, Stutthof, Theresienstadt, Trawniki, Treblinka, Włodawa, and Zamość.

== Judenplatz ==
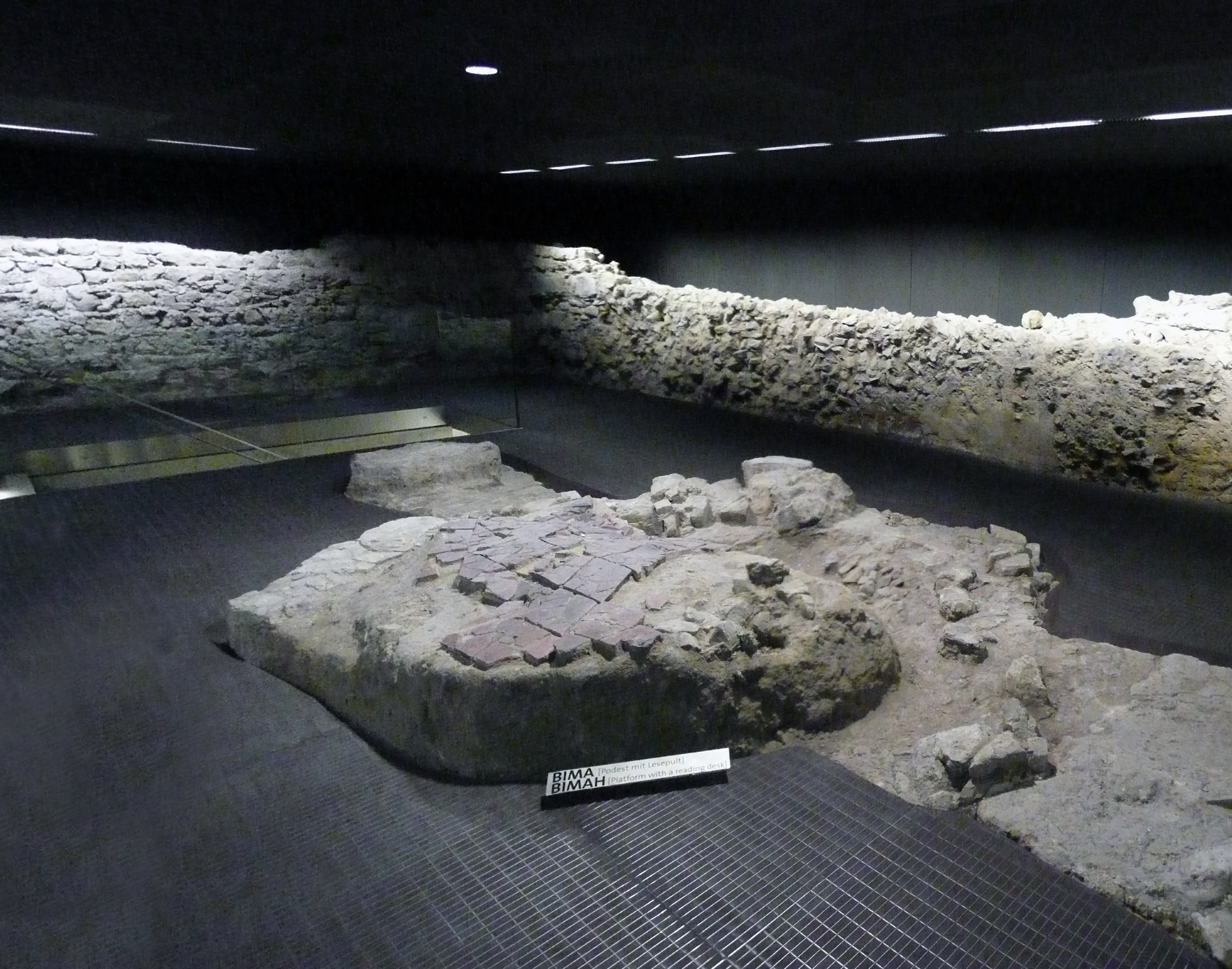
Remains of the medieval synagogue which were excavated during the construction of the memorial and later integrated

The Holocaust Memorial is site specific and would be entirely different if it had been planned and constructed on a different site. Therefore, it is intricately connected with the history, institutions, and other works of art in Judenplatz.

Judenplatz and the memorial are unique in Europe. The square unites the excavations of the medieval synagogue underground, that was burned down in the "Viennese Geserah" of 1420, with the modern memorial above ground. On the ground floor of the neighbouring Misrachi house, the Dokumentationsarchiv des österreichischen Widerstandes in co-operation with the Israelitische Kultusgemeinde Wien established an information area. Names and data of the 65,000 murdered Austrian Jews, and the circumstances that led to their persecution and murder, are publicly presented. The museum at the Judenplatz, which is in the Misrachi house, has a permanent exhibition about the history of Judenplatz, and the foundations of the destroyed Or-Sarua synagogue directly under the memorial can be visited. (see also: History of the Jews in Austria).

During his visit in August 2007, Pope Benedict XVI paid tribute to the victims at the monument, accompanied by the Chief Rabbi Paul Chaim Eisenberg and other dignitaries.

== See also ==
- List of Holocaust memorials and museums in Austria
