= Bombing of Vienna in World War II =

Bombing of Vienna
- Part of World War II
- Vienna after the bombings
Date	4 September 1942 – 16 April 1945
Location	Vienna, Nazi Germany

Belligerents
United States; Soviet Union; United Kingdom	(Nazi Germany) Germany

The city of Vienna in Austria was bombed 52 times during World War II, and 37,000 residences of the city were lost, 20% of the city's housing stock. Only 41 civilian vehicles survived the raids, and more than 3,000 bomb craters were counted.

== History ==
After a lone Soviet air raid conducted on 4 September 1942, Vienna was reached by western Allied bombers in 1944, when the Allied invasion of Italy allowed them to establish an air base at Foggia. After the Normandy invasion, the greater part of the German Air Force (Luftwaffe) was transferred to the West. The remaining Luftwaffe shot down one tenth of 550 bombers in June 1944.

The air defences of Vienna were aided by a ring of anti-aircraft batteries set up around the city and three pairs of Flak towers. These were large anti-aircraft gun blockhouses built in the city. The increasing lack of fuel by autumn 1944 caused artillery on the ground to be the only defence against air raids. It typically took some 5,000 small-calibre and 3,400 large-calibre shells to bring down one bomber. During the day, one out of 125 planes was shot down on average. During the night, that dropped to only one out of 145. However, roughly one third of the bombers and escorts suffered heavy damage. Some Vienna factories were moved to bomb-proof sites such as caves (e.g. the Seegrotte near Hinterbrühl) or hidden in other ways. The military industry boosted its production, also by use of forced labour of concentration camp inmates and POWs. Bypasses for traffic junctions had been established before the bombings, and traffic did not come to a halt until the very last days of the war.

By early 1945 Vienna had already faced 1,800 bombs. In February and March 1945, 80,000 tons of bombs were dropped by American and British aircraft, which destroyed more than 12,000 buildings and left 270,000 people homeless. The Red Army would cross the Austrian border on March 29 at Klostermarienberg (Burgenland) and Vienna would fall in late April after the Vienna offensive.

== List of raids ==
Chronology
Date	Target/Topic	
September 4, 1942	First air raid on Vienna during World War II	Petlyakov Pe-8 bombers flew a 3,200-kilometre (2,000 mi) round trip also reaching Budapest, Königsberg and Breslau
March 17, 1944	Floridsdorf	The first American air raid on Vienna targeted the Floridsdorf refinery and mined the Danube.
June 16, 1944	Floridsdorf	B-17s bombed the Florisdorf [sic] oil refinery On this date the 464 BG bombed an oil-blending plant at Vienna.
June 16, 1944	Kagran	B-17s bombed the Kragan [sic] oil refinery
June 16, 1944	Lobau	B-24s bombed the Lobau oil refinery.
June 16, 1944	Schwechat	B-24s bombed the oil refinery at Schwechat in Vienna (Schwechat became a separate city in 1954).
June 16, 1944	Winterhafen(de)	B-24s bombed the Winterhafen oil depot. An underground storage installation was just west of Mainz.
June 26, 1944	Floridsdorf	The Floridsdorf oil refinery and marshalling yard were bombed.
June 26, 1944	Korneuburg	The 461 BG bombed "a refinery in the open country near the small town of Korneuburg".
June 26, 1944	Lobau	
June 16, 1944	Schwechat	The Heinkel firm's Heinkel-Süd Schwechat aircraft factory, and Schwechat oil refinery were bombed.
June 16, 1944	Winterhafen	Winterhafen oil refinery bombed.
July 8, 1944	Floridsdorf	The 464 and 465th Bombardment Groups earned Distinguished Unit Citations.
July 8, 1944	Floridsdorf & Zwolfaxing	The 464 BG and 465 BG earned Distinguished Unit Citations, as the Heinkel-Süd plant in Floridsdorf was hit, destroying the third prototype of the He 177B four engined bomber, and possibly damaging the incomplete fourth prototype He 177B airframe.
July 16, 1944		The 32 BS bombed a Vienna oil refinery.
August 21, 1944		The 484 BG received its second DUC for bombing an underground oil storage installation at Vienna.
August 22, 1944	Korneuburg	B-24s bombed the oil refinery at Korneuburg. The 485 BG bombed the "Korneuburg [sic] Oil Storage".
August 22, 1944	Lobau	B-24s bombed the oil refinery at Lobau. The 461 BG bombed the underground oil storage at the refinery.
August 23, 1944	Vösendorf	472 B-24s and B-17s supported by P-51s and P-38s bombed the South industrial area of Vienna, including the Vösendorf oil refinery.
September 10, 1944		344 B-17s and B-24s bomb 5 ordnance depots and the SE industrial area in Vienna and 2 oil refineries in the area.
September 10, 1944	Schwechat	The 32 BS bombed the Schwechat oil refinery.
October 7, 1944	Lobau	The Lobau oil refinery was bombed. On this date, the 741st Bombardment Squadron flew over Vienna to hit an oil refinery.
October 7, 1944	Schwechat	
October 7, 1944	Winterhafen	The 485 BG bombed the "Winterhafen Oil Storage".
October 11, 1944	Floridsdorf	
October 13, 1944	Floridsdorf	The 463 BG bombed the Floridsdorf oil refinery. Eighteen B-17s were sent on this mission and two were lost.
October 17, 1944		The industrial area of Vienna was bombed.
November 4 & 7, 1944	Floridsdorf	The 32 BS bombed.
November 5, 1944	Floridsdorf	The 485 BG bombed the oil refinery.
November 15, 1944		US intelligence reported in February 1945 that the Vienna area had no fuel since November 15.
November 18, 1944		The 32 BS bombed a Vienna oil refinery.
November 19, 1944	Winterhafen	The 32 BS bombed the "Winterhafen" oil storage.
December 2, 1944	Floridsdorf	
December 18, 1944	Floridsdorf	
December 27, 1944	Vösendorf	
January 1945		The Lipizzan horses of the Spanish Riding School were evacuated.
February 7, 1945	^{[Expand]}	680 B-17s and B-24s bombed oil refineries at Schwechat, Floridsdorf, Korneuburg, and Kagran refineries in the Vienna, Austria area.
February 7, 1945	Floridsdorf oil refinery	
February 7, 1945	Kagran	The Kagran oil refinery was bombed "in the Vienna, Austria area".
February 7, 1945	Korneuburg	The Korneuburg oil refinery was bombed "in the Vienna, Austria area".
February 7, 1945	Lobau	The 32 BS bombed the Lobau oil refinery.
February 7, 1945	Schwechat oil refinery	
February 14, 1945	Floridsdorf	
February 14, 1945	Lobau	
February 14, 1945	Schwechat	
February 15, 1945	Korneuburg	
February 20, 1944	Schwechat	
February 20, 1945	Lobau	The Lobau oil refinery and the Floridsdorf marshalling yard at Vienna were bombed. "The attack was outstandingly successful, resulting in severe damage to the boiler house, virtual destruction of the distillation unit pump house, the "fractionating tower" probably hit, and serious damage to tankage and rail sidings.
March 12, 1945	Floridsdorf	B-24s and B-17s bombed the Floridsdorf oil refinery. The 747 bombers and 229 fighter planes caused heavy damage to the city centre and the Vienna State Opera and the Burgtheater burnt, and the Albertina, the Heinrichshof (on Ringstraße) and the Messepalast (Trade Fair Palace) were heavily damaged. The Philipphof (a block of apartments opposite to the Albertina and the State Opera House) collapsed, burying some 200 people who had sought shelter from the raid in its cellars. Most of the victims have never been unearthed and the Mahnmal gegen Krieg und Faschismus (English: Memorial against War and Fascism) has been erected there.
March 14, 1945		During the briefing for bombing the Vienna oil refinery, the briefing officer told crews to avoid the St. Stephen's Cathedral, the Vienna State Opera, the Schönbrunn Palace and other historic buildings and schools. Due to weather, the alternate target (Wiener Neustadt marshaling yards) was bombed.
March 15, 1945	^{[Expand]}	109 B-17s bomb the oil refinery at Ruhland (the Fifteenth's deepest penetration into Germany). 103 others bomb the alternate target, the refinery at Kolín, Czechoslovakia. 470+ other bombers attack targets in Austria, including Moosbierbaum, Schwechat, and Vienna/Floridsdorf oil refineries.
March 16, 1945	Floridsdorf	
March 16, 1945	Korneuburg	
March 1945 (mid)		300 bombs were dropped on the Tiergarten Schönbrunn, the world's oldest zoo. 2,000 animals out of 3,500 died.
March 16, 1945	Schwechat	
March 20, 1945	^{[Expand]}	In Austria, 760+ B-17s and B-24s, with fighter escort, hit the Korneuburg and Kagran oil refineries.
March 21, 1945		3 oil refineries and a goods depot bombed at Vienna.
March 21, 1945	Floridsdorf	The 32 BS bombed.
March 22, 1945		2 Vienna oil refineries were bombed.
March 23, 1945		Vienna oil refinery(ies) bombed. On April 2, Soviet troops began the Vienna Offensive.
March 30, 1945	North Goods Depot	In the last Lone Wolf mission, 11 x aircraft using PFF strike Wien North Goods yard between 1034 ~ 1220 hrs.
April 16, 1945		"The advances of our ground forces have brought to a close the strategic air war waged by the United States Strategic Air Forces and the Royal Air Force Bomber Command." (Spaatz dispatch to Doolittle and Twining).
