= Memorial against war and fascism =

Sculpture in Vienna by Alfred Hrdlicka

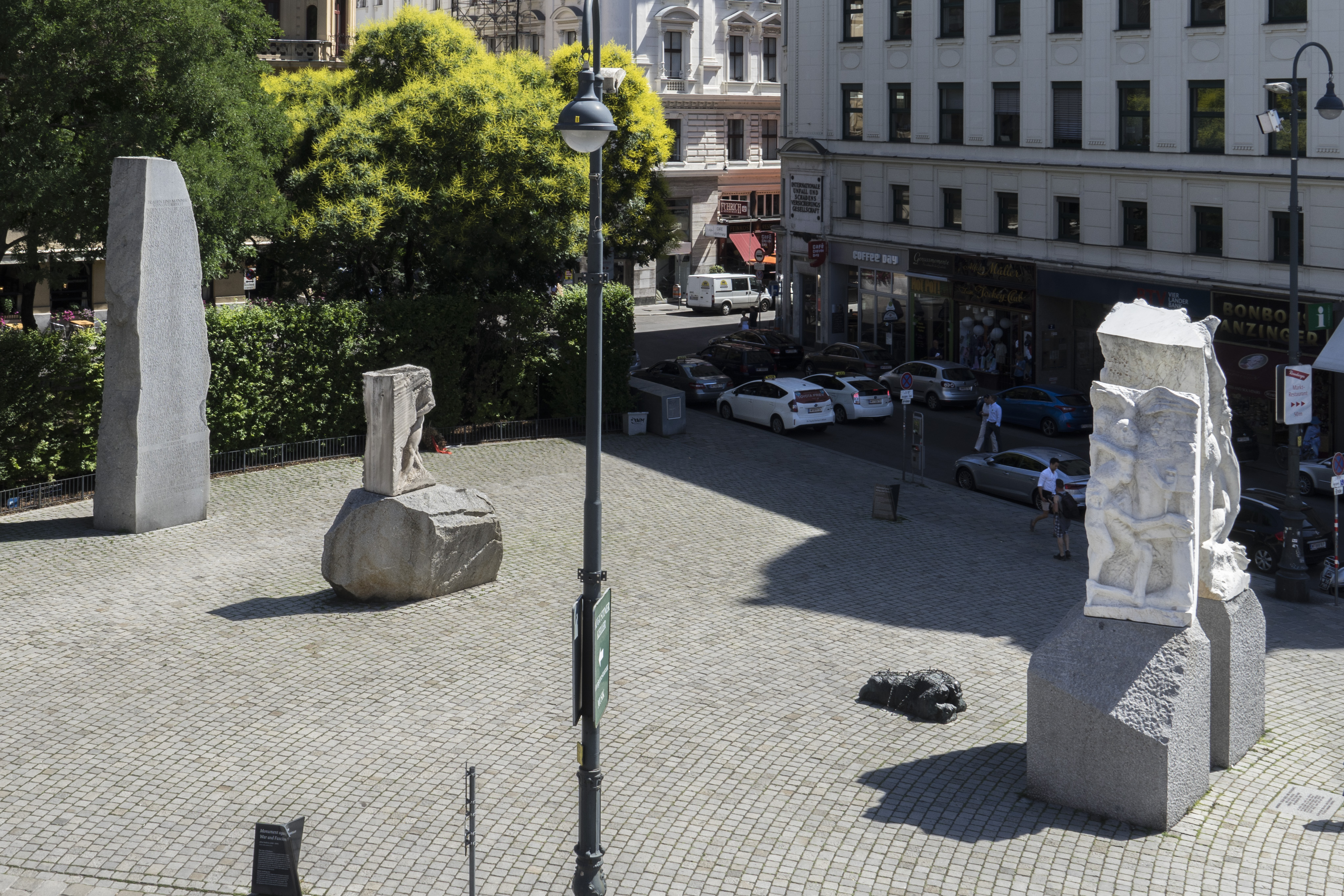
The memorial against war and fascism at the Helmut-Zilk-Platz

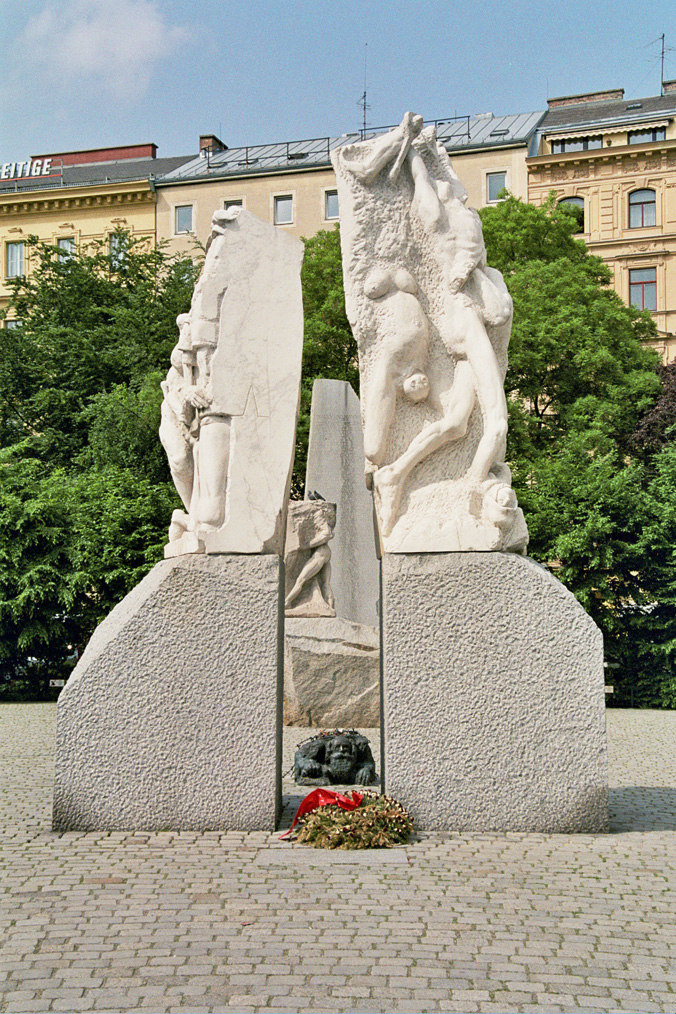
The "Gate of Violence" with the bronze sculpture of the kneeling Jew

The memorial against war and fascism (German: Mahnmal gegen Krieg und Faschismus) is a work by the Austrian sculptor Alfred Hrdlicka. It has been standing since 1988 on the Albertinaplatz in Vienna – named after Helmut Zilk in 2009 – opposite the Palais Archduke Albrecht and the back of the Vienna State Opera. As a walk-in monument, it is intended to serve as a reminder of the darkest epoch in Austrian history. It is dedicated to all victims of war and fascism.

== History ==
Here stood the Philipphof, a representative large residential building of the Gründerzeit, which was destroyed by a bomb attack on 12 March 1945. Hundreds of people who had sought shelter in the cellars were killed. Some of the buried could not be excavated; only 180 bodies were recovered. The exact number of victims could not be determined. The ruin was leveled in 1947, the property owned by the state was no longer developed.

In the Austrian year of reflection 1988, the City of Vienna erected the "Memorial against War and Fascism" on the initiative of Mayor Helmut Zilk. The Austrian sculptor, Alfred Hrdlicka was responsible for the design and execution. It was unveiled on 24 November 1988.

== The memorial ==
At the front of the square stands the Gate of Violence. It is made of granite, as it was dragged by thousands of prisoners over the death stairs in the quarry of the Mauthausen concentration camp. The sculpture on the left is intended to commemorate the victims of the mass murder perpetrated by the National Socialists there and in other camps and prisons, as well as the victims of resistance and persecution for reasons of national, religious and ethnic origin, mental and physical disability, and sexual orientation. The group of figures on the right gate column is dedicated to the memory of all the victims of the war. The faceless body of a woman giving birth is supposed to symbolize the rebirth of Austria after the horrors of war.

The first victims of the National Socialist rulers, along with the political opponents, were the Jews. After the Anschluss (annexation) of Austria to the German Reich on 12 March 1938, Jews were forced to scrub the streets to remove pro-Austrian and anti-Nazi slogans. The bronze sculpture of a kneeling Jew scrubbing the street recalls this degradation and humiliation that preceded the merciless persecution and murder of Jewish citizens immediately after the Anschluss.

Orpheus enters Hades, a male figure rising in a block of marble, a memorial to the bomb victims and the sacrifices of those who resisted National Socialism at the risk of their lives.

On 27 April 1945, when there was still fighting in western Austria, the representatives of the new or reconstituted political parties proclaimed the re-establishment of the Republic of Austria in Vienna through the Austrian Declaration of Independence. Excerpts from the Declaration of Independence and the names of the men who signed it are perpetuated on the stone of the Republic. It is made of Mauthausen granite from the Perg Trommelberg quarry, weighs 57 tons, is 8.4 meters high and is therefore the largest monolith ever supplied from the Mühlviertel quarries.

== Gallery ==
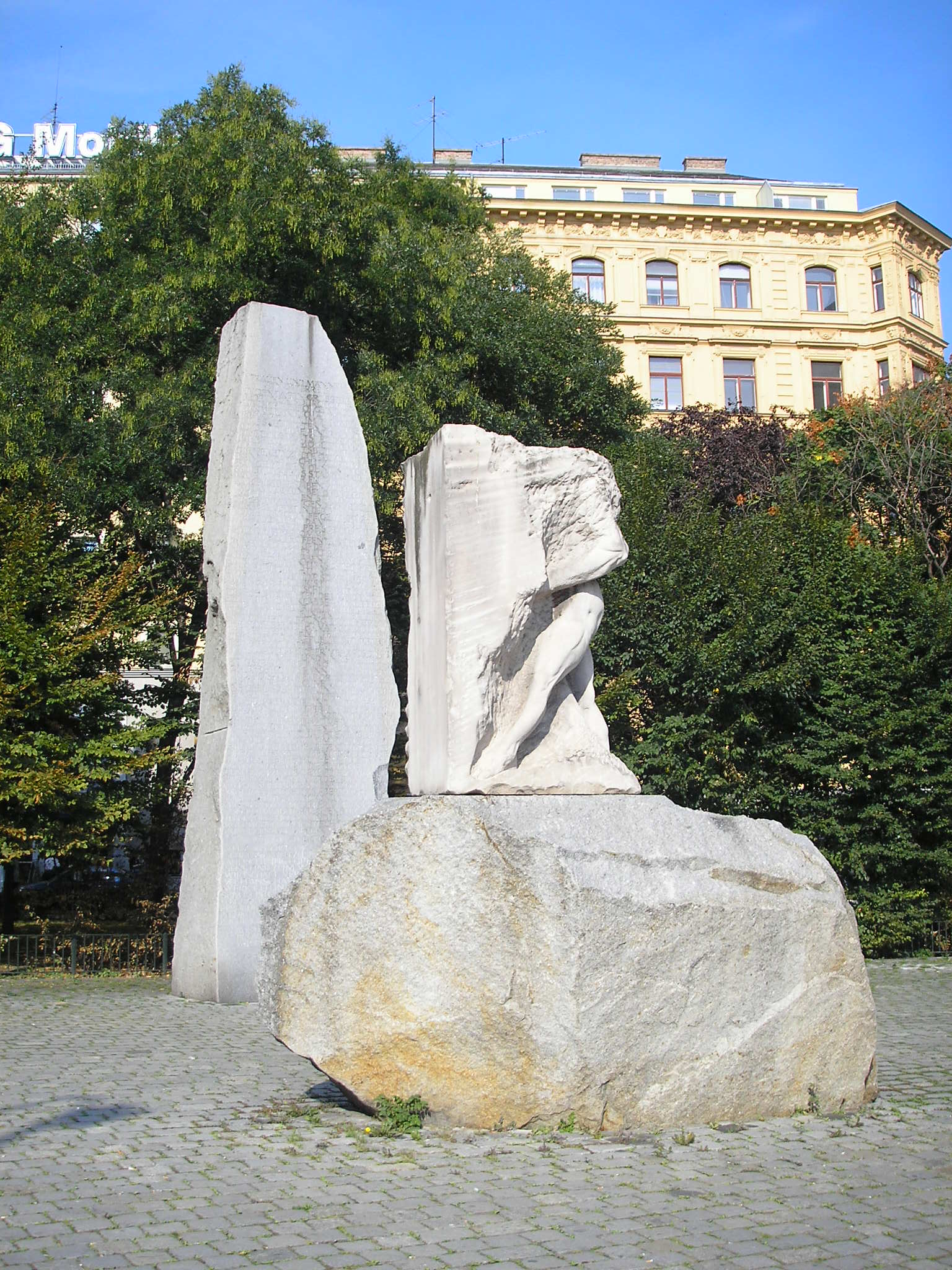
"Orpheus enters Hades" with the "Stone of the Republic" in the background

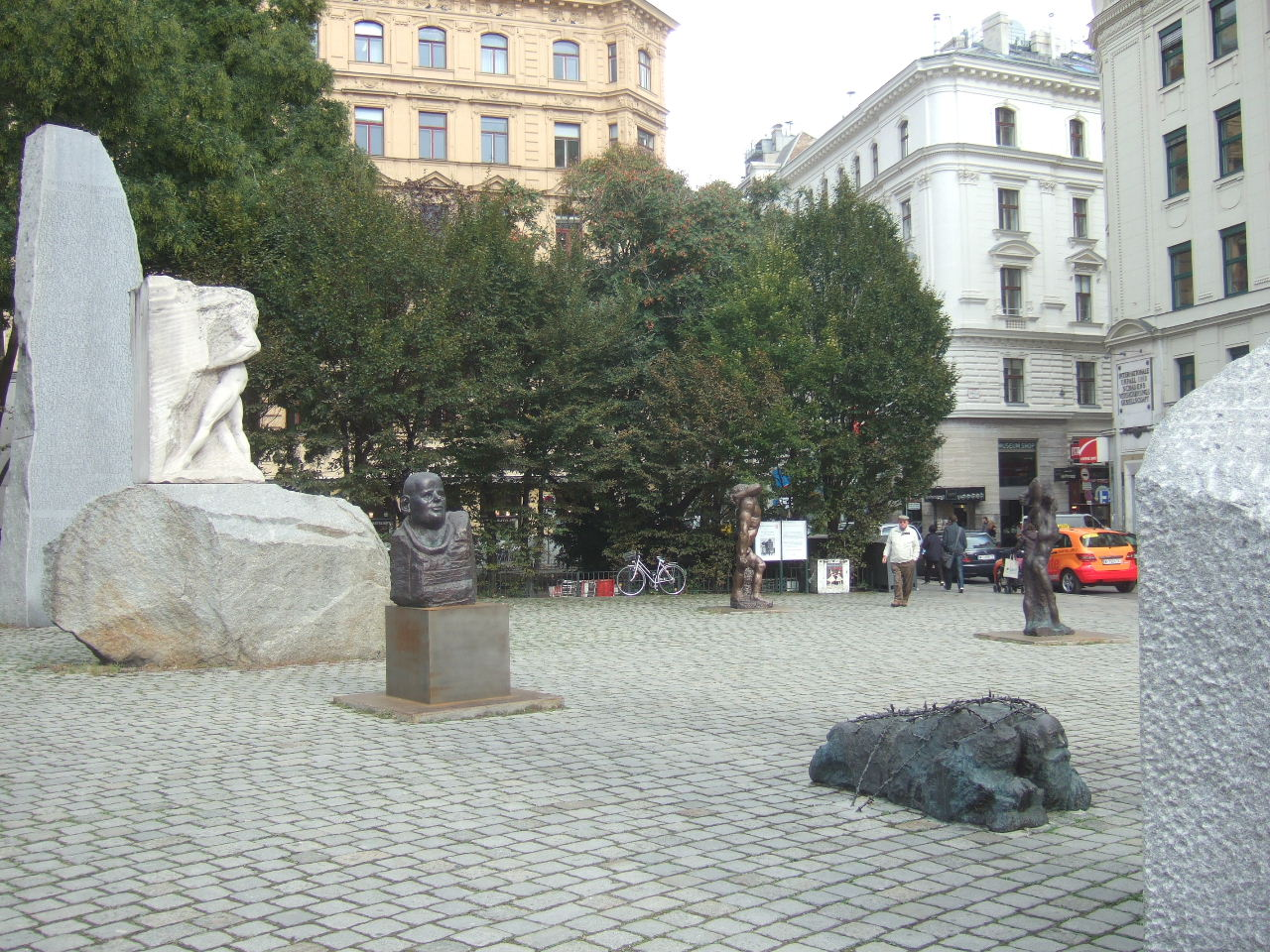
Memorial (2009) with three additions: "Portrait Bonhoeffer"/ "Orpheus II" (back left)/"Orpheus I" (back right)

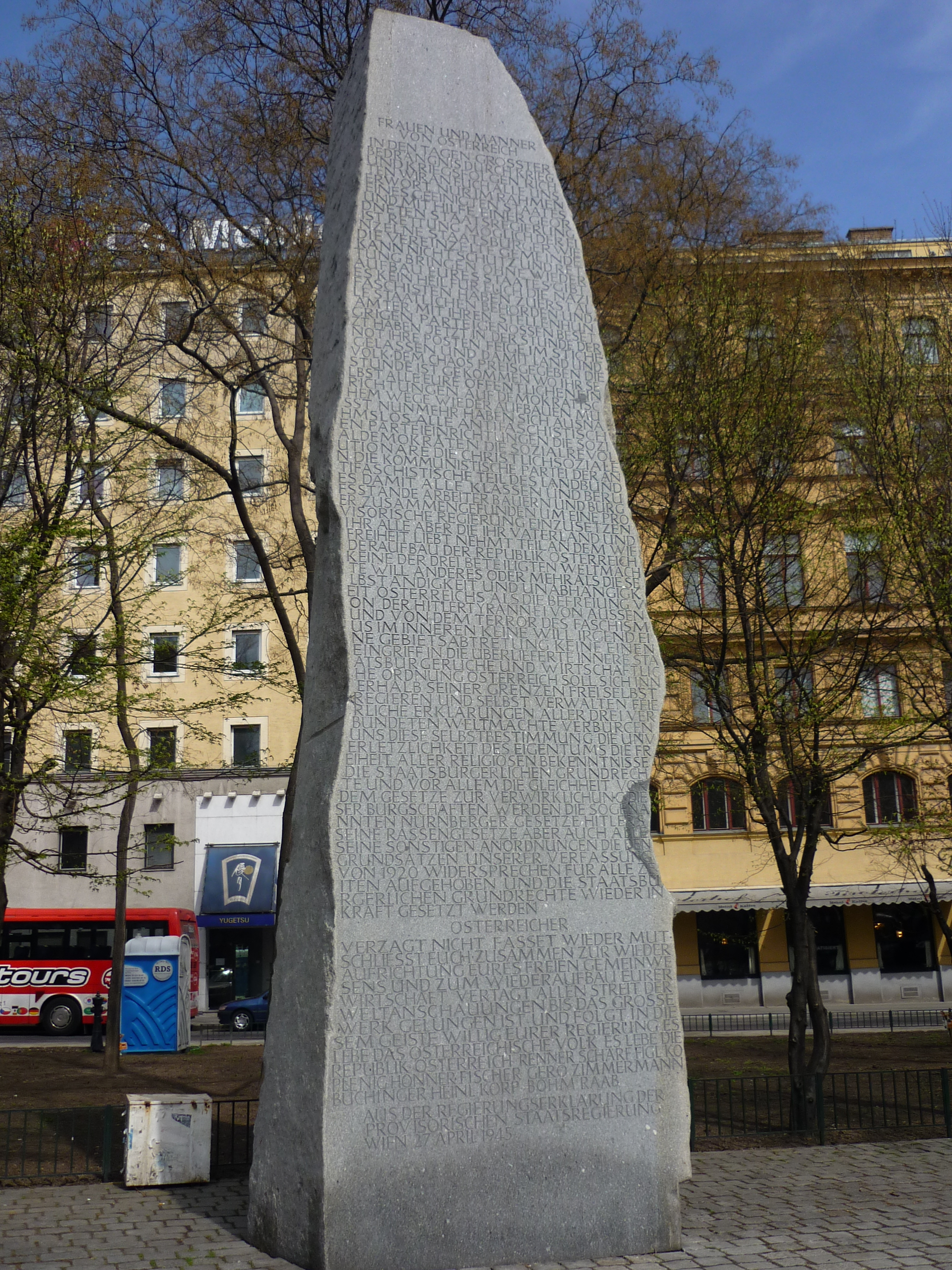
"Stone of the Republic"

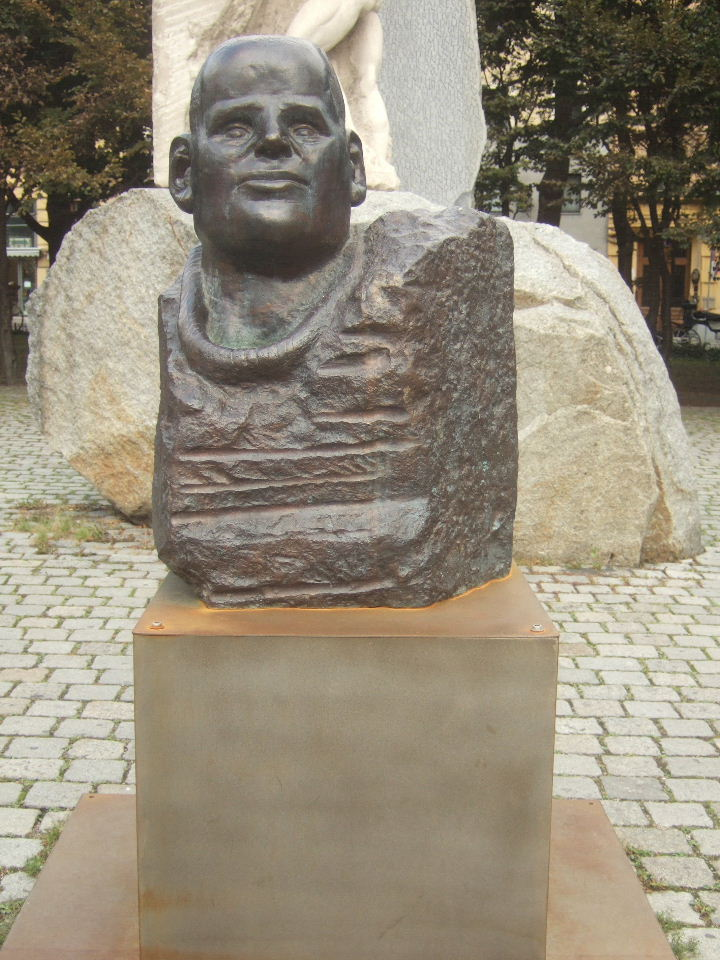
"Portrait Bonhoeffer" (1977)

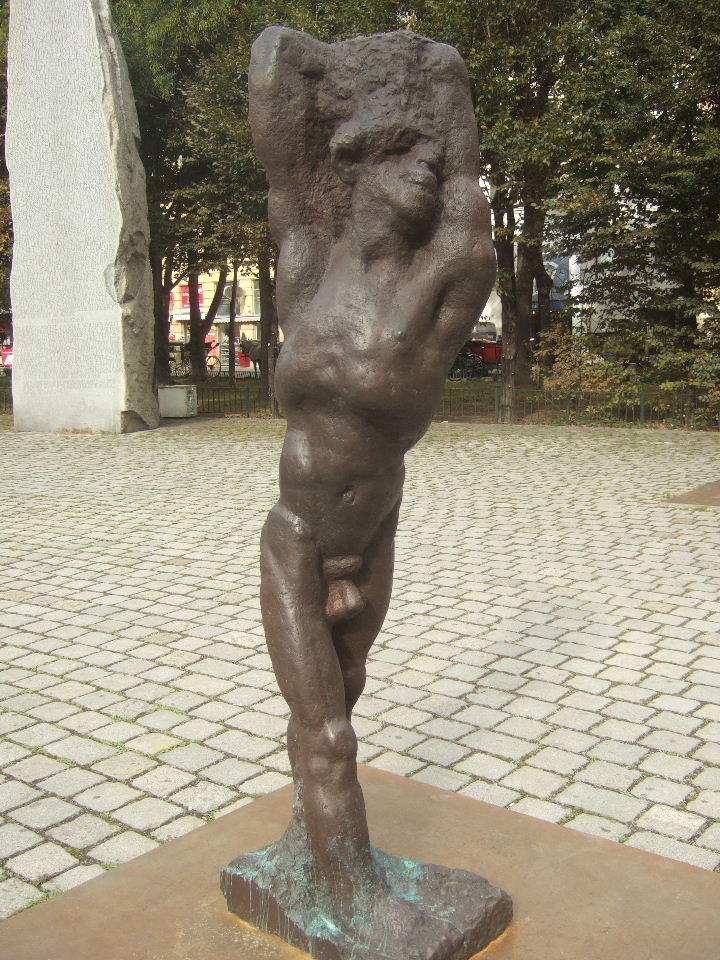
"Orpheus I" (1963)

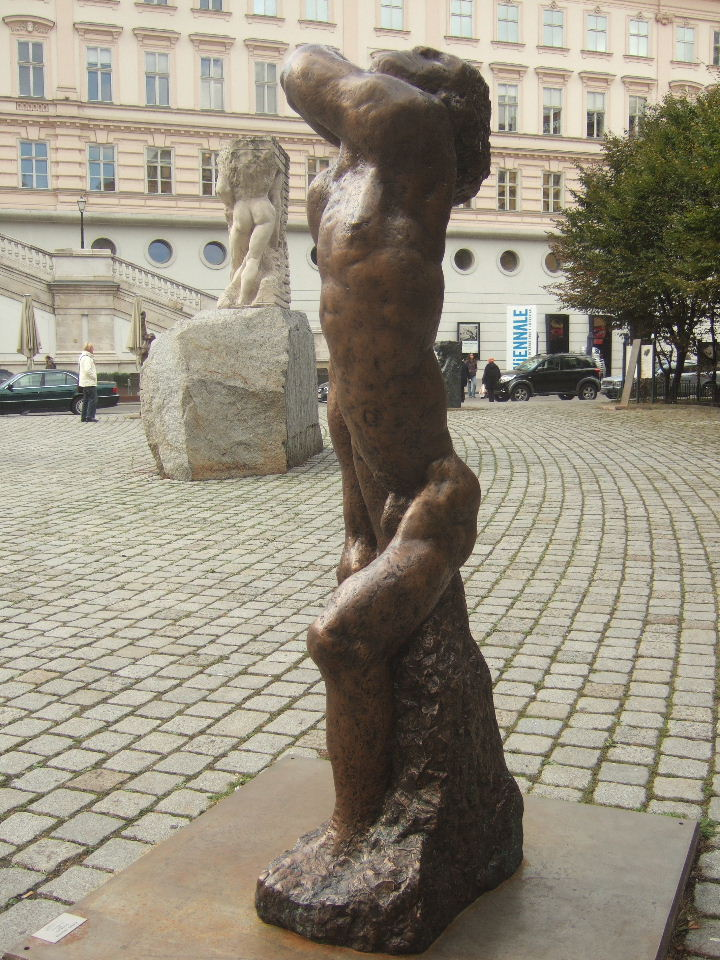
"Orpheus II" (1963)

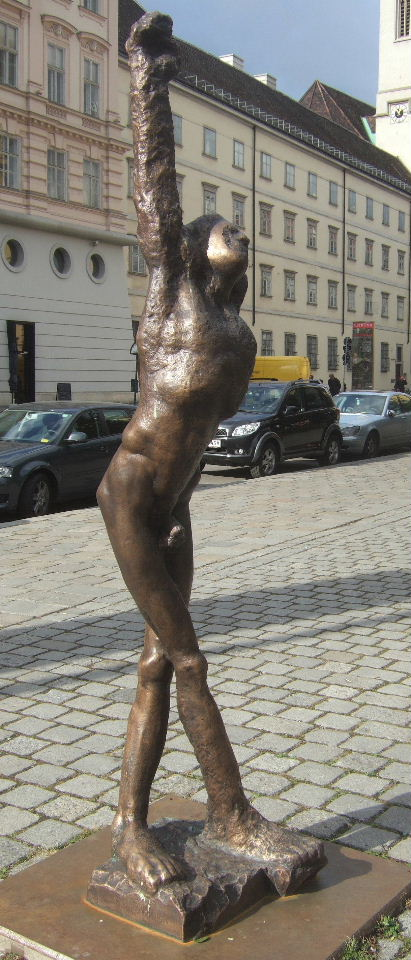
"Marsyas I" (1955/57 - 1962)

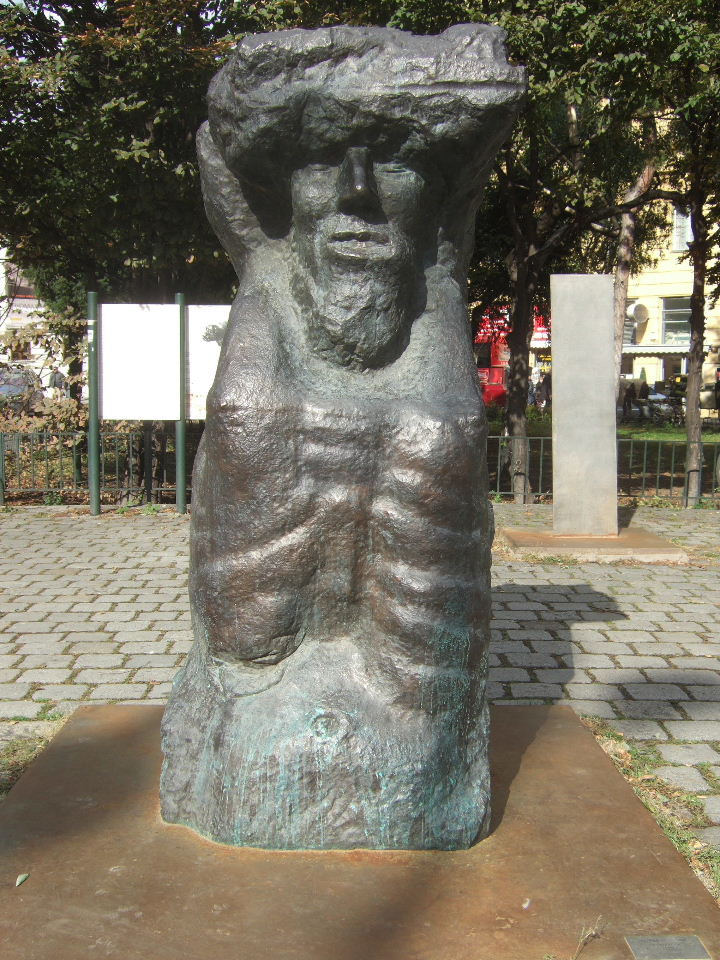
"Incarnation" (1994 - 1996)

== Acceptance ==
The erection of the memorial was accompanied by criticism at that time. On the one hand, some did not want to remember the role of the Austrians during National Socialism, others found the central location near the State Opera and the Albertina offensive. On the other hand, the term "all victims of war" was criticized. The sculpture on the right shows a fallen Wehrmacht soldier with a steel helmet lying on the ground. Representatives of the Jewish community, such as Simon Wiesenthal, then campaigned for a separate memorial for the Jewish victims, which was erected at the Judenplatz in 2000.

The sculpture of the Jew forced to scrub the streets of anti-Nazi slogans was often not recognized as such. Some visitors sat down on the statue’s back. The gold artist and sculptor Johannes Angerbauer-Goldhoff painted the sculpture with gold paint in a pre-announced artistic protest ZAHN-GOLD-ZEIT-GOLD (tooth-gold-time-gold) on 25 May 1990. The artistic protest was observed throughout by two state policemen and a detective. The artist was subsequently arrested and the sculpture was immediately removed. Mayor Helmut Zilk (the corresponding part of Albertinaplatz was named after him in 2009), as representative of the City of Vienna which owned the statue, initially reacted by charging the artist with damage to property. A planned lawsuit against the artist was officially suspended on 21 January 1991. In response, Alfred Hrdlicka added iron barbed wire to the back of the statue to prevent people from sitting on the statue. However, the shiny surface of the spikes show that people do still sit on the sculpture.

Over the years, the memorial has found general acceptance and is now a much-visited place.

Ruth Beckermann supplemented the memorial in March 2015 with a temporary installation that showed private film footage of an instance when Viennese Jews were forced to scrub the streets by Viennese National Socialists in the spring of 1938.
