= Judenplatz =

Square in Vienna

Coordinates: 48°12′42″N 16°22′11″E

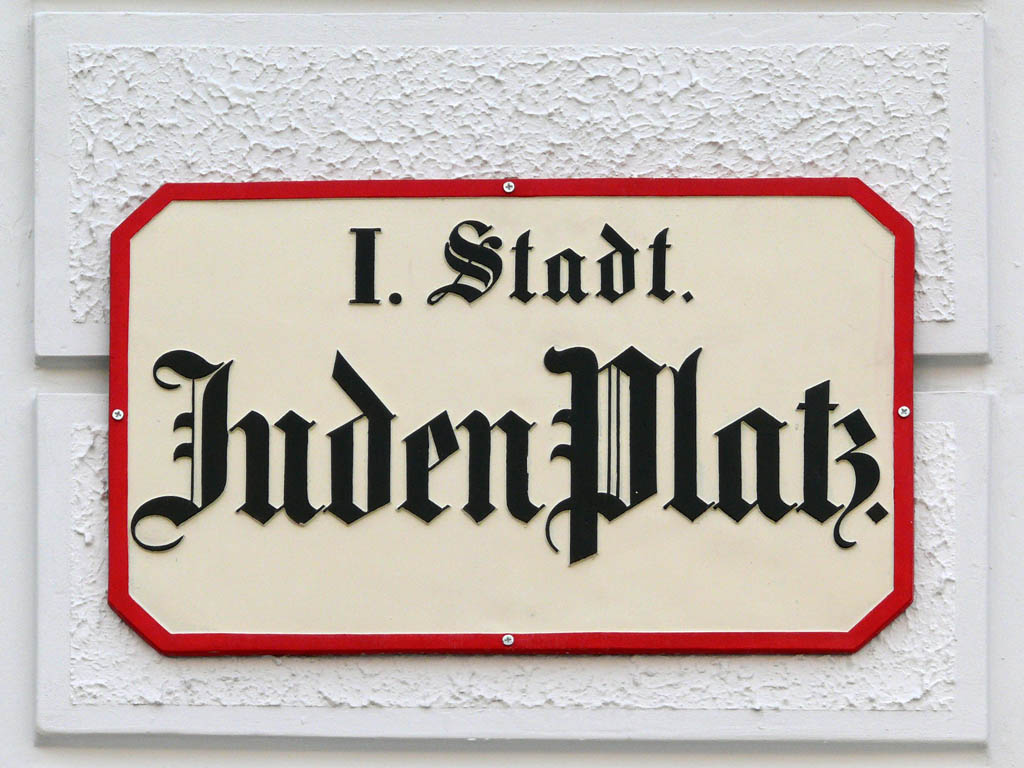
Street sign

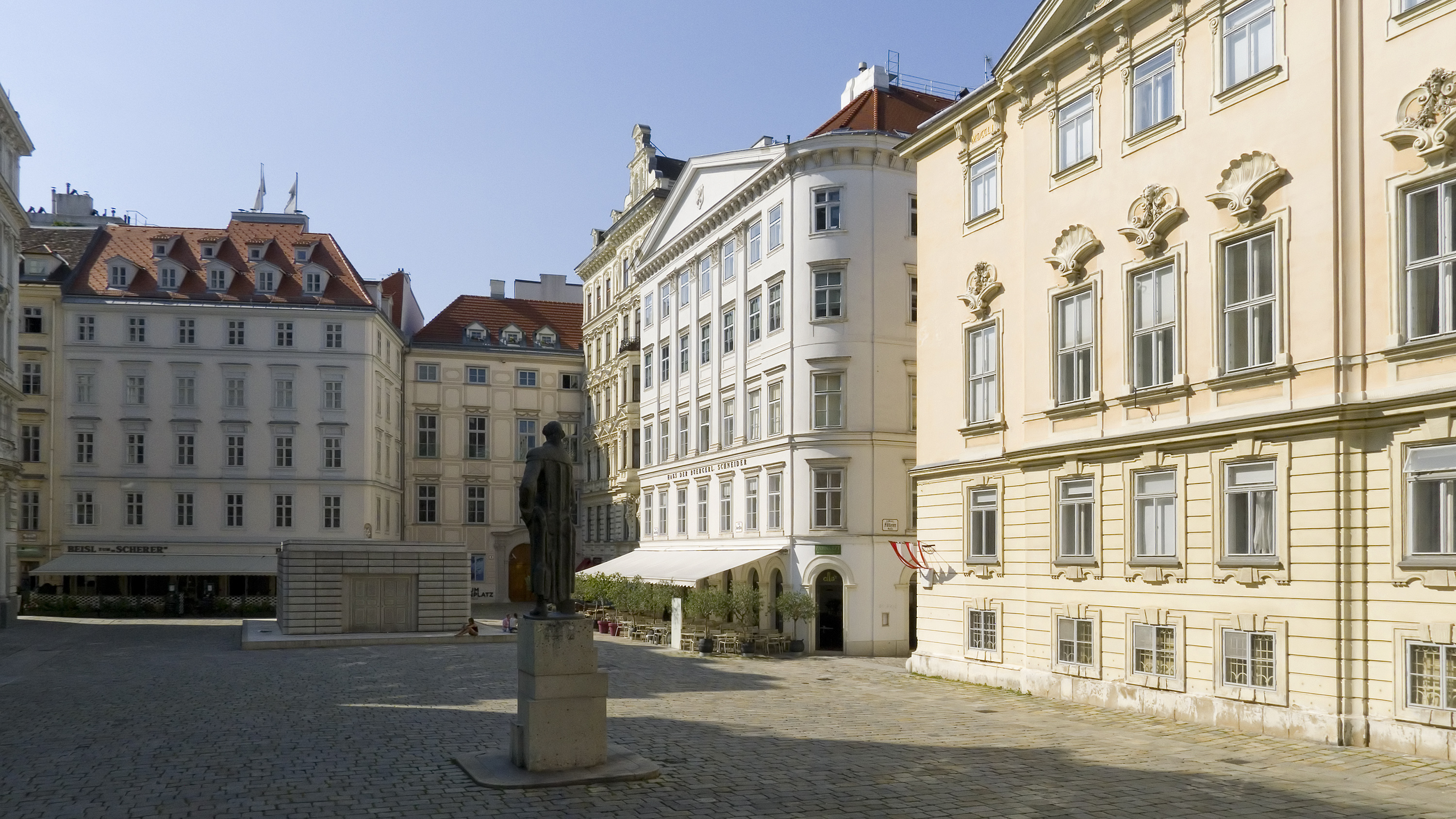
View of the square

Judenplatz (German, "Jewish Square") is a square in Vienna's Innere Stadt that was the center of Jewish life in the city in the Middle Ages. It is located in the immediate proximity of Am Hof square, Schulhof, and Wipplingerstraße. It exemplifies the long and eventful history of the city and the Jewish community focused on this place. Archaeological excavations of the medieval synagogue are viewable underground by way of the museum on the square, Misrachi-Haus. Two sculptural works, a carved relief and several inscribed texts are located around the square that all have subject matter relating to Jewish history. One of these sculptures is a statue of Gotthold Ephraim Lessing. The other is a memorial to Austrian Holocaust Victims, a project based on an idea of Simon Wiesenthal and unveiled in 2000. Created by British artist Rachel Whiteread, the memorial is a reinforced concrete cube resembling a library with its volumes turned inside out.

The Austrian Supreme Administrative Court has its seat on the square.

== History ==
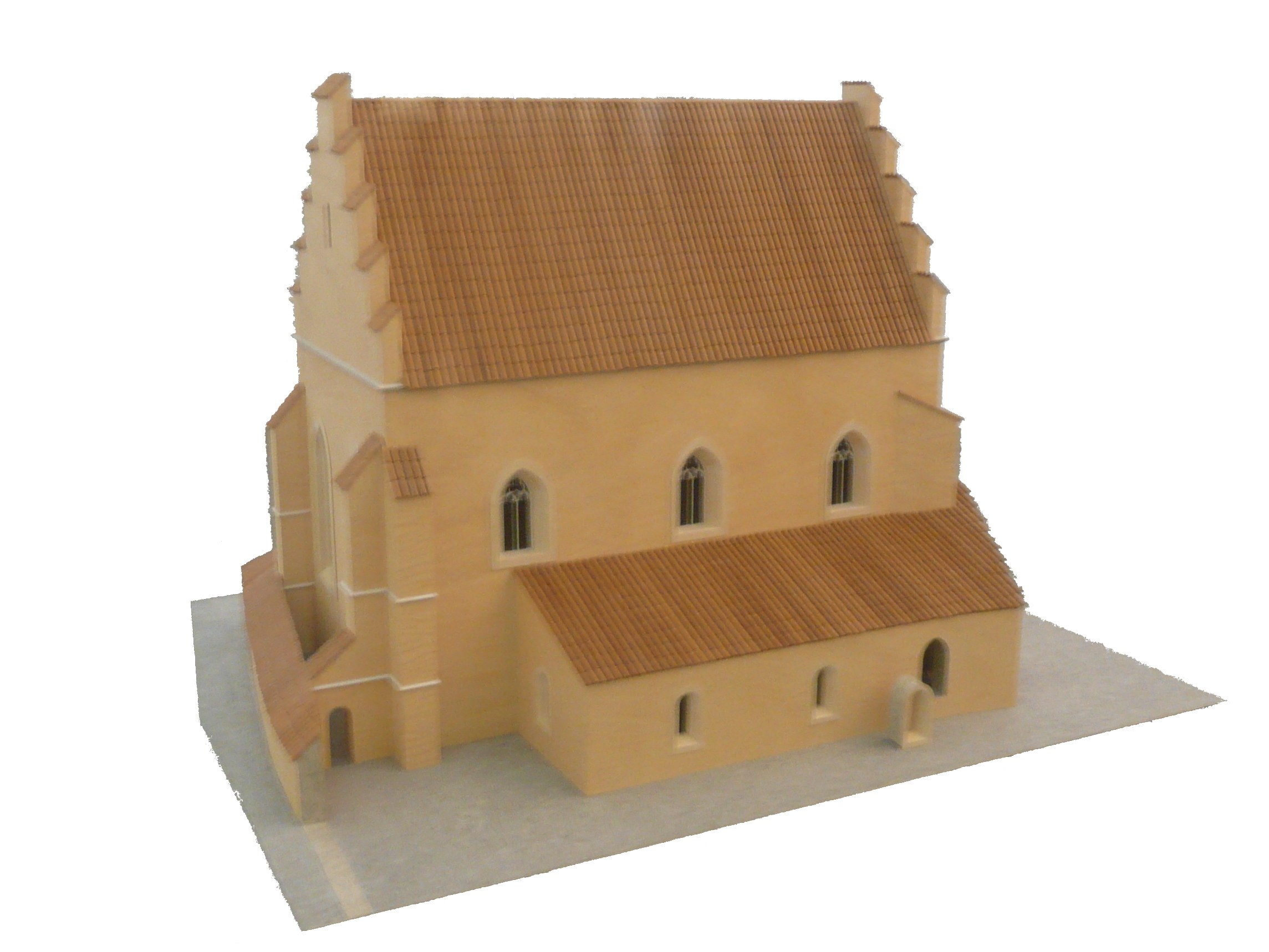
Model of the synagogue at Judenplatz

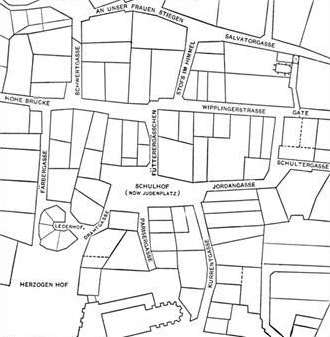
Map of Vienna's Jewish quarter in the early 20th century

Jews began settling in Vienna and in the area that was to become Judenplatz around 1150, coinciding with the settlement of the House of Babenberg. The first written mention named the area "Schulhof" in 1294, a name which lasted until the pogrom of 1421. By the year 1400, 800 inhabitants lived here including merchants, bankers, and scholars. The Jewish city extended north up to the church Maria am Gestade, the west side became Tiefer Graben street, the east side was bounded by Tuchlaubenstreet, and the south side formed the square "Am Hof". The Ghetto possessed 70 houses, which were arranged so that their back walls formed a closed delimitation wall. The Ghetto could be entered by four gates, the two main entrances lay on the Wipplingerstrasse.

At Judenplatz was the Jewish hospital, the synagogue, the bath house, the house of the Rabbi and the Jewish school – all among the most important in German speaking countries. The synagogue lay between the later Jordangasse and Kurrentgasse streets. Because of the school the square bore the name "Schulhof" as it was a schoolyard at that time. Later this name was transferred to a smaller square situated in the immediate neighborhood, and the neighborhood is still called so today. The designation "Neuer Platz" was given to the original schoolyard in 1423, and since 1437 it has been called Judenplatz.

== Vienna Gesera ==
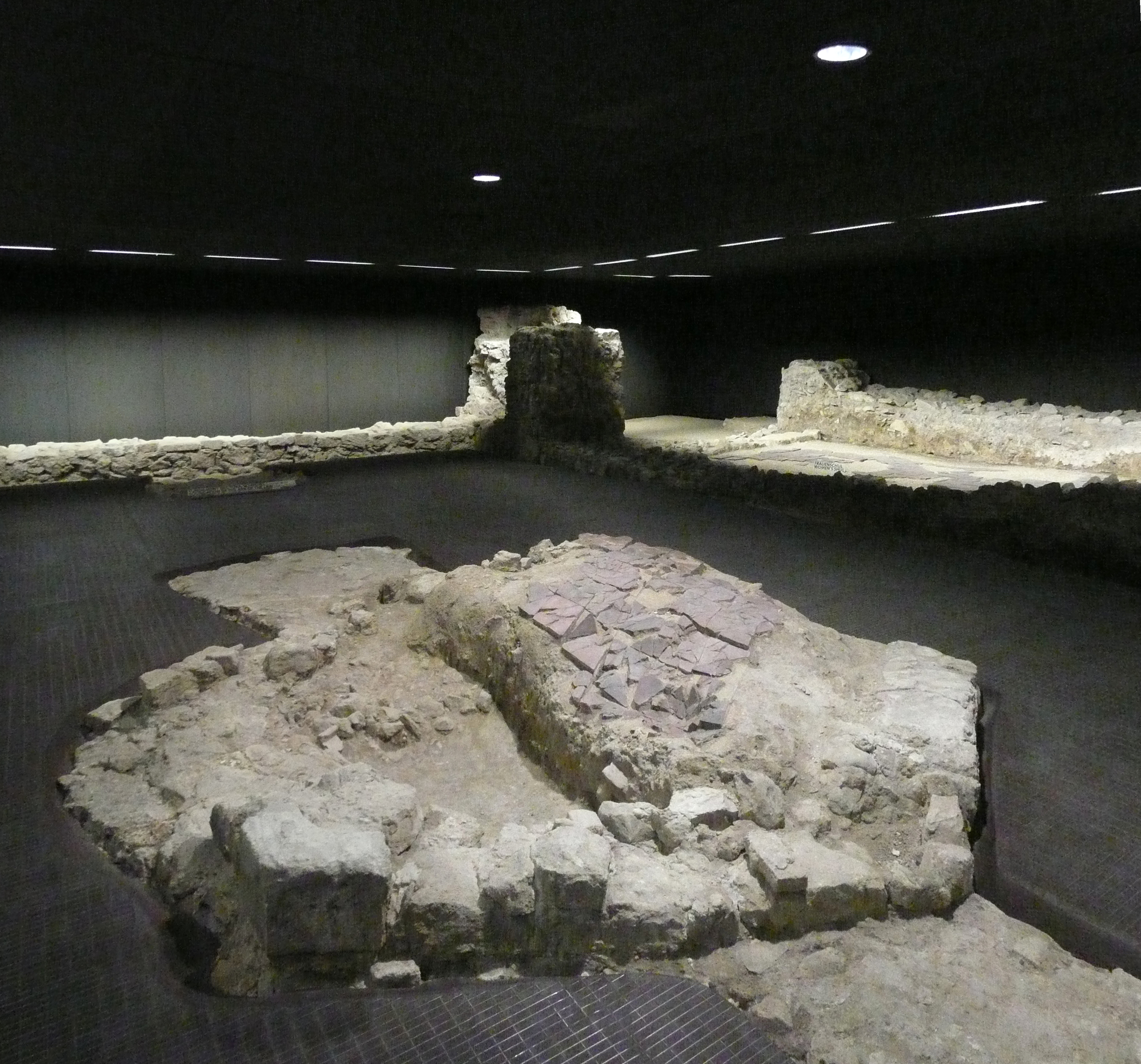
Excavated remains of the synagogue, destroyed in the Vienna Gesera of 1421, located beneath the Holocaust monument

In Vienna under Duke Albrecht V, the persecution of the Jews in the autumn of 1420 grew to a bloody climax in 1421. In the beginning were many imprisonments, with starvations and tortures leading to executions. Children were deprived and deceived into eating unclean foods, those that were defiant were "sold into slavery" or baptized against their will. The poor Jews were driven out, while the wealthy were imprisoned. The few Jews still living in freedom took refuge in the Or-Sarua Synagoge at Judenplatz, in what would become a three-day siege, through hunger and thirst, leading to a collective suicide, A contemporary chronicle exists, entitled the "Wiener Geserah", translated from German and Hebrew as the "Viennese Decree". It reported that the Rabbi Jonah set the Synagogue on fire for the Jews at Or-Sarua to die as martyrs. This was a form of Kiddush Hashem in order to escape religious persecution and compulsory baptism.

At the command of Duke Albrecht V, the approximately two hundred remaining survivors of the Jewish community were accused of crimes such as dealing arms to the Hussites and host desecration and on 12 March 1421 were led to the pyre at the so-called goose pasture (Gänseweide) in Erdberg and burned alive. The Duke decided at that time that no more Jews would be allowed in Austria henceforth. The properties that were left behind were confiscated, the houses were sold or given away, and the stones of the synagogue were taken for the building of the old Viennese university. However, Jewish settlement in Vienna would not cease as the Duke intended, and a second major ghetto would emerge in Vienna's Leopoldstadt district in the seventeenth century.

== Holocaust Memorial ==
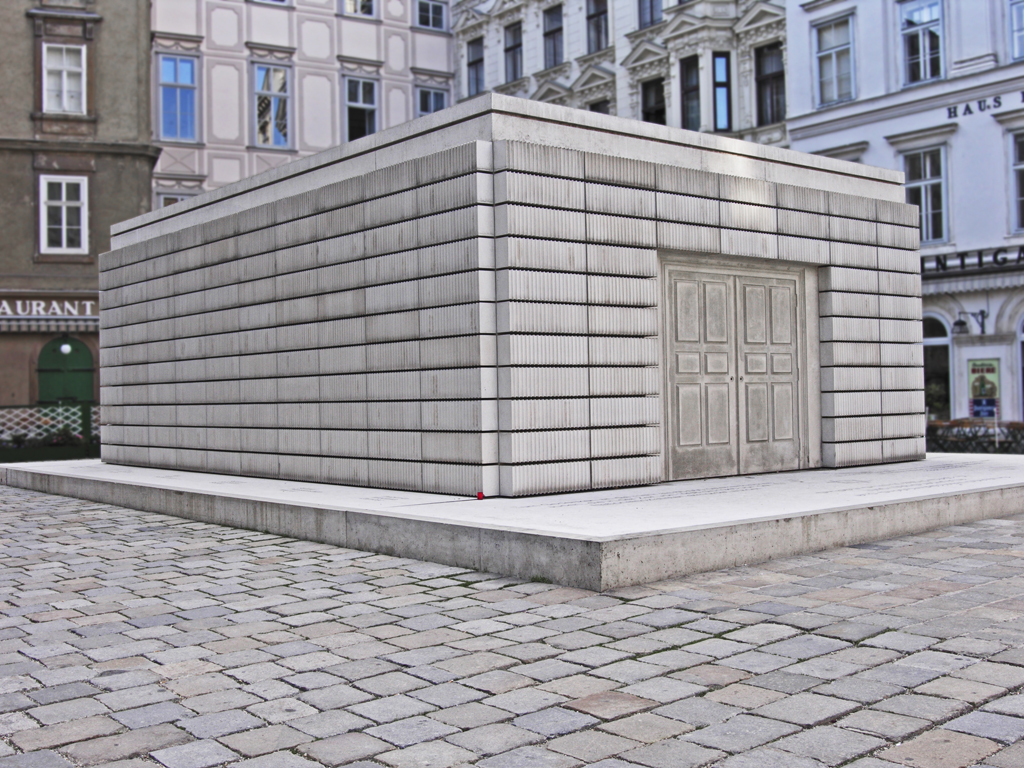
The Holocaust memorial

In the middle of the northern end of the square, the Judenplatz Holocaust Memorial stands for the Austrian Jewish victims of the Shoah, made by the English artist Rachel Whiteread. It consists of a 10 by 7 metre block that is 3.8 metres tall. It is located in the northwestern end of the square before the Misrachi-Haus and faces the Lessing Monument in the southeast, with its walls parallel to the length of the square. The memorial is site-specific in many ways and is therefore dependent on the setting of Judenplatz. One facet of this site-specificity is that it was designed at a domestic scale. It was imagined as if one of the surrounding buildings had a room cast inside out and placed in public in the middle of the square. The walls of the memorial resemble library walls of petrified books. However, the spines of the books on the walls are not legible; they all are turned inwards. On a concrete plinth, the names of the 41 places at which Austrian Jews went to their death during Nazi rule are written. Although this "nameless" library has a symbolic entrance, it is not accessible. The memorial stands in close relation with the exhibition of the Holocaust that is installed in the neighboring Misrachi-Haus, where the names and data of 65,000 murdered Austrian Jews are documented and accessible through computer terminals.

Excavations were undertaken to establish the memorial from July 1995 to November 1998; these are considered the most important urban archaeological investigations in Vienna. Uncovered on the eastern half of the square were quarrystone walls, a well and cellars of a whole block from the time of a medieval synagogue. Controversy arose over the placing of the memorial over the archaeological excavations, which resulted in moving the memorial one meter from its original position on the site. The complete reorganization of the square and its transformation to a pedestrian plaza were completed in the autumn of 2000 with the inauguration of the Holocaust memorial.

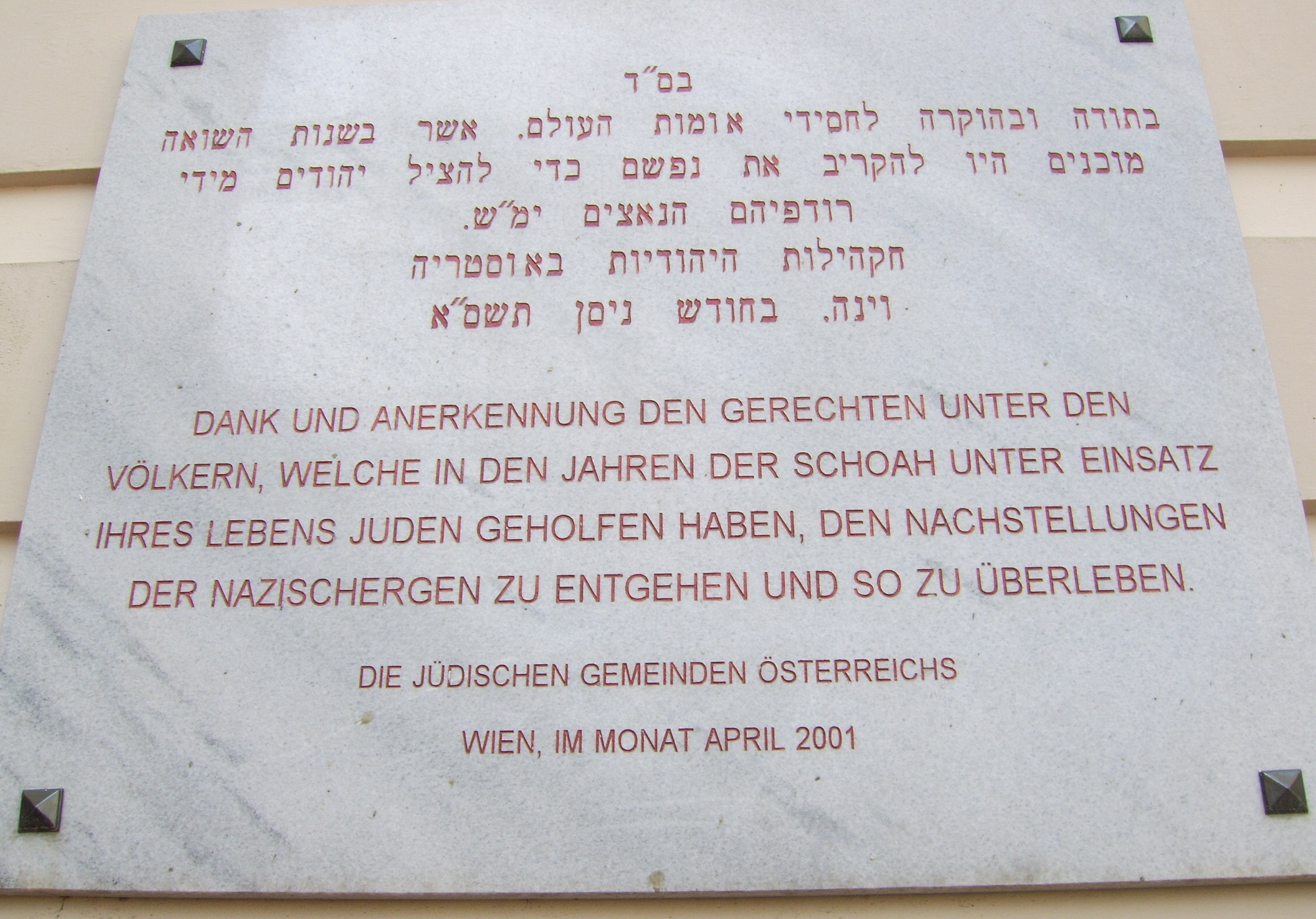
A memorial plaque on the outside of Misrachi-Haus reads: Thanks and acknowledgment to the just among the people, who in the years of the Shoah risked their lives to help Jews, persecuted by the Nazi henchmen, to escape and survive. The Austrian Jewish community, Vienna, in the month of April 2001.

== Misrachi-Haus ==
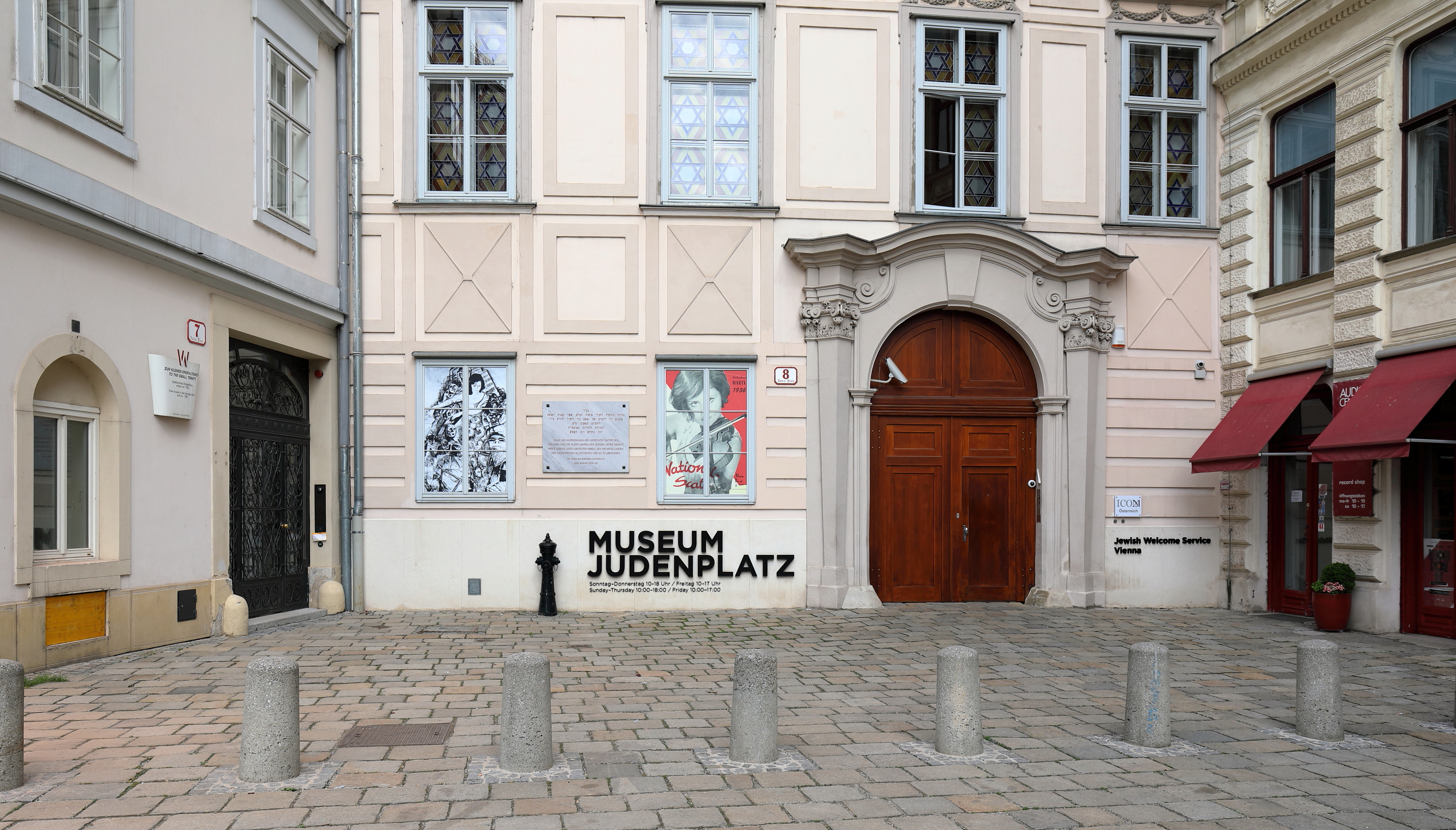
Jewish Museum at Judenplatz

At Judenplatz 8 is the Misrachi-Haus. It was built in 1694 and is today a branch of the Jewish Museum Vienna. Under the square archaeologists found, in 1995, the foundation walls of one of Europe's biggest medieval synagogues and exposed them. With the archaeological findings came the idea to unite the memorial and excavations into a commemorative museum complex.

The erection of a museum sector in the Misrachi-Haus was conceived in 1997 to supplement the show area at Judenplatz 8. In addition to the archaeological findings, exhibitions by a branch of the Jewish Museum Vienna would document Jewish life in the Middle Ages as well as the data base produced by the Documentation Archive of the Austrian Resistance with the names and fates of Austrian Holocaust victims.

In the exhibition, importance is particularly attached to the circumstances of the Jews in "Wiener Geserah", the pogrom in the year 1421. Remains of the synagogue from before the pogrom are to be seen in three areas; these consist of the men's teaching and praying area called the "men's shul", a cultivated smaller area that was used by the women, and the foundation of the hexagonal bimah, the elevated platform for Torah reading.

== Lessing monument ==
In the center of the southern end of the square is the monument to the German poet Gotthold Ephraim Lessing created by Siegfried Charoux (1896-1967). Charoux won the commission in 1930 in a competition with eighty two other sculptors. The monument was completed in 1931/32, unveiled in 1935, and soon removed in 1939 by the National Socialists to be melted down for the purpose of making weaponry. Lessing was in Vienna in 1775/76, had an audience with Joseph II., and was therefore in a position to influence and shape the Viennese cultural climate. Lessing's "Ringparabel" in the drama "Nathan der Weise" is considered a key text of the Enlightenment and helped in the formulation of the idea of tolerance. From 1962 to 65, Charoux created a second Lessing monument out of bronze, that was unveiled at Ruprechtskirche in 1968 and moved to Judenplatz in 1981. This is the monument that stands on the square today.

== Bohemian Court Chancellery ==
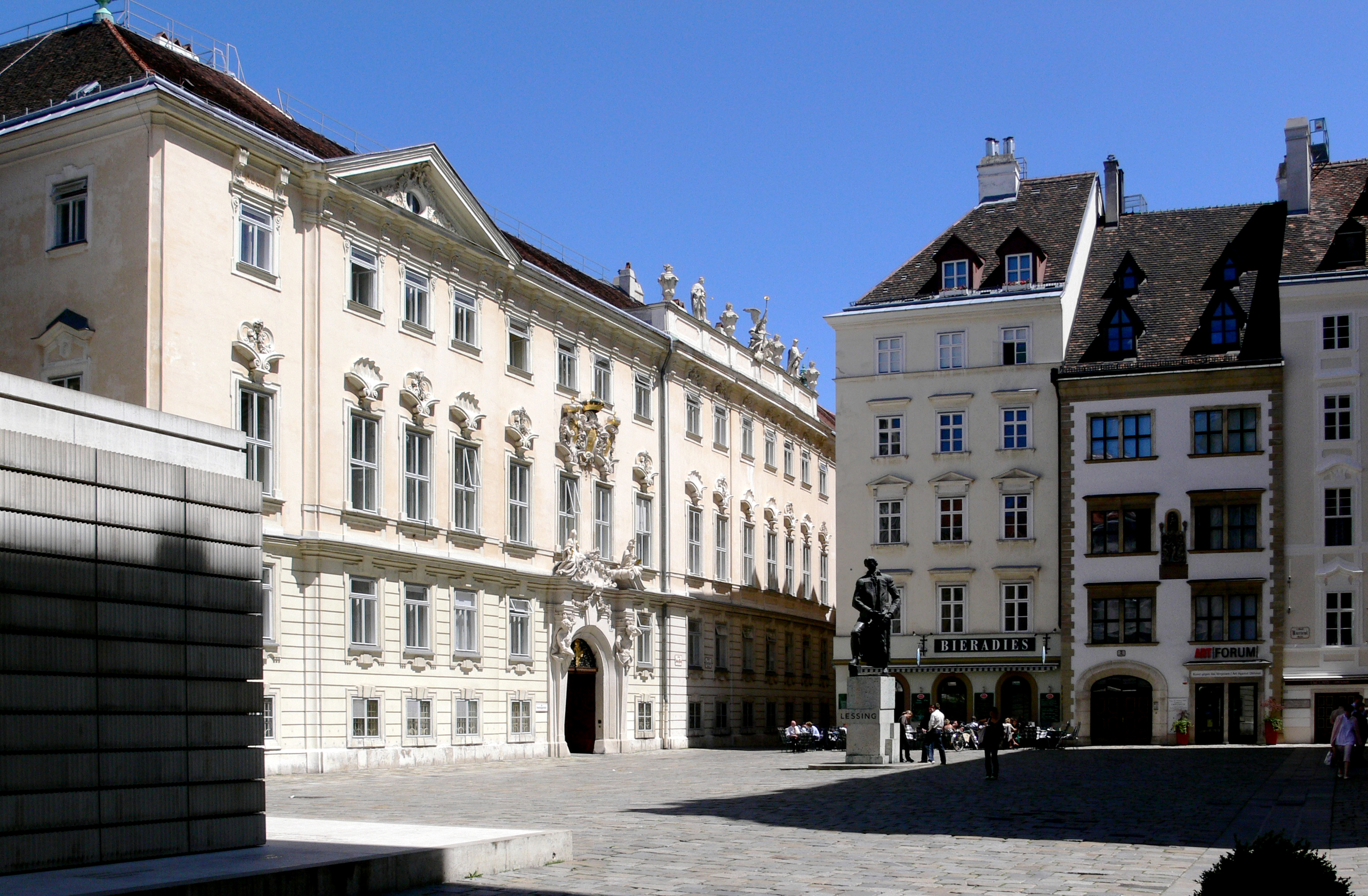
The Bohemian Chancellery, by Johann Bernhard Fischer von Erlach, with the Lessing monument in the lower right

The former Bohemian Court Chancellery (Böhmische Hofkanzlei), Judenplatz 11, is the seat of the Austrian Supreme Administrative Court (Verwaltungsgerichtshof). The building was erected from 1709 to 1714 to the designs of Johann Bernhard Fischer von Erlach. After 1749, the remaining lots of the block were bought up and Matthias Gerl was put in charge of the expansion of the palace from 1751 to 1754, symmetrically doubling the construction westward. Further rebuilding took place in the 19th century, the palace essentially received its present-day look at that time. The façade on Judenplatz was originally the back of the building, only since changes in the 20th century has the main entrance gate been found there. The female figures over the gates of this building represent the Cardinal virtues (moderation, wisdom, justice and bravery), and above are the coats of arms of Bohemia and Austria. In the middle of the attic line, an angel stands with trombone, at whose feet a Putto crouches. Four vases and two male figures who are presumably Bohemian Kings Wenceslaus I and Wenceslaus II are at the angel's sides.

The building was originally the official seat of the Bohemian Court Chancellery, which was united organizationally with the Austrian Court Chancellery in 1749. In 1848, occupancy changed to the Ministry of the Interior which remained in the palace until 1923. From 1761 to 82 and 1797 to 1840 resided also the Oberste Justizstelle, the forerunner of the Austrian Supreme Court (Oberster Gerichtshof). In 1936, the Bundesgerichtshof moved into the palace, and on 12 March 1945 a part of the building was destroyed by a bomb strike. The rebuilding was under the management of the architect Erich Boltenstern and was completed in 1951. From 1946 to 2014, the palace was the seat of both the Supreme Administrative Court and the Constitutional Court; in 2014, the Constitutional Court moved to the Freyung.
