= Vienna Gesera =

15th century Austrian Jewish pogrom

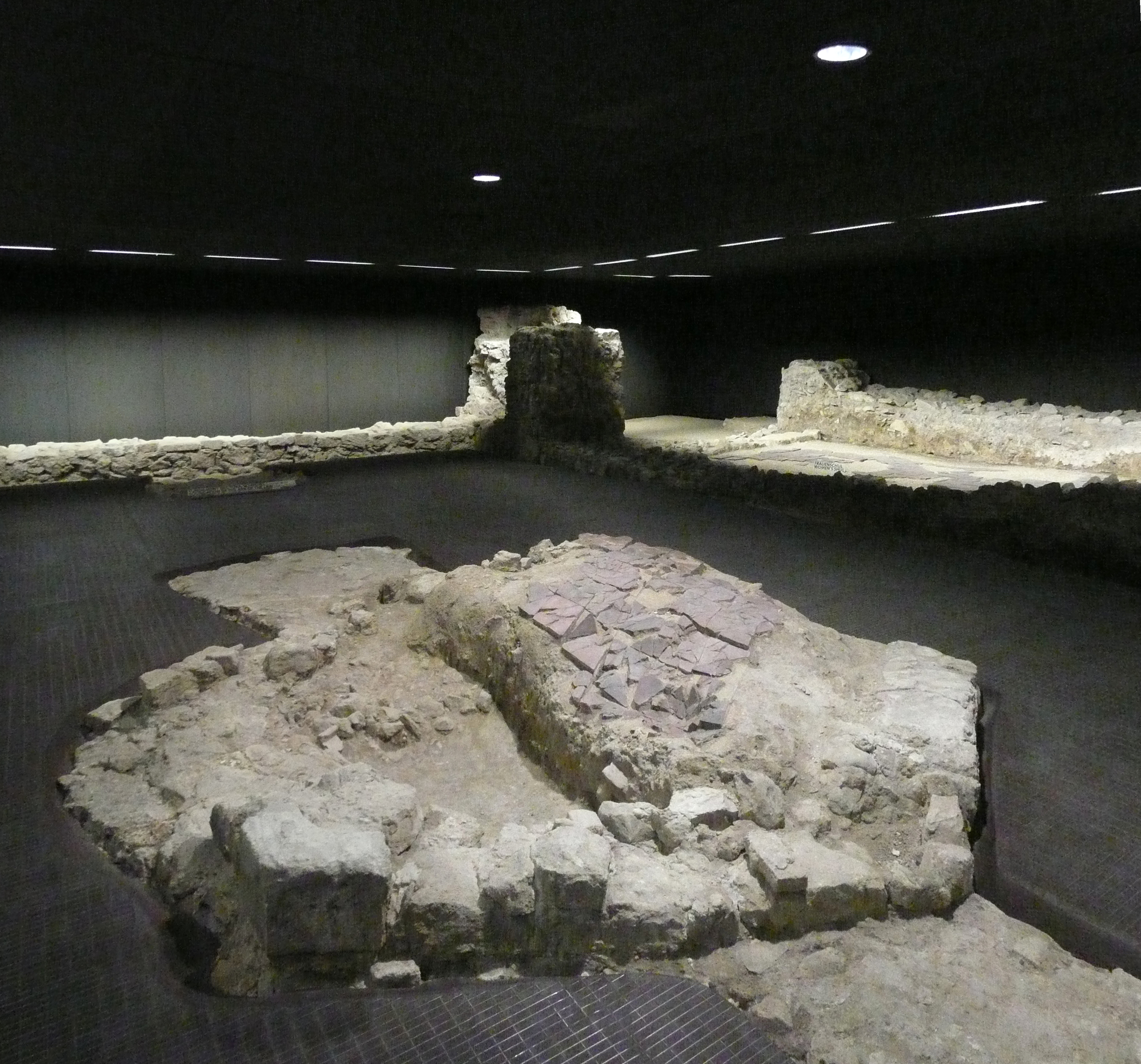
Excavated remains of the synagogue, destroyed in the Geserah of 1421, located beneath the Holocaust monument

The Vienna Gesera (German: Wiener Gesera, Yiddish: Wiener Gzeyre, Hebrew: גזרת וינה, romanized: Gezerat Wina, meaning "Viennese Decree") was a major anti-Jewish persecution of Jews in Austria between 1420 and 1421, ordered by Duke Albert V. This event is considered one of the largest Jewish pogroms in medieval Central Europe. The persecution led to the effective cessation of the Viennese Jewish community, with its members facing forced conversion, expulsion, imprisonment, and ultimately, the execution of over 200 Jews. Some Jews managed to escape, while others committed suicide. The name of the event comes from a contemporary Jewish chronicle titled Wiener Gesera.

== Background ==
During the 15th century, the attitude towards Jews in the Holy Roman Empire became stricter, both from ecclesiastical and secular authorities. While existing papal protection provisions, which, for instance, prohibited forced conversion of Jews to Christianity, were maintained, an intensified anti-Jewish discourse by church authors spread through sermons, fueling hatred among the Christian population. Concurrently, secular protection for Jews weakened. The original imperial protection of Jews had largely devolved into merely viewing them as a source of income. As the economic significance of the Jewish population declined due to increasing burdens, princely protection further diminished. Unlike earlier decades, persecutions often occurred with the toleration or even participation of the Jews' protectors. Alongside persecution, targeted expulsions from cities or entire territories became more frequent.

Prior to Duke Albert V's actions, the Habsburg dukes had not shown an active interest in the conversion and baptism of Jews, despite ongoing theological debates at the University of Vienna. Their policy, known as "Judenschutz" (protection of the Jews), was generally vigorously implemented and largely prevented plague-related persecutions in the Duchy of Austria. However, there was considerable economic pressure on the Jewish community from the mid-14th century onwards.

== Causes and Motivations ==
The causes of the Vienna Geserah are complex and have been extensively debated by historians, with most scholars pointing to an interplay of economic, religious, and political factors.

=== Financial Motivation ===
A primary driver for Duke Albert V was financial gain. He needed substantial funds for his marriage to Elizabeth of Luxembourg and to finance his anti-Hussite crusades. The marriage negotiations, contractually settled on September 28, 1421, and the wedding in Vienna on May 3, 1422, involved significant financial commitments. The confiscation of Jewish wealth, including money, jewels, silver, and debt certificates, provided a substantial, though possibly short-term, financial gain for the Duke. Some historians argue that the main motivation lay precisely in the fiscal area, interpreting the impact of the Gesera on Albert's finances as the logical conclusion.

=== Religious Fanaticism and Anti-Jewish Discourse ===
There was a strong anti-Jewish atmosphere among scholars at the University of Vienna. Theological discussions, particularly concerning forced conversions, played a role in shaping hostile attitudes. The theologians also discussed the perceived excessive number of Jews, their "luxurious lifestyle," and their "abominable books" (likely referring to the Talmud).

=== Allegations of Hussite Collaboration ===
Accusations that Jews were collaborating with the Hussites were discussed by the theological faculty of the University of Vienna on June 9, 1419. This alleged "confederation of Jews and Hussites" served as a political pretext for the persecution, although its factual basis is questioned.

=== Ritual Murder and Host Desecration Libels ===
While debated as a primary cause, accusations of host desecration (the alleged defiling of consecrated Eucharistic wafers by Jews) and ritual murder (the murder of Christian children for religious purposes) were part of the anti-Jewish narrative. The "Mesnerin" (sacristan) of Enns was accused of host desecration and confessed under duress.

== The Events of 1420-1421 ==
The expulsions, forced conversions, and executions ordered by Duke Albert V led to Austria being described as "blood country" in 15th century rabbinical literature. In the beginning were many imprisonments, with starvations and tortures leading to executions. Children were deprived and deceived into eating unclean foods, those that were defiant were "sold into slavery" or baptized against their will. The poor Jews were driven out, while the wealthy were imprisoned. The few Jews still living in freedom took refuge in the Or-Sarua Synagoge at Judenplatz, in what would become a three-day siege, through hunger and thirst, leading to a collective suicide. The contemporary Jewish chronicle reports that the Rabbi Jonah set the Synagogue on fire for the Jews at Or-Sarua to die as martyrs. This was a form of Kiddush Hashem in order to escape religious persecution and compulsory baptism. At the instigation of the Italian rabbinate, Pope Martin V condemned the forced conversion of Jews with threats of excommunication. His intervention, however, was ineffective.

At the command of Duke Albert V, the approximately two hundred remaining survivors of the Jewish community were accused of crimes such as dealing arms to the Hussites and host desecration, and on 12 March 1421 were led to the pyre at the so-called goose pasture (Gänseweide) in Erdberg and burned alive. The duke decided at that time that no more Jews would be allowed in Austria henceforth. The properties that were left behind were confiscated, the houses were sold or given away, and the stones of the synagogue were taken for the building of the old Viennese university. However, Jewish settlement in Vienna would not permanently cease. A second major ghetto would emerge in what was to become Vienna's Leopoldstadt district in the seventeenth century.

The Second Vienna Gesera was ordered by Leopold I, Holy Roman Emperor and his wife Margaret Theresa of Spain in 1670.
