= Alfred Hrdlicka =

Austrian sculptor (1928–2009)

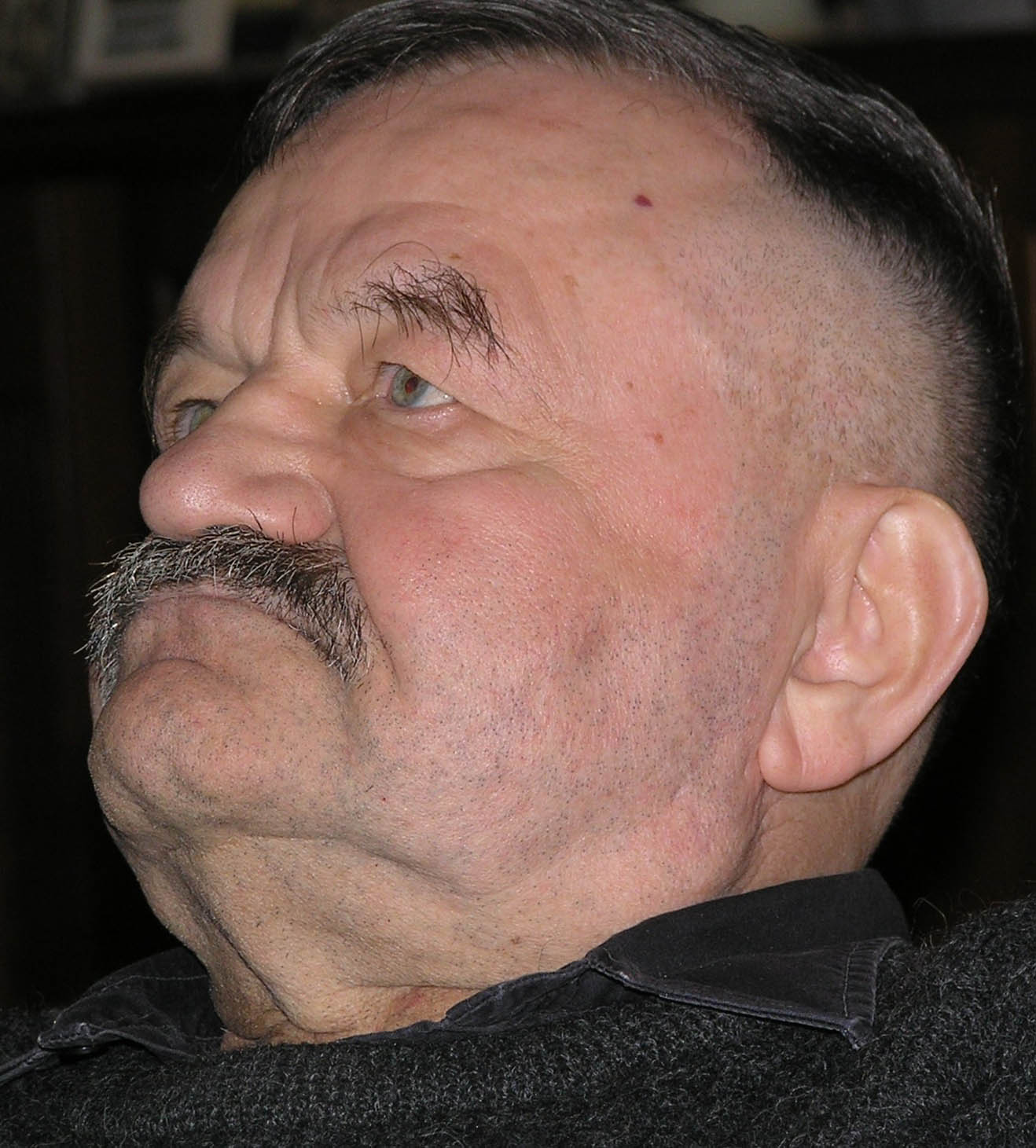
- Alfred Hrdlicka (2005)

Alfred Hrdlicka (German pronunciation: [ˌalfʁeːt ˈhʁdlɪtʃka]; 27 February 1928 – 5 December 2009) was an Austrian sculptor, painter, and professor. His surname is sometimes written Hrdlička.

He was born in Vienna into the family of a Czech communist and trade unionist. After learning to be a dental technician from 1943 to 1945, Hrdlicka studied painting until 1952 at the Akademie der bildenden Künste under Albert Paris Gütersloh and Josef Dobrowsky. Afterwards he studied sculpture until 1957 under Fritz Wotruba. In 1960 he had his first exhibition in Vienna; in 1964 he attained international attention as a representative of Austria at the Venice Biennale, Italy.

In 2008, his new religious work about the Apostles, Religion, Flesh and Power, attracted criticism about its homoerotic theme. The exhibition was housed in the museum of the St. Stephen's Cathedral of Vienna. He taught many sculptors, such as Hans Sailer, Angela Laich and others.

== Works (selection) ==
- Roll over Mondrian. Etching, 1967.
- Friedrich Engels Monument in Wuppertal, 1981.
- Gegendenkmal at the Stephansplatz in Hamburg, 1985–86.
- Mahnmal gegen Krieg und Faschismus (Memorial against War and Fascism) on the Albertinaplatz in Vienna. Sculpture, 1988–91.

== Exhibitions (selection) ==
- 1960: Wiener-Kunsthalle, Zedlitzgasse, Vienna (with Fritz Martinz)
- 1962: Künstlerhaus, Französischer Saal, Vienna (with Fritz Martinz)
- 1963: Ausstellungspavillon Zwerglgarten, Salzburg (organized by Galerie Welz)
- 1964: 32. Biennale (Venice), with Herbert Boeckl
- 2008: Werkschau in der Kunsthalle Würth (Schwäbisch Hall)
- 2010: Belvedere (Wien): Alfred Hrdlicka. Unsparing!

== Gallery ==
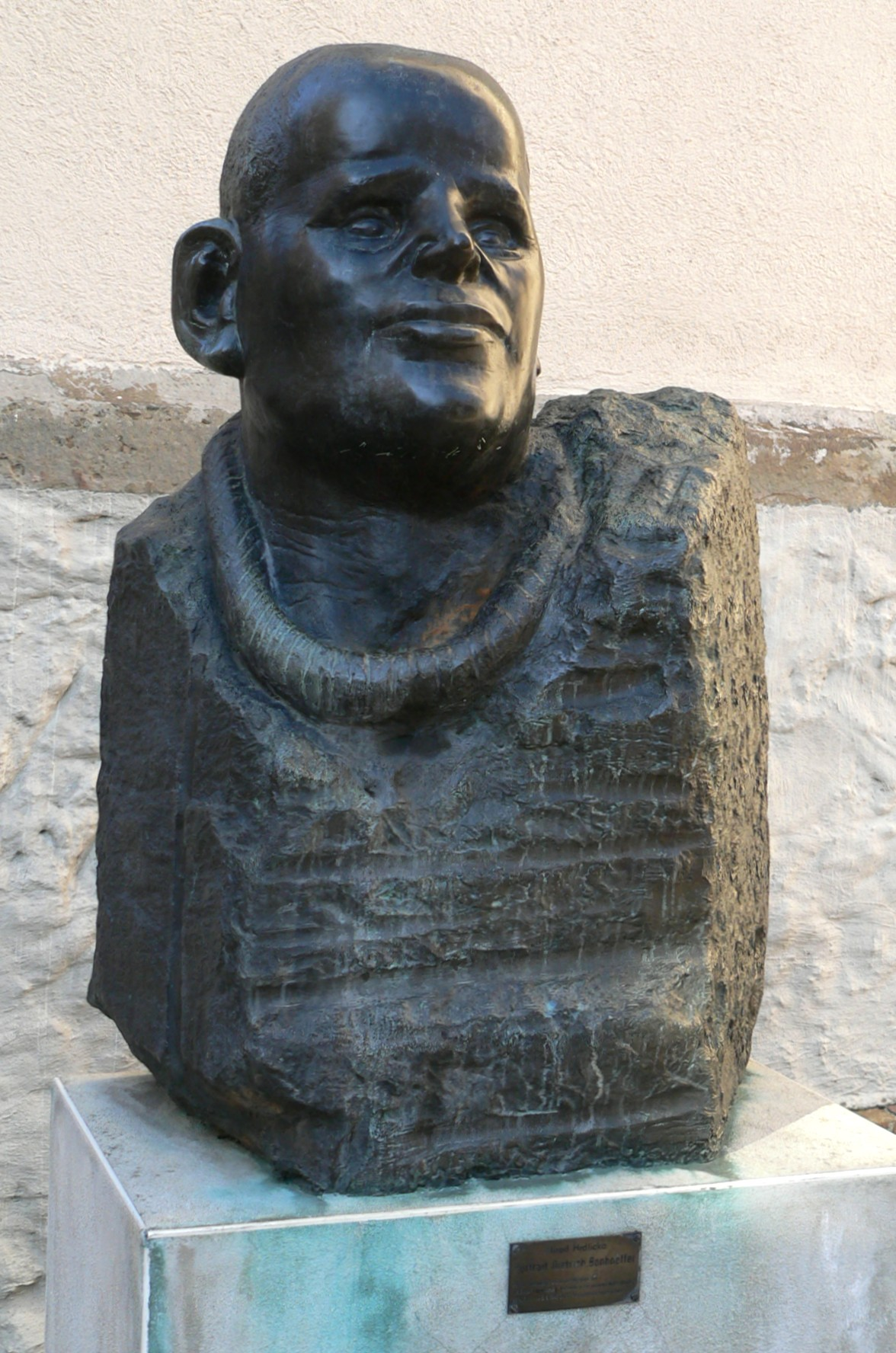
Bronze sculpture of Dietrich Bonhoeffer, at a side entrance of the Stadtkirche church, Germany

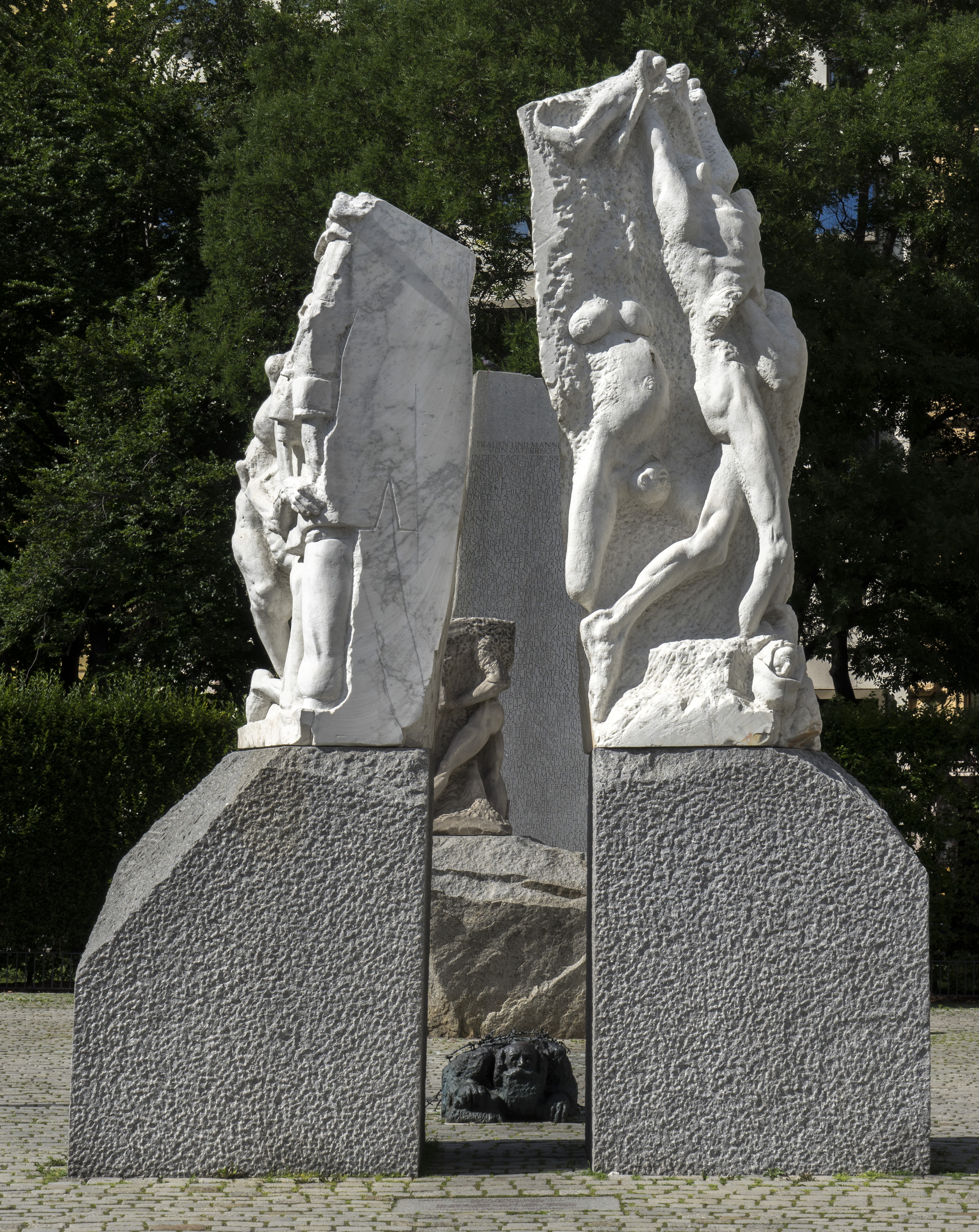
Mahnmal gegen Krieg und Faschismus, Vienna, Albertinaplatz

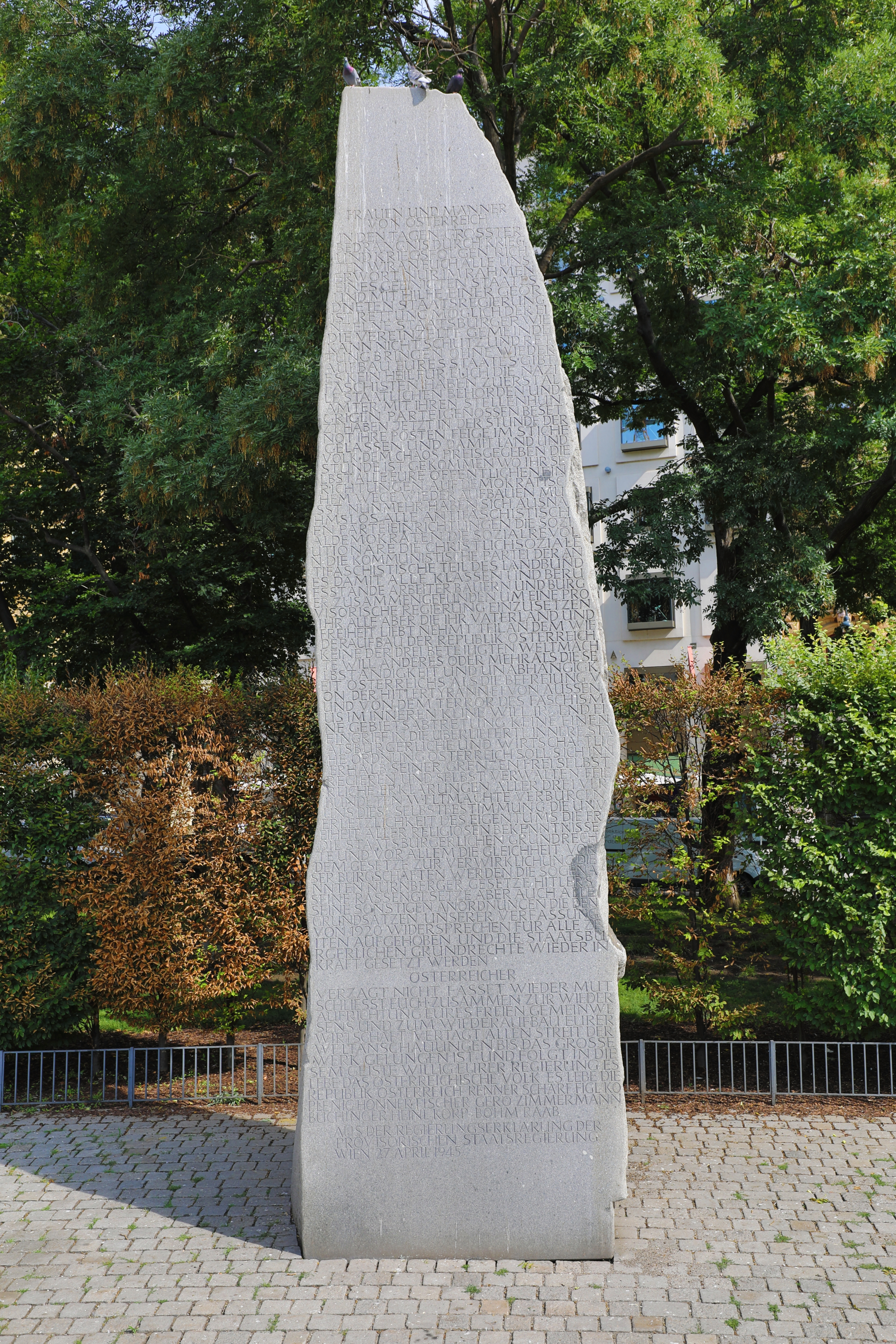
"Stone of the Republic", a part of "Memorial against War and Fascism" in Vienna

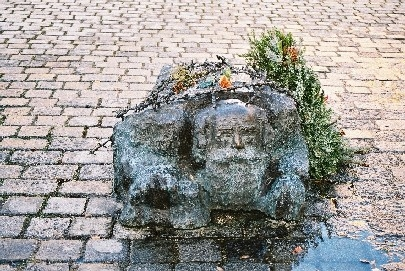
Statue of kneeling Jew, located at the base of the Monument against War and Fascism, Albertinaplatz

== Literature ==
- Wolfgang Kermer: Wiener Blut am Weissenhof: die Stuttgarter Jahre Alfred Hrdlickas. Mit zwei Texten von Alfred Hrdlicka. [Stuttgart]: [Staatliche Akademie der Bildenden Künste Stuttgart], 2008
- Alfred Weidinger: "Alfred Hrdlicka - Parallelwelten. Biografische Notizen 1928–1964." In: Alfred Hrdlicka - Schonungslos!. Bibliothek der Provinz, Weitra 2010, S. 13–56.
- Bettina Secker: Alfred Hrdlicka-Neolithikum, Kindler, Munich, 1984

== Notes ==
Hrdlicka was a talented chess player. In 1953 Austria sent him to participate in the Student World Championship in Brussels.
