= Rhode Island Holocaust Memorial =

Holocaust memorial in Providence, RI

Coordinates: 41°49′30″N 71°24′28″W

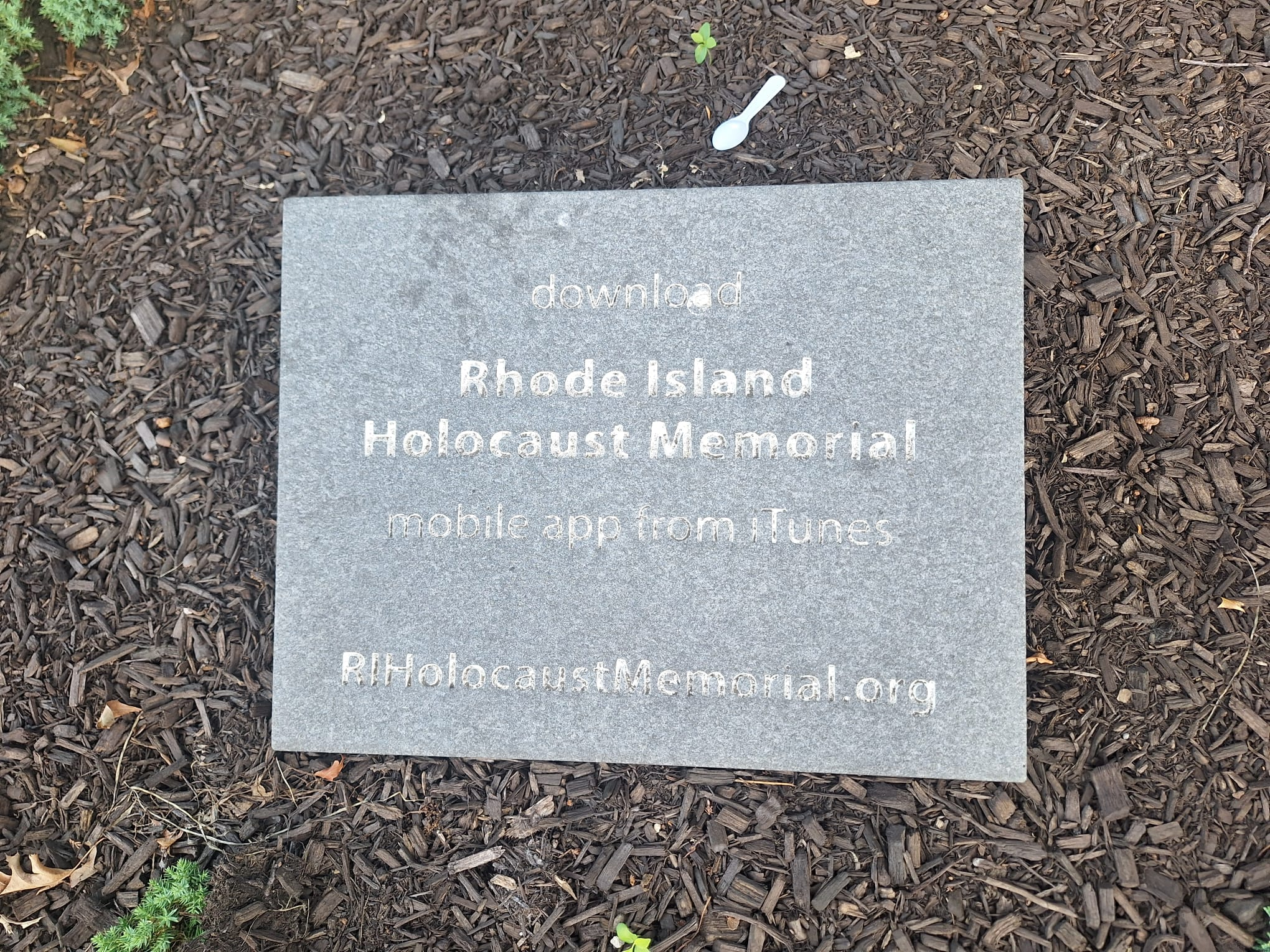
The Plaque

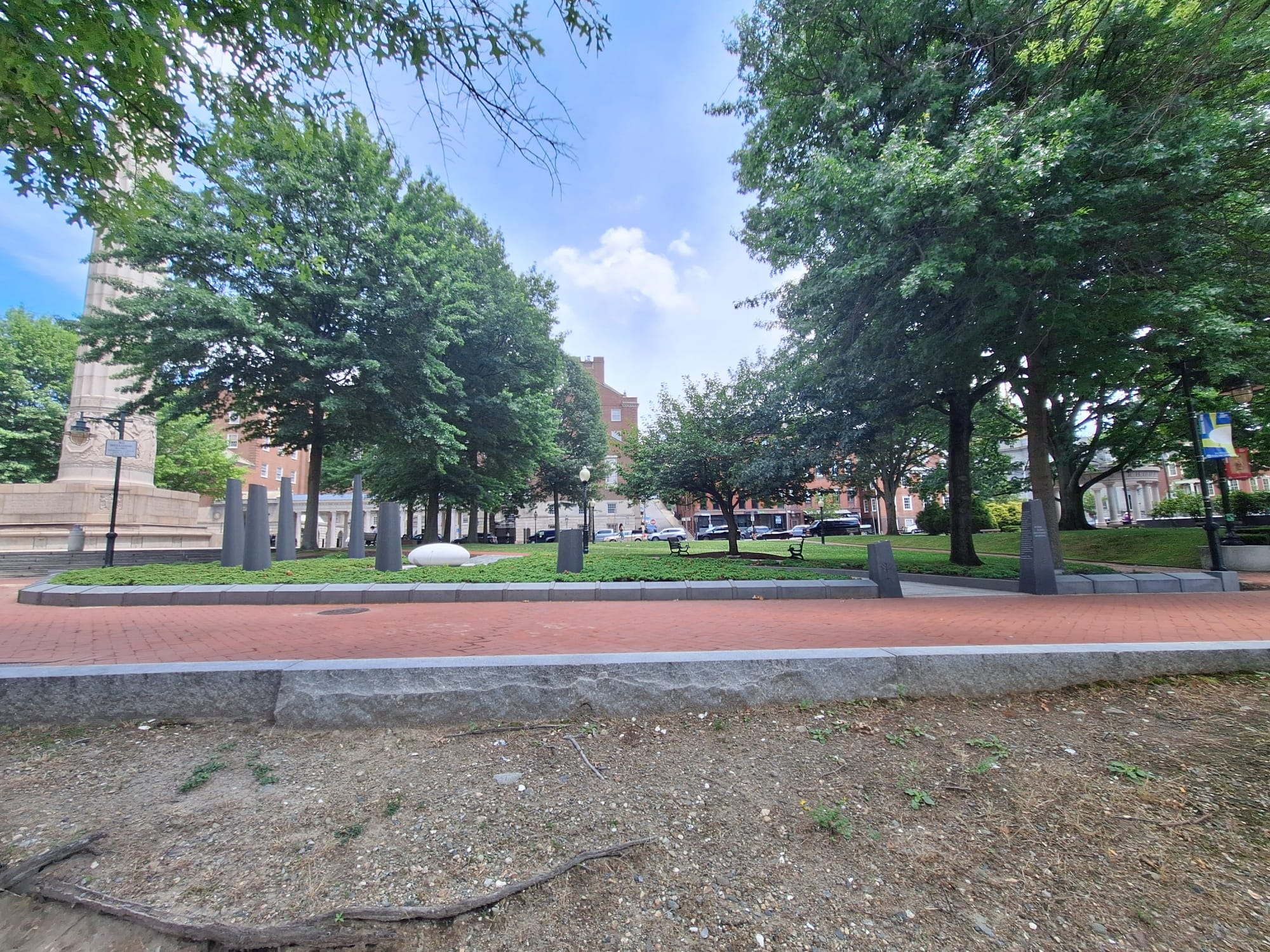
The Holocaust Monument of Rhode-Island - General View

The Rhode Island Holocaust Memorial is a monument located on the east bank of the Providence River in the city of Providence, near the College Hill district, which houses many of Brown University's buildings. The Rhode Island Holocaust Memorial situated between two memorials dedicated to those who perished in the two World Wars: the World War I memorial lies slightly to the south, and the World War II memorial slightly to the north. The memorial commemorates the six million Jews who perished at the hands of the Nazis and honors the survivors who made their way to Rhode Island, where they built new lives, families, and businesses while contributing to the state's cultural fabric.

== Description of the monument ==
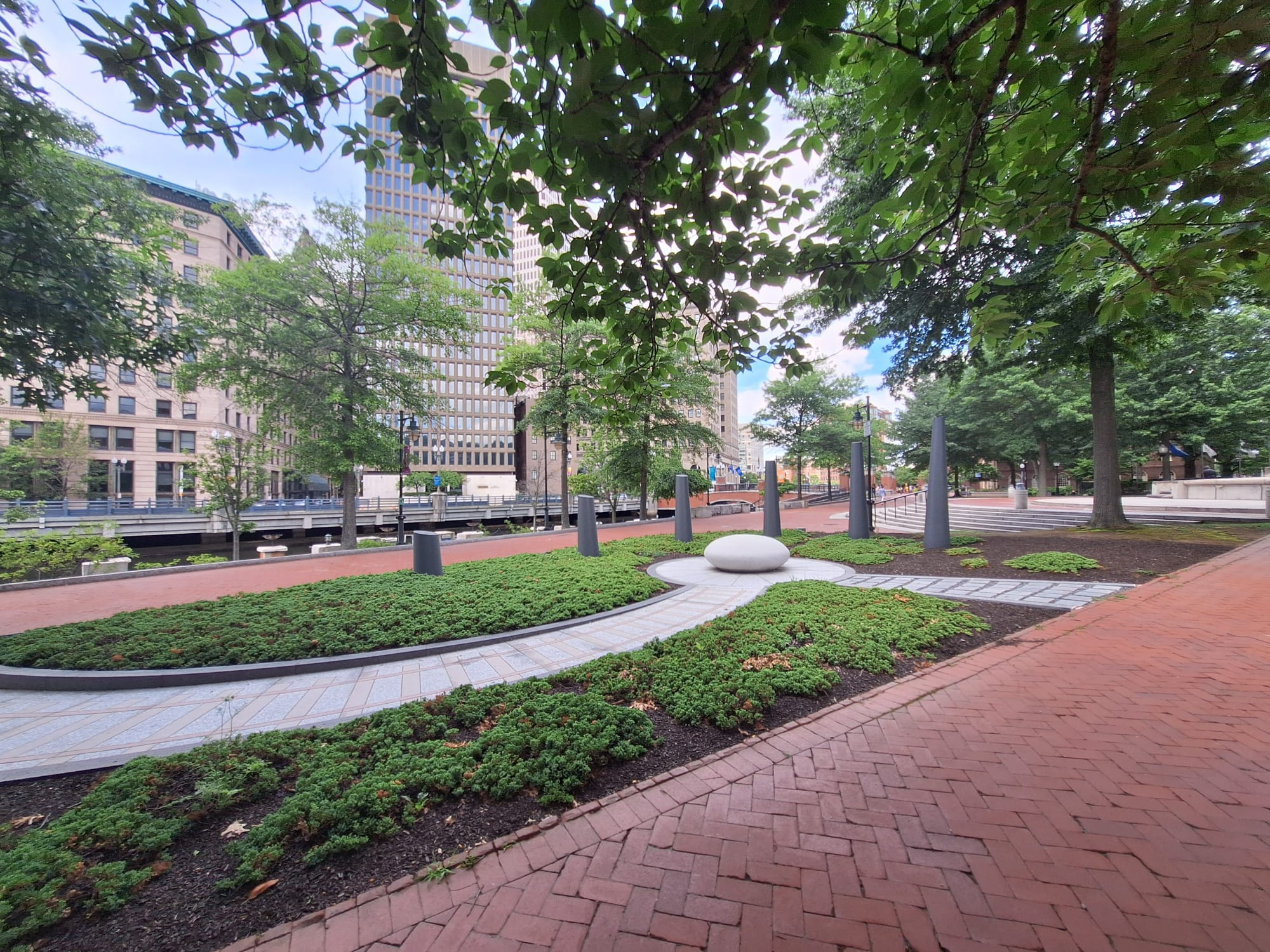
The Six Pillars Representing thS six Million who Perished, and Beside Them, the Rounded Rock of Life.

The Rhode Island Holocaust Memorial consists of six main components: the outer walkway, the entrance gate, the inner walkway, the path, the pillars, and the "Rock of Life". The outer walkway, made of light gray granite, encircles the monument. Inscribed upon it are the names of 15 concentration camps, selected for being the most well-known. The entrance gate is located at the side of the monument. It comprises two semi-rectangular granite pillars, matching the dark gray color of the other pillars, though they differ in size. Both pillars bear detailed inscriptions facing the visitor, calling upon them to fight. Upon passing through the entrance gate, one walks along a path of speckled gray stone featuring a design of faded red railway tracks—evoking the trains used to transport most of the victims to their deaths. As the path continues, the tracks narrow, symbolizing the loss of two-thirds of Europe's Jewish population.

An inner walkway runs along the path. It is embedded with the names of Holocaust survivors who immigrated to Rhode Island after their liberation. Upon reaching the Rock of Life, six memorial pillars stand out. These pillars are made of smooth, dark-gray granite. Varying in size, they are truncated elliptical cones rich in symbolism; their shape represents the smokestacks that carried the ashes of the dead toward the heavens. The six pillars represent the six million Jews who perished, while their varying heights symbolize the diversity of the victims.

The path ends at the "Rock of Life" — a large white stone that stands in striking contrast to the dark stone pillars surrounding it. This rock symbolizes a "memorial stone." In Judaism, it is customary to place a memorial stone on the grave of a loved one as an act of commemoration.

For those with only a passing knowledge of the Holocaust, an app. has been created that provides information on the memorial's creation, the symbolism of its various components, and the Holocaust experience itself, fostering an emotional connection to the memorial's profound beauty. The app. Fulfilled the creators' vision for the memorial: honoring the memory and fostering a thought-provoking experience that helps visitors understand why "Never Again" is such a crucial message — and perhaps inspires them to stand up against hatred. The app. is compatible with all mobile phones and other devices; it can be downloaded from the Apple App. Store or Google Play by searching for "Rhode Island Holocaust Memorial". Designed as an audio experience, it allows visitors to focus on what they see. It also includes a written transcript with numerous images for those who prefer — or may need — to read. As an app., it serves as a learning tool that can be used off-site — in the classroom, at home, or virtually anywhere — to take a virtual tour of the monument. Teacher - led guided tours of the Rhode Island Holocaust Memorial are also available by contacting the Sandra Bornstein Holocaust Education Center.

== The creator and his other works ==
Jonathan Bonner is an American sculptor (born 1947) trained in woodworking, furniture design, and metalwork. In his book "Front Pockets", Bonner focuses on the relationship between a single individual — the smallest possible audience for a work of art — and pairs of objects designed to fit into trouser pockets. Personal items requiring easy access (keys, money, tissues) are typically kept in front pockets. Bonner’s objects — magnets, weights, spheres — relate in some way to everyday use, yet their functionality is absurd. By exhibiting them at the RISD Museum, Bonner reveals what is often concealed and transforms a person's private interaction with objects into a public forum. The Rhode Island Holocaust Memorialwas inaugurated on August 26, 2015.

== See also ==
- Museum of Italian Judaism and the Shoah in Ferrara, Italy
- Shoah Museum (Rome)
- The Holocaust Memorial in Corfu

== Gallery ==
Images of the Rhode Island Holocaust Memorial and some of the plaques listing the names of the concentration and death camps established and operated by the Nazis and their collaborators:

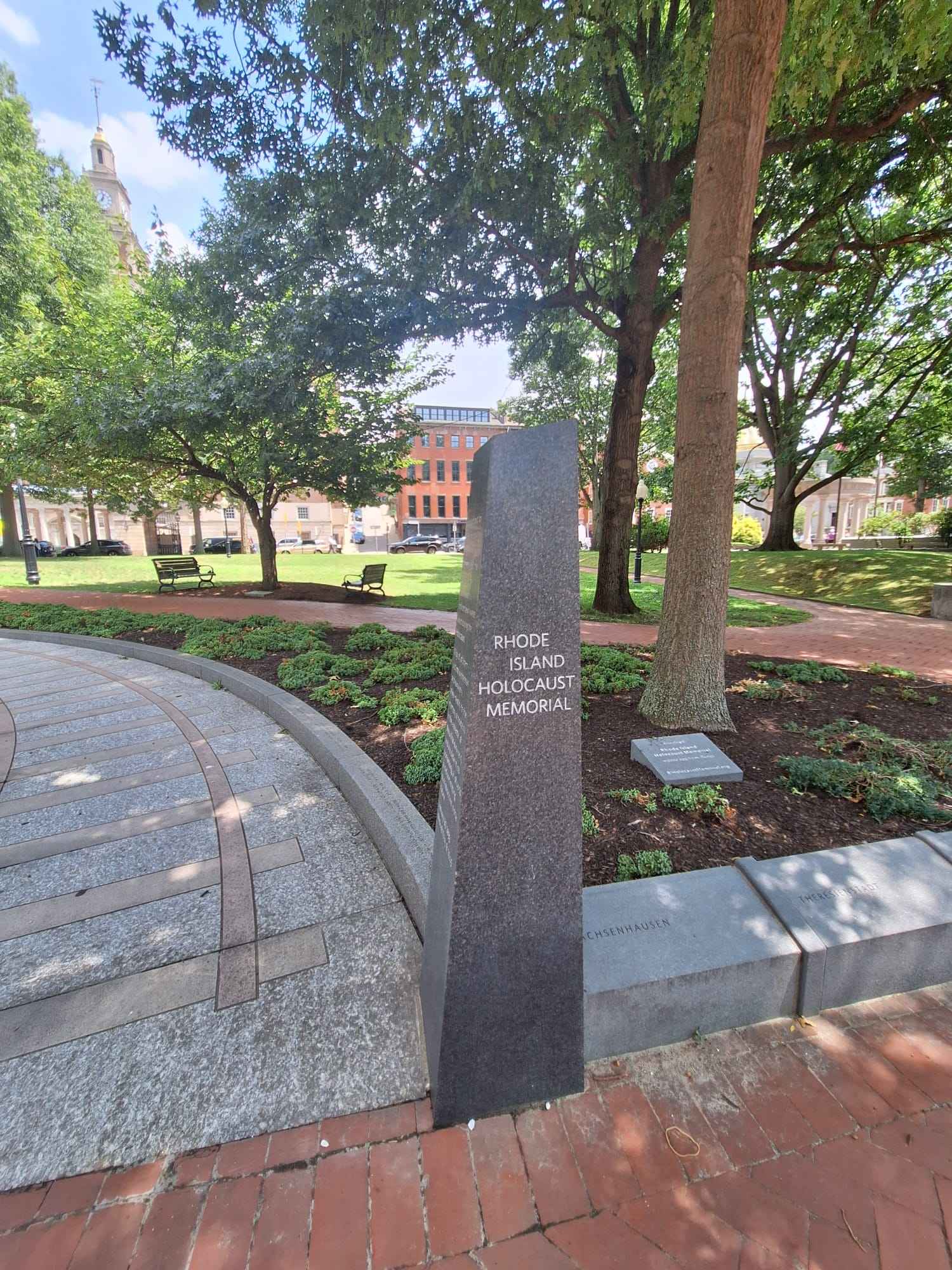
The Monument Title

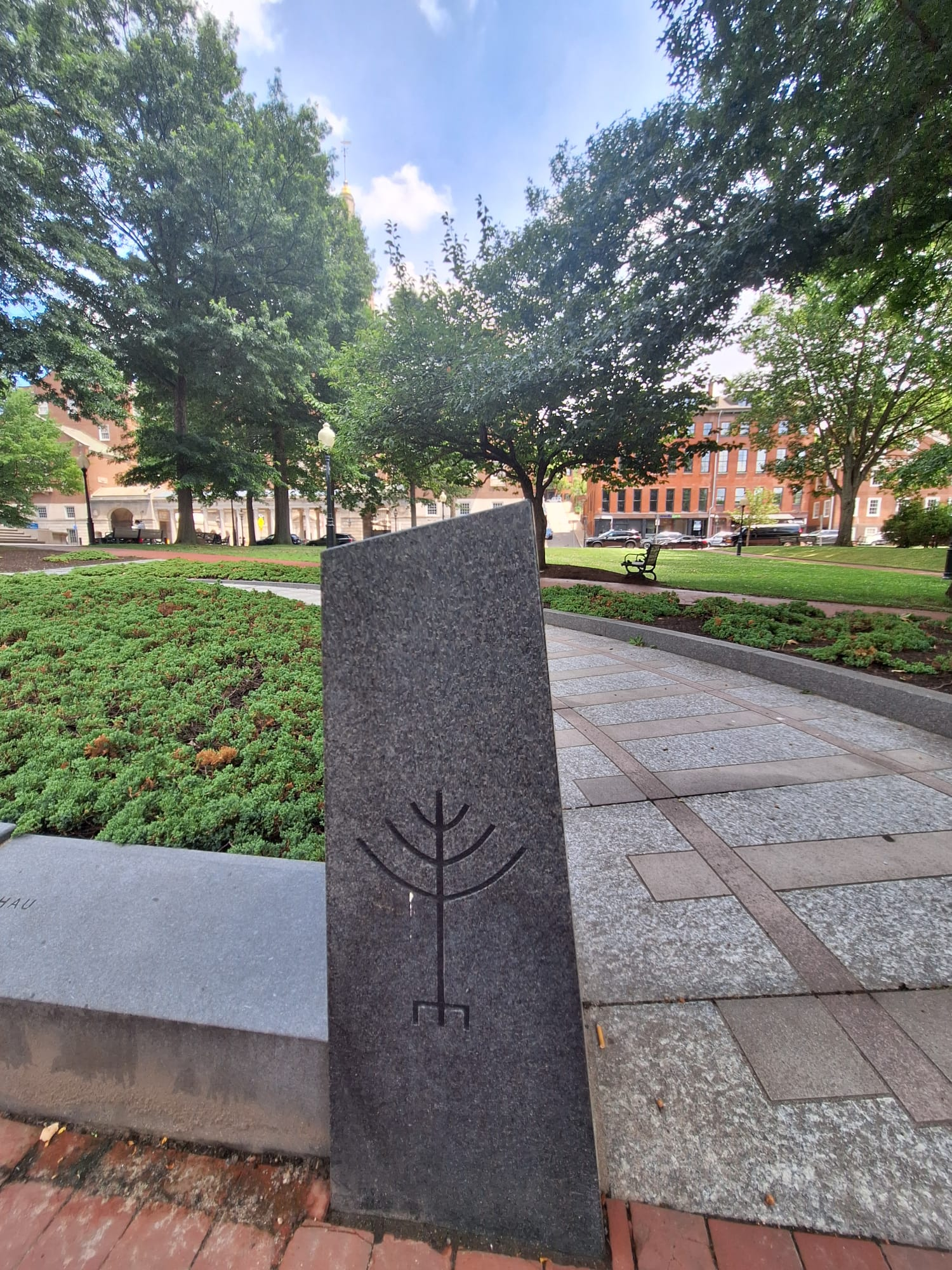
The Menorah at the Front

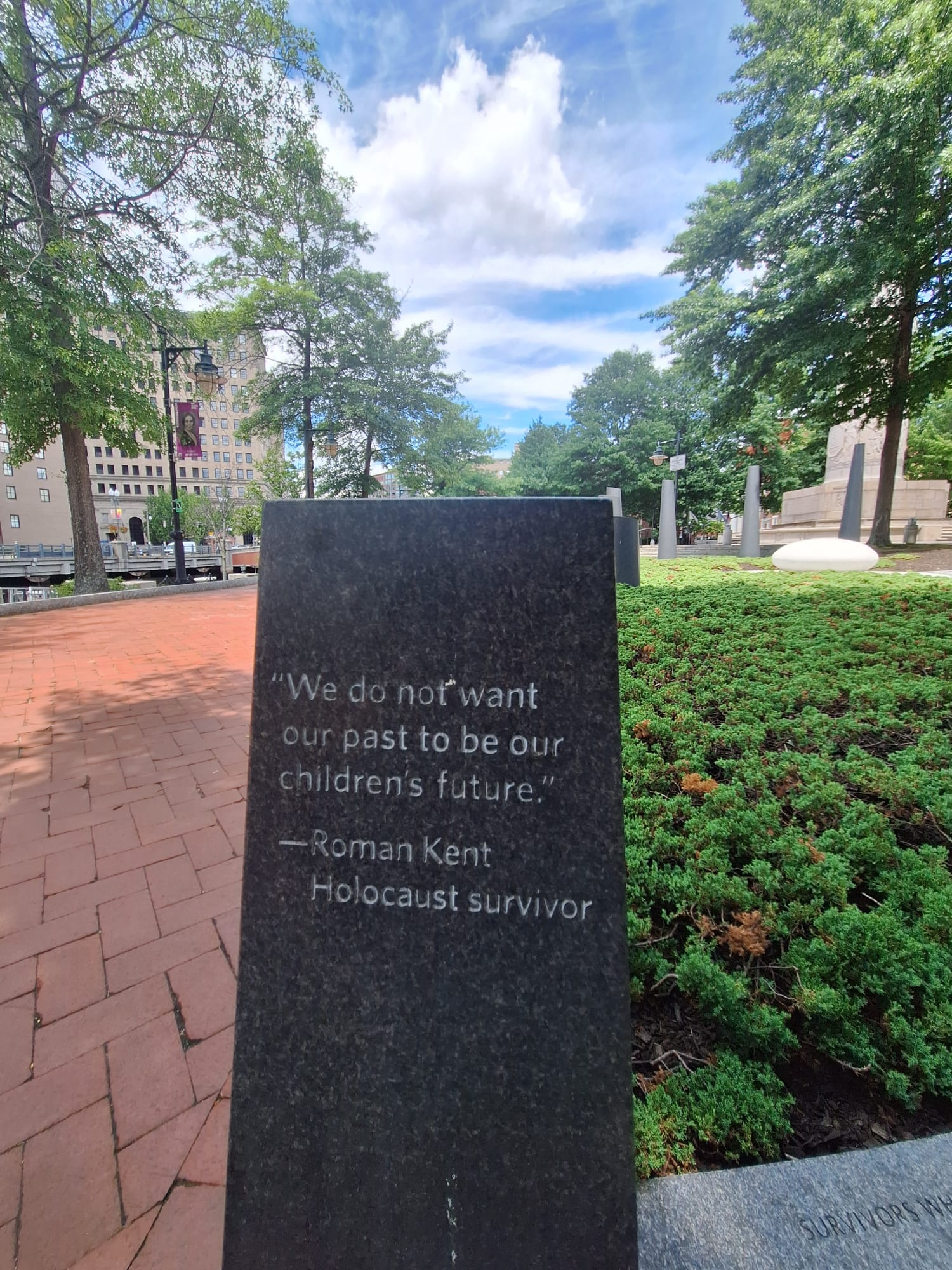
A quotation of a survivor

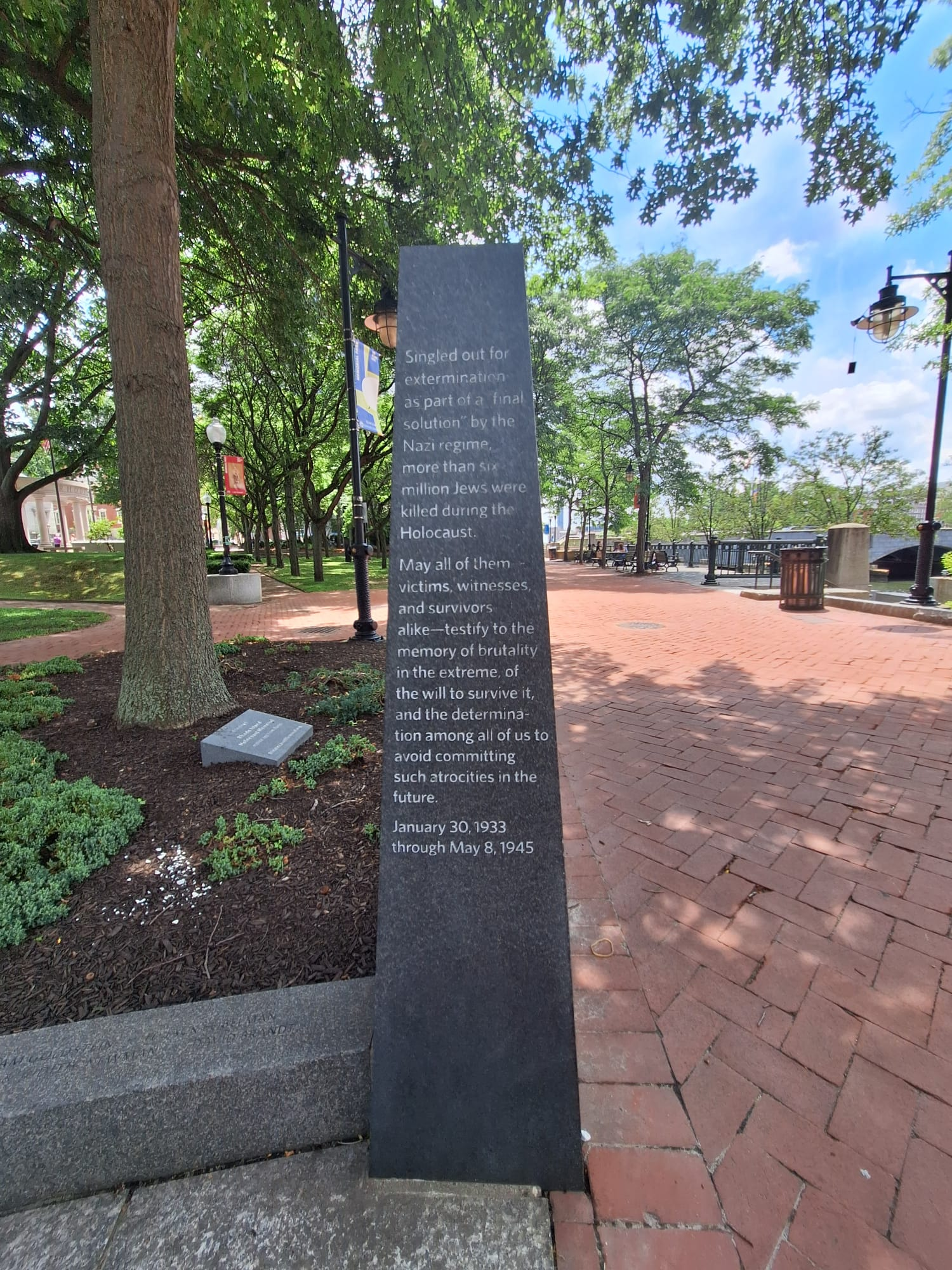
The Message of the Memorial - "Never Again"

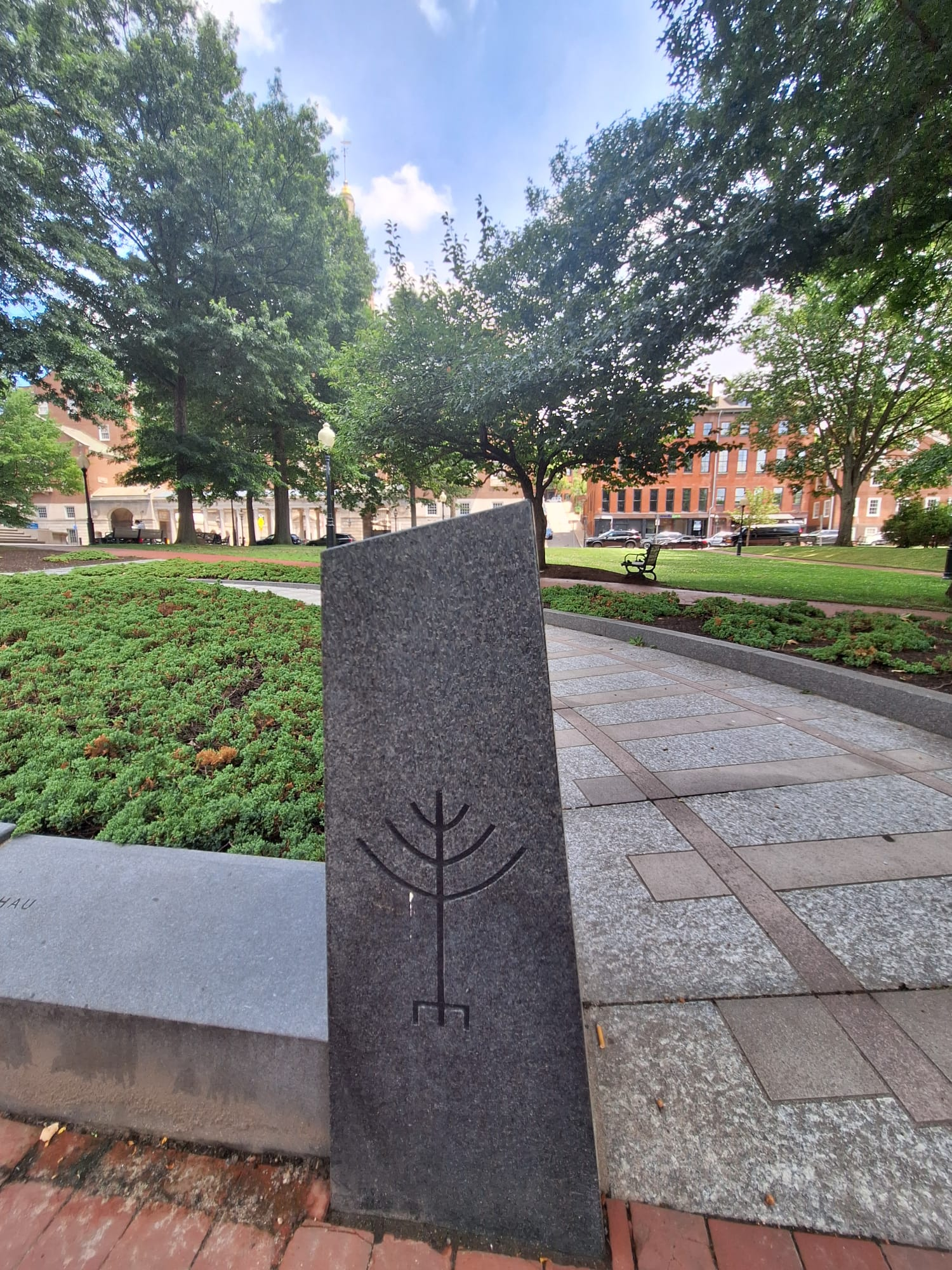
The Menorah at the front of the monument

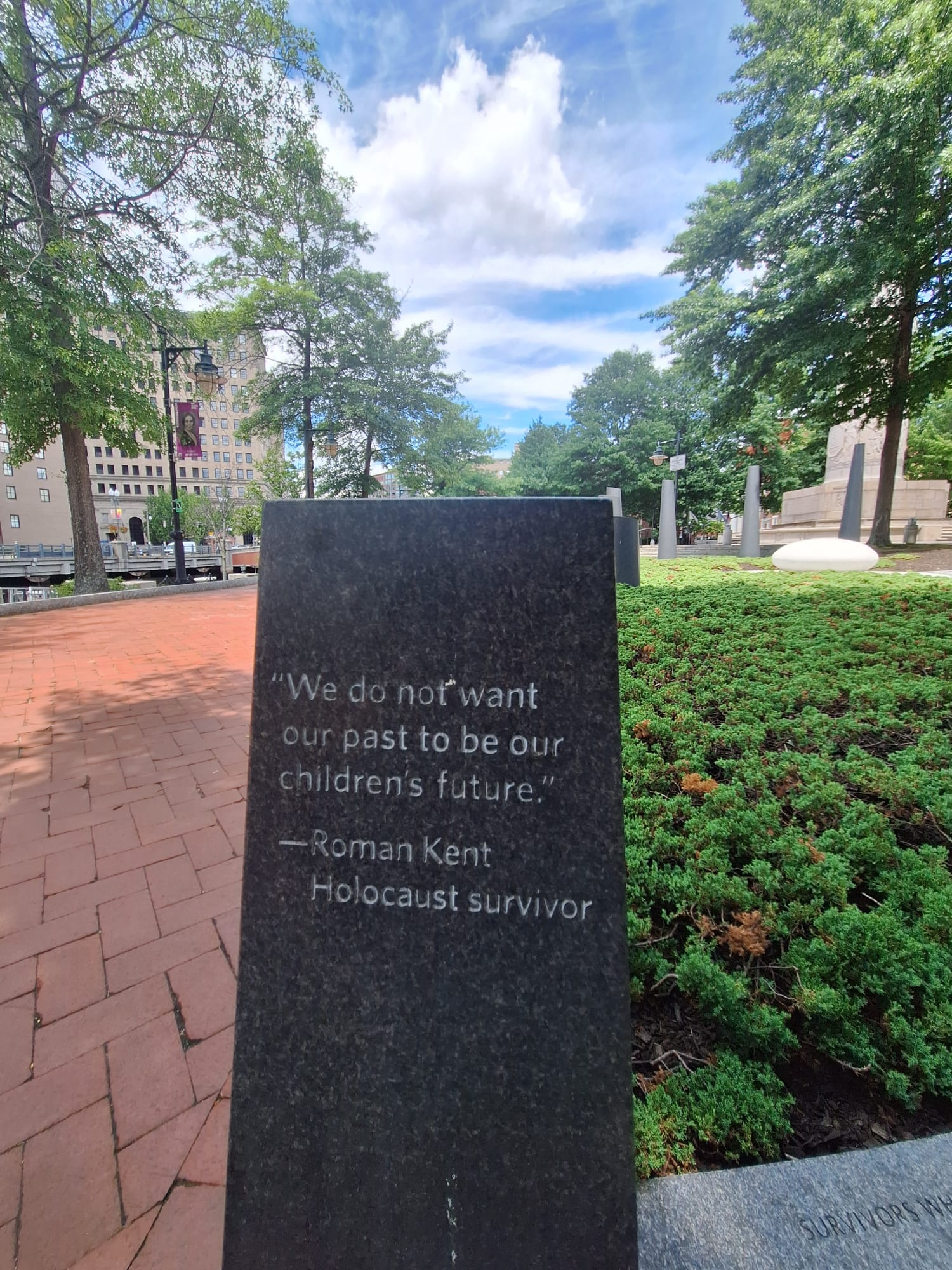
Quote from a Holocaust survivor

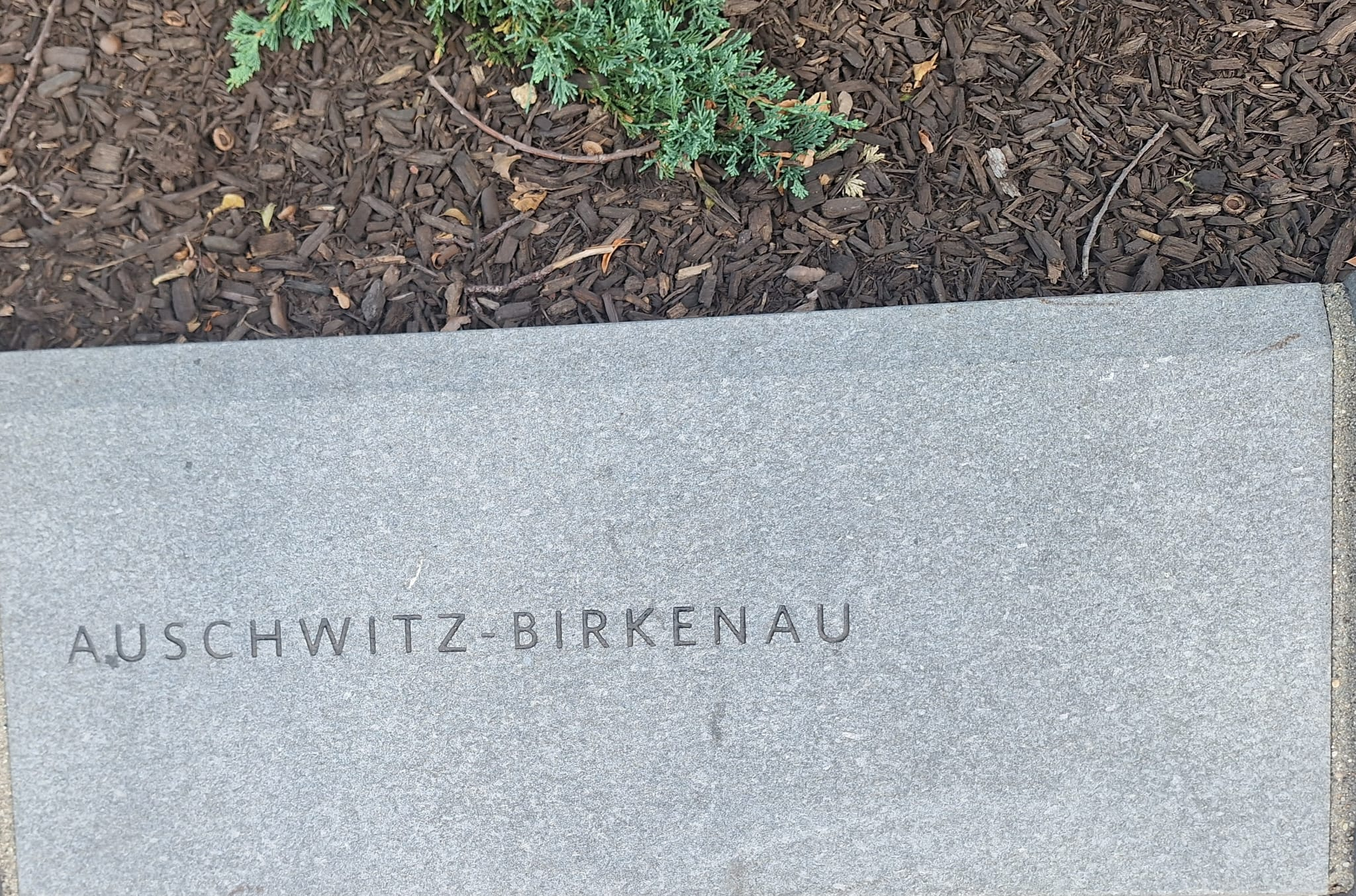
Auschwitz concentration camp

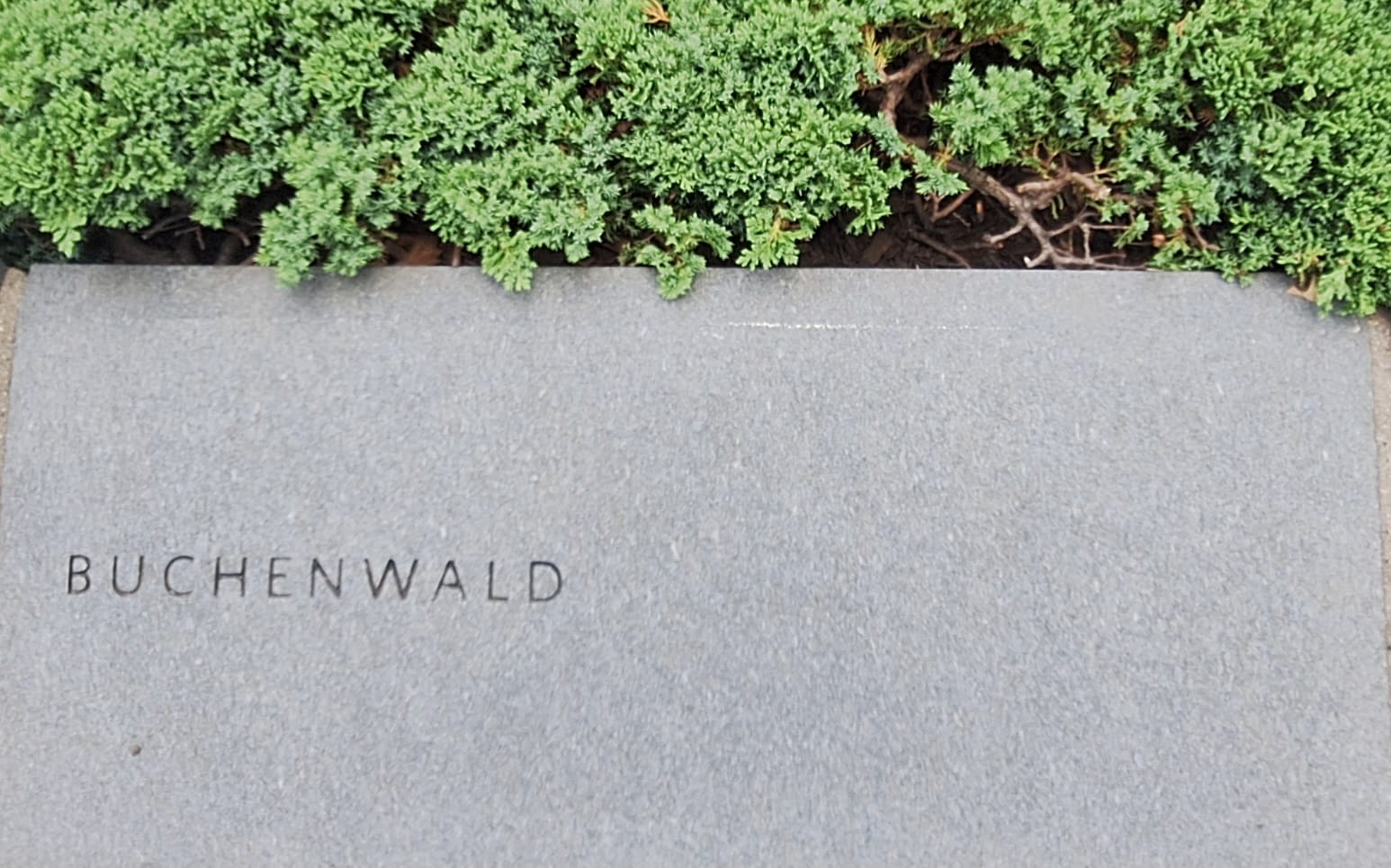
Buchenwald concentration camp

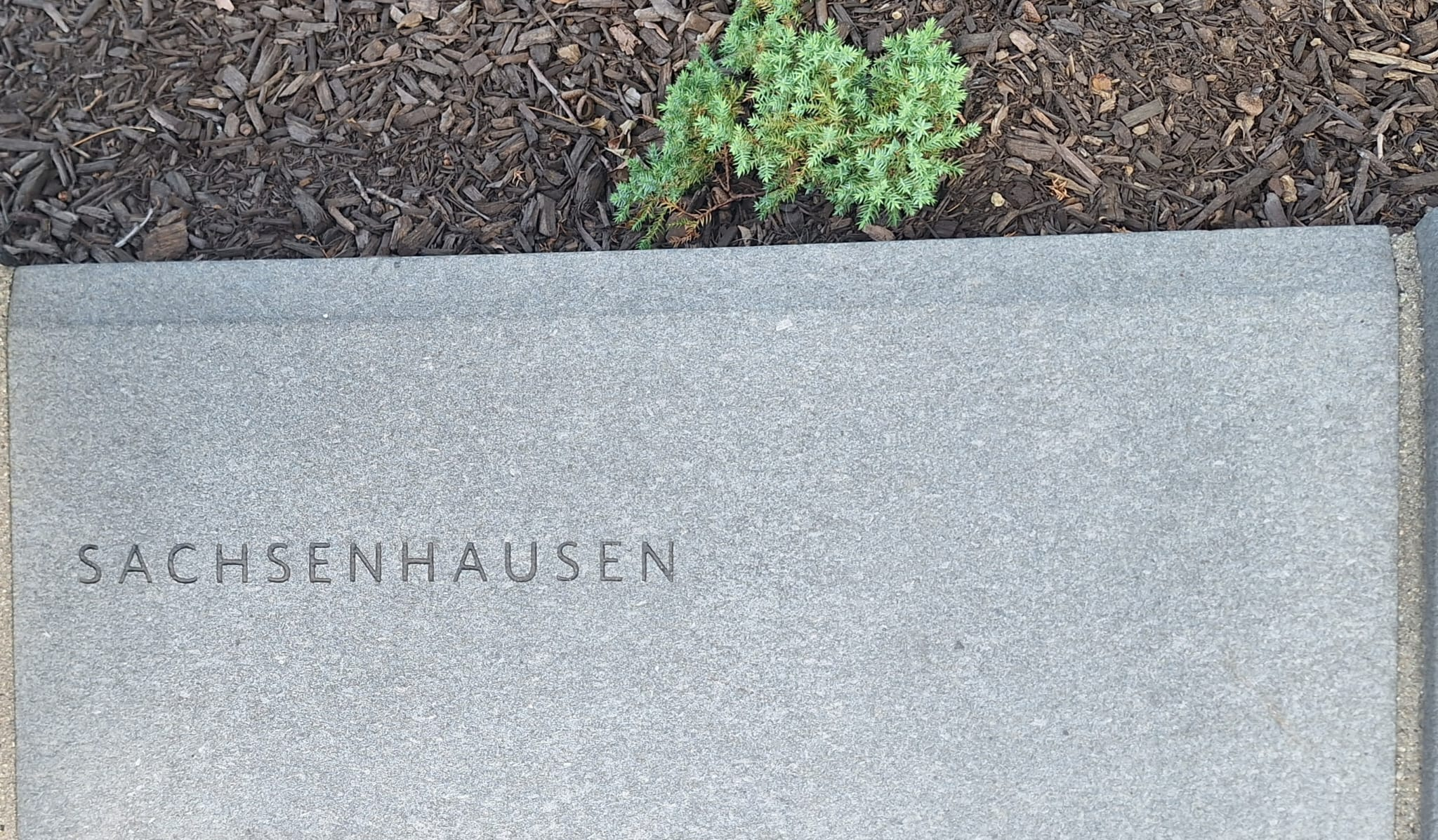
Sachsenhausen concentration camp

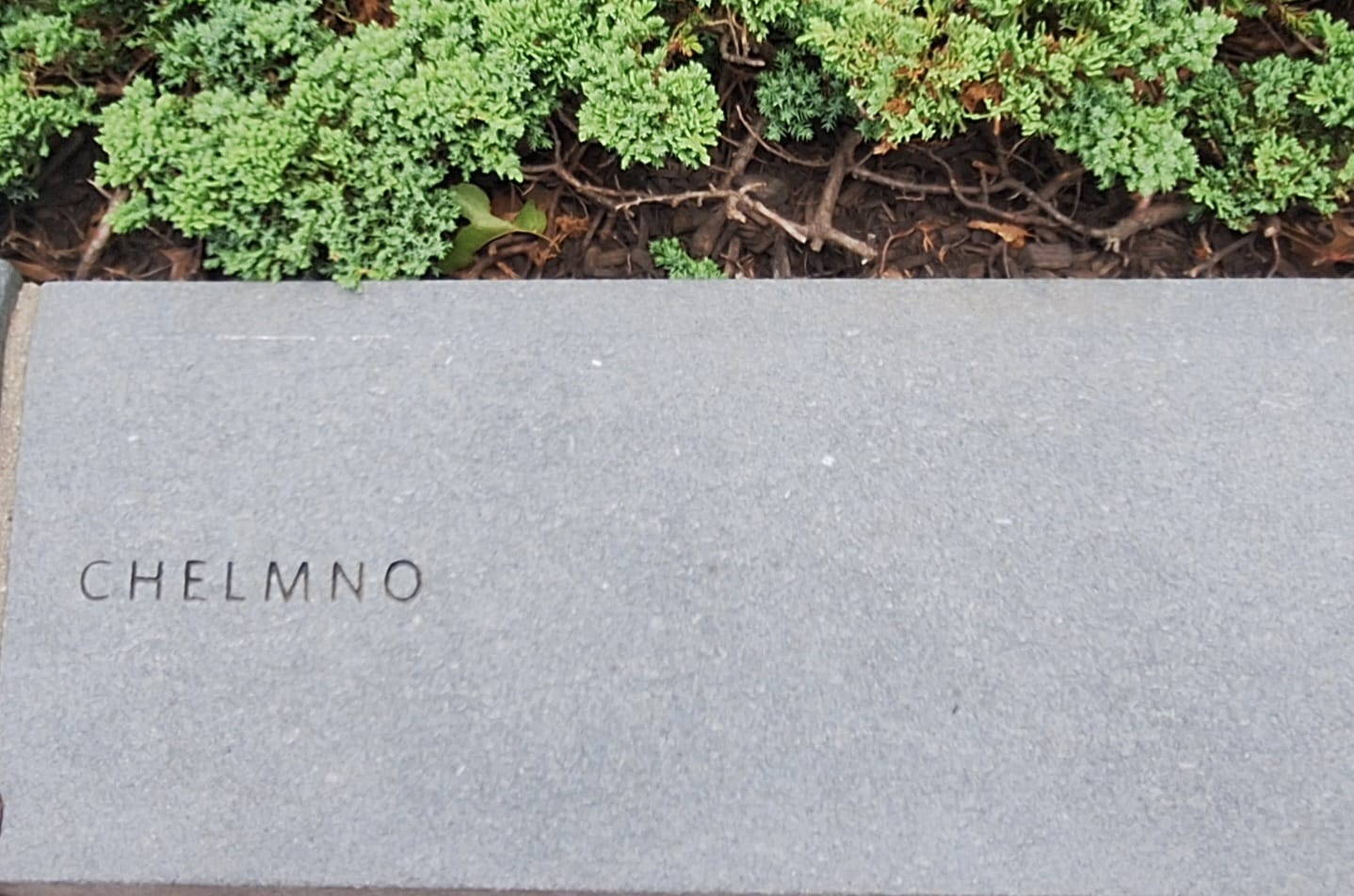
Chełmno extermination camp

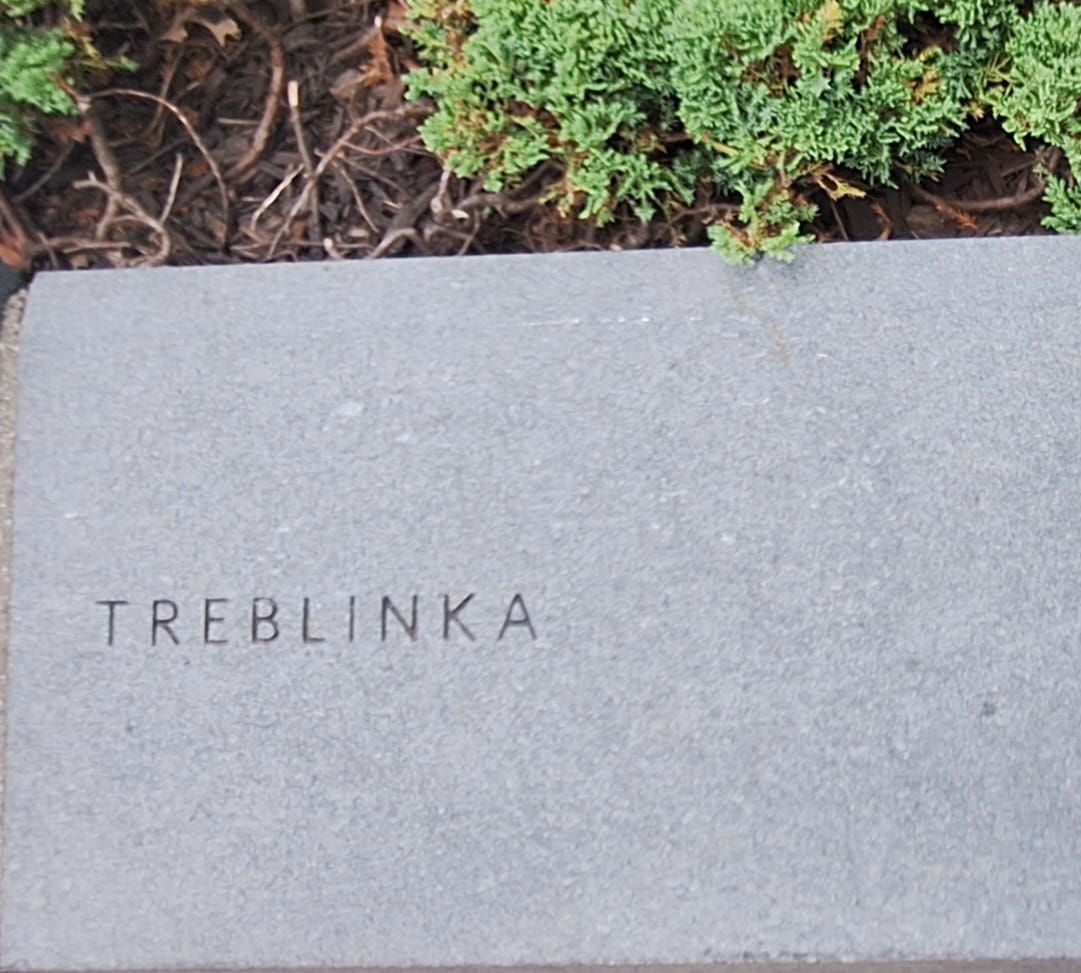
Treblinka extermination camp

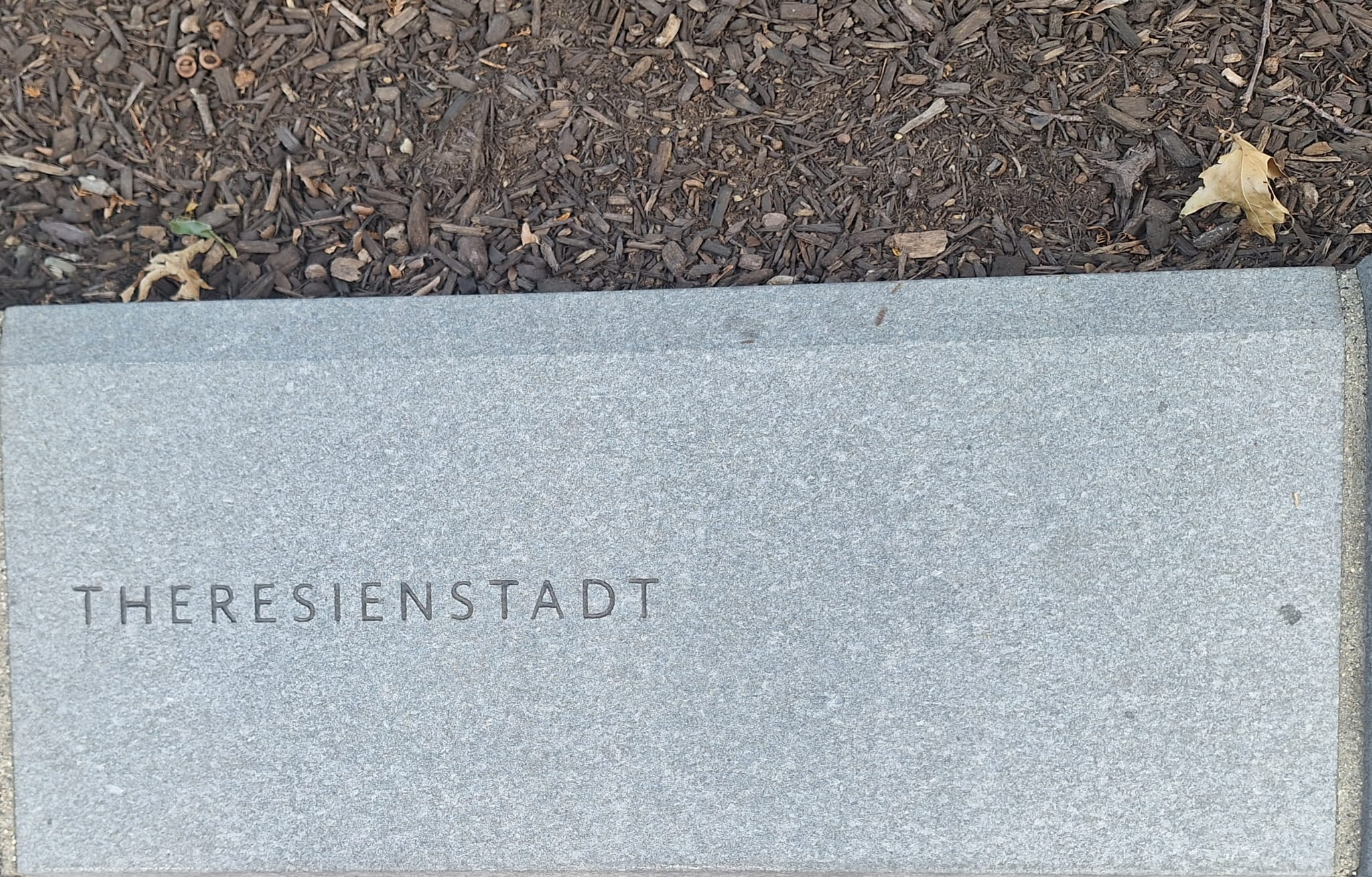
Theresienstadt Ghetto

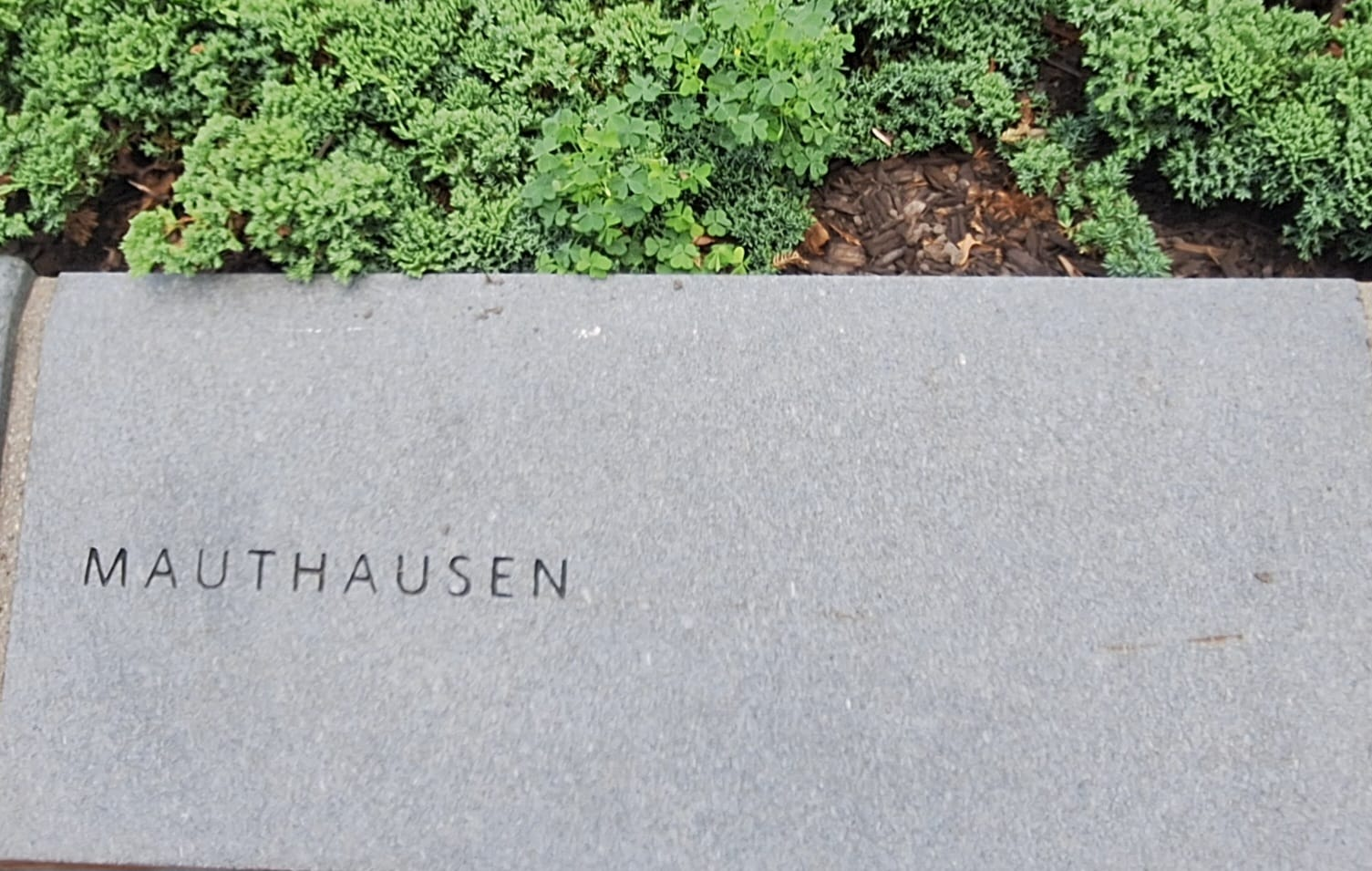
Mauthausen concentration camp

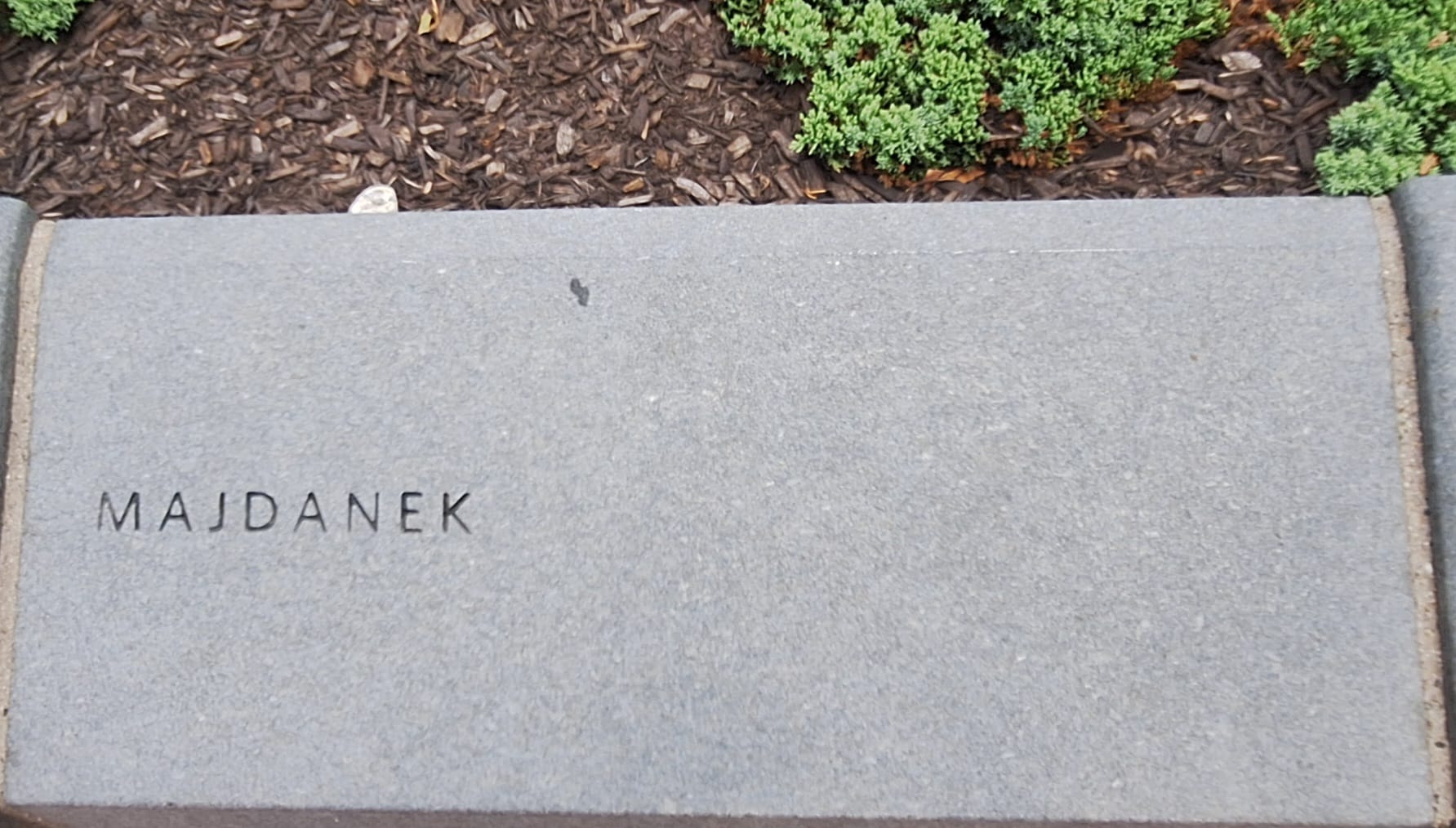
Majdanek concentration camp

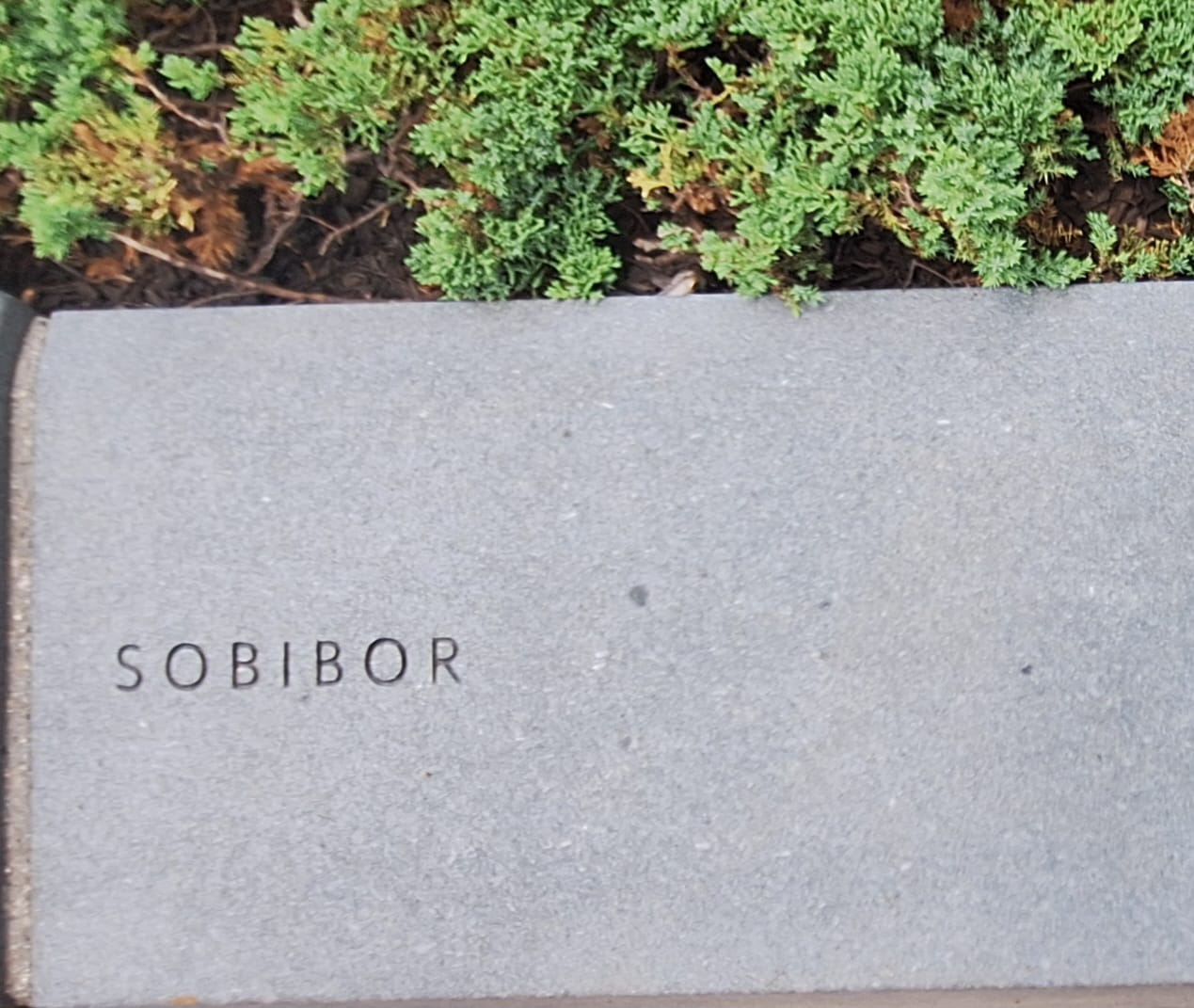
Sobibor extermination camp

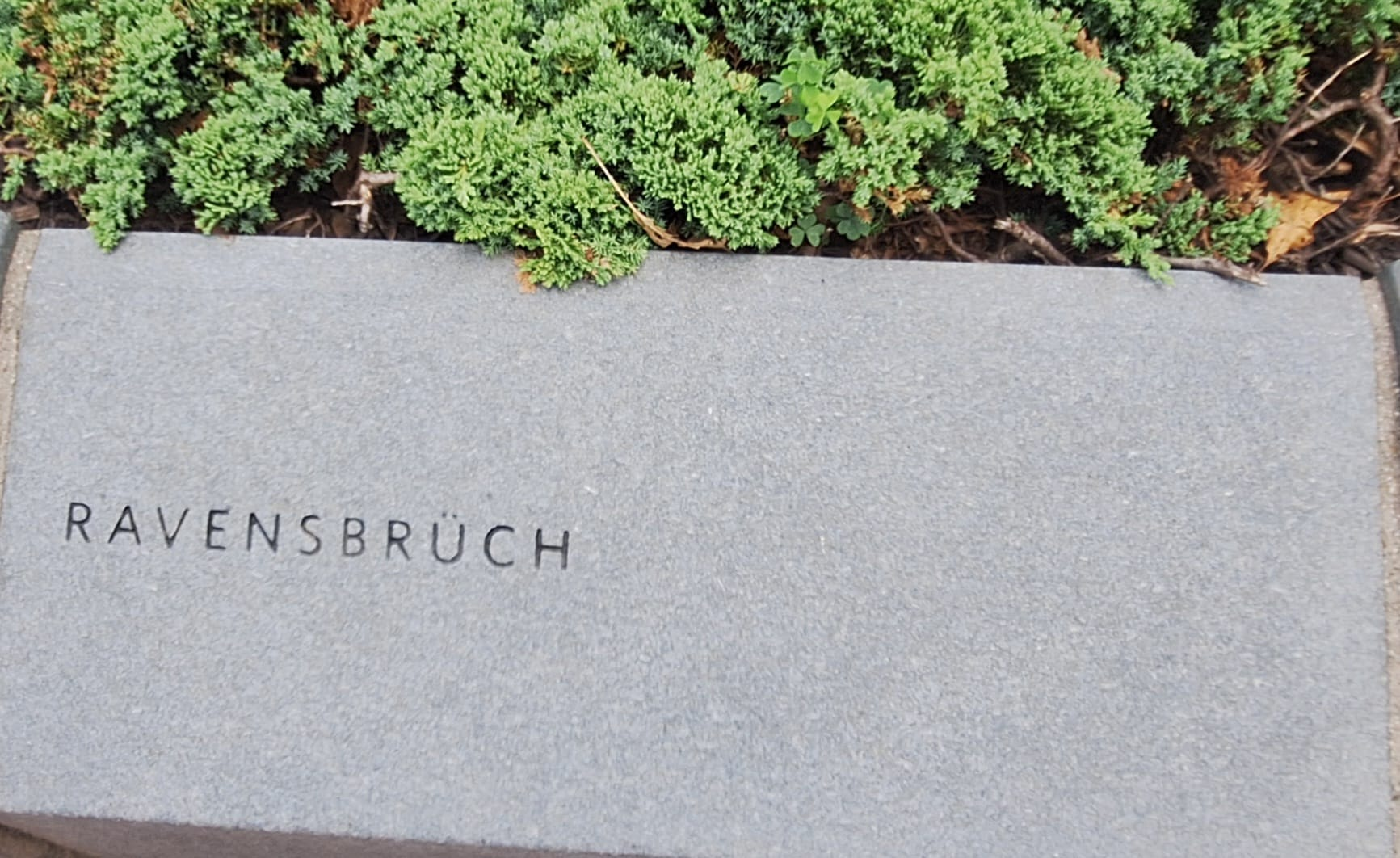
Ravensbrück concentration camp

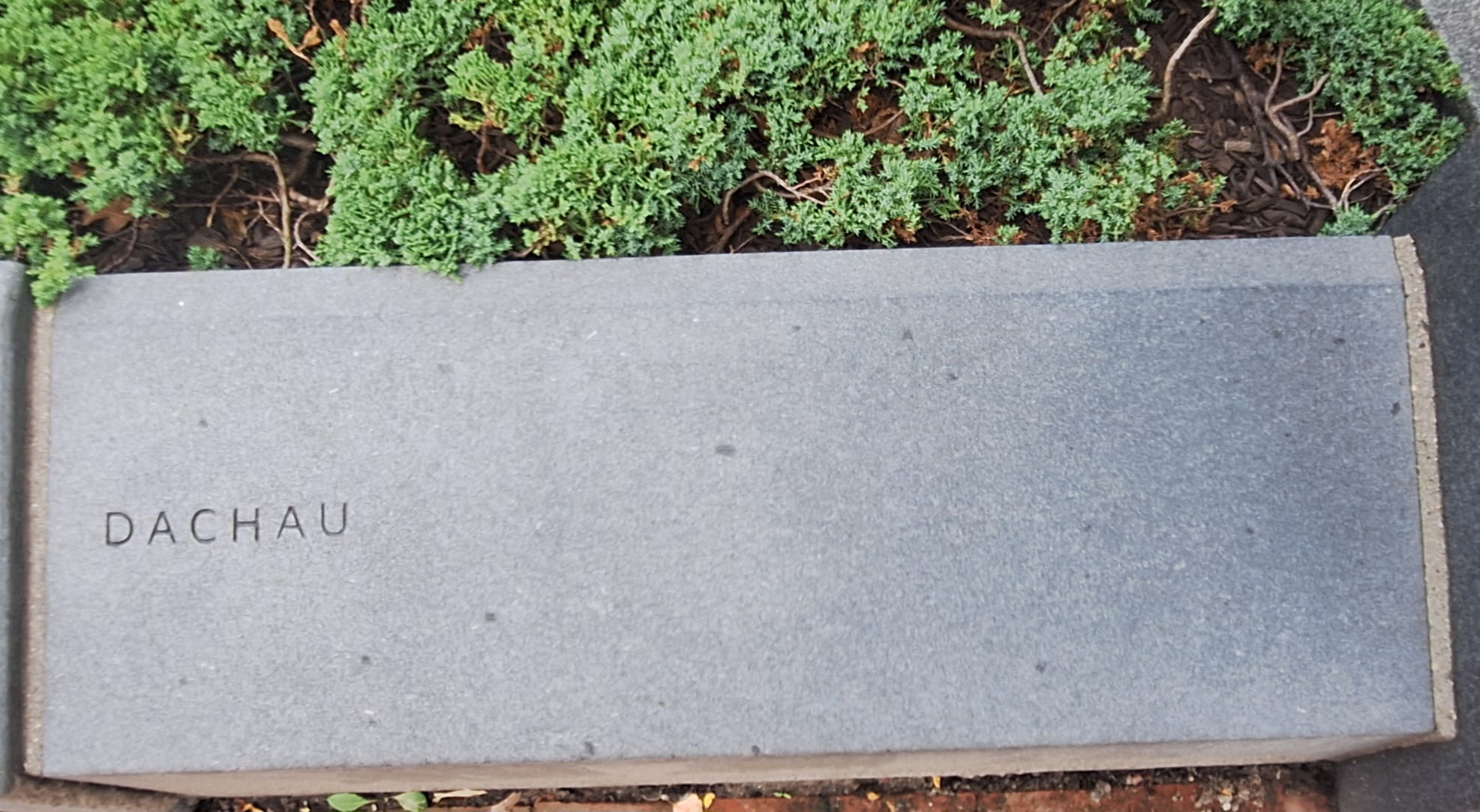
Dachau concentration camp

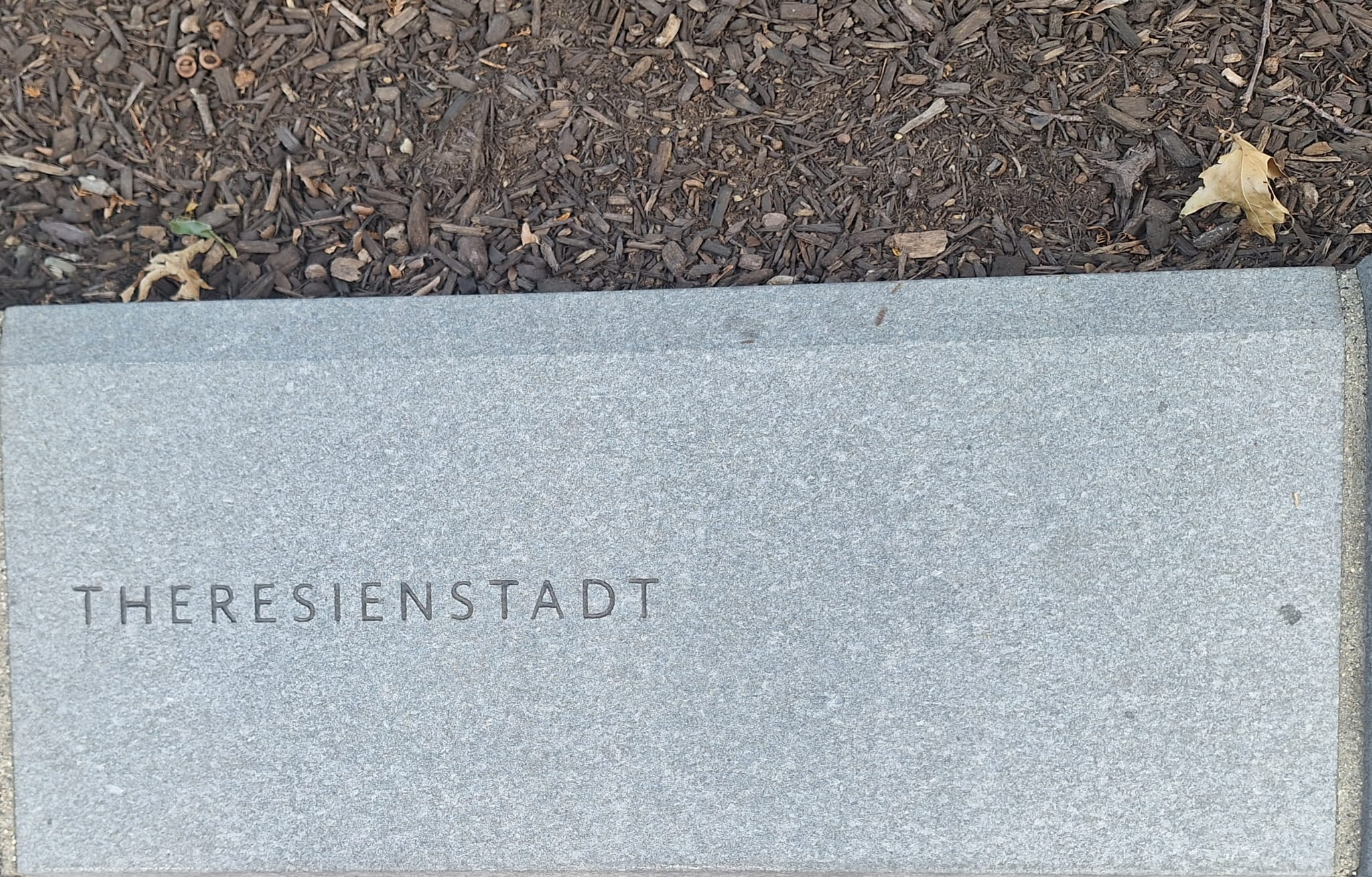
Theresienstadt Ghetto
