= Sacrificial victim =

A sacrificial victim (Latin: victima) is a living being that is killed and offered as a sacrifice. It may refer to:

- Animal sacrifice, the ritual killing and offering of an animal, usually as part of a religious ritual or to appease or maintain favour with a deity.
  - Sacrificial lamb, a metaphorical reference to a person or animal sacrificed for the common good.
- Human sacrifice, the act of killing one or more humans as part of a ritual, which is usually intended to please or appease deities, a human ruler, public or jurisdictional demands for justice by capital punishment, an authoritative/priestly figure, spirits of dead ancestors or as a retainer sacrifice, wherein a monarch's servants are killed in order for them to continue to serve their master in the next life.
  - Child sacrifice, the ritualistic killing of children in order to please or appease a deity, supernatural beings, or sacred social order, tribal, group or national loyalties in order to achieve a desired result.
  - Sacrificial victims of the Minotaur, fourteen young noble Athenian people (seven men and seven women) who were offered as sacrificial victims to the half-human, half-taurine monster Minotaur to be killed in retribution for the death of Minos' son Androgeos.

== See also ==
- Sacrifice (disambiguation)
- Victim (disambiguation)
