= The Holocaust Memorial in Corfu =

2001 bronze sculpture by Giorgos Karachalios

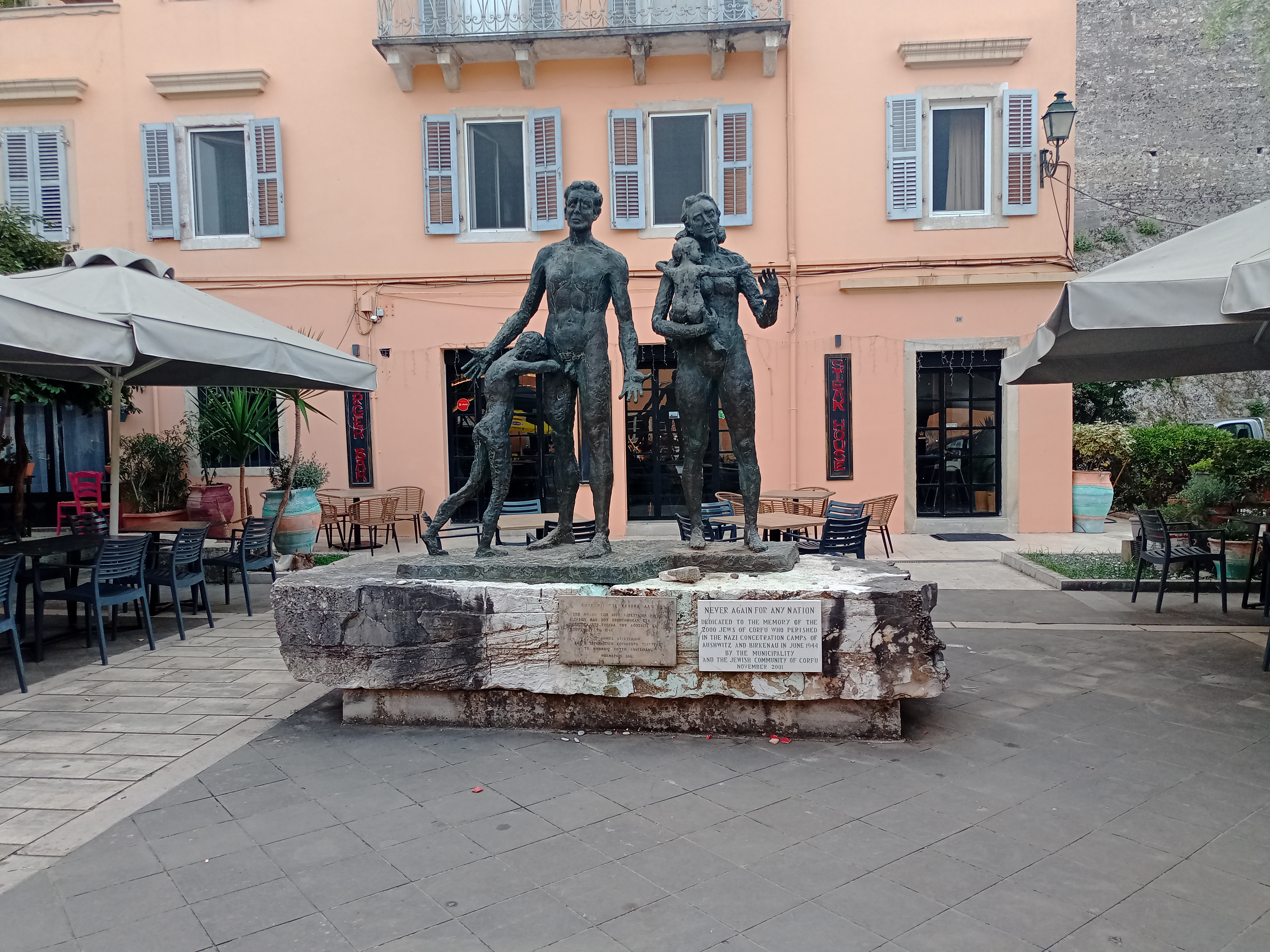
The Holocaust Memorial in Corfu

The Holocaust Memorial in Corfu (in Greek: Μνημείο Εβραϊκού Ολοκαυτώματος Κερκύρα) is a bronze sculpture of a family, set upon a large, rough-hewn stone base in Konstantinou Palaiologou Square—located in the former Jewish Quarter, in the northern part of Corfu Town's Old Town, near the port of Corfu.

This was the site of the island's Jewish community center before World War II. Today, the monument is surrounded by cafés and restaurants with outdoor seating that encroaches upon the monument's grounds. The sculptural group consists of four nude figures: a woman cradling an infant, a man with outstretched arms, and a young boy beside him. The boy rests his head and arm against the man's thigh, shielding his face from the viewer. Two stone plaques bearing inscriptions in Greek and English are set into the monument's base.

The monument was erected in 2001 at the initiative of the municipality and the Jewish community of Corfu. Since then, only a handful of Jews have returned to the island, and the community currently numbers only about 60 people. A short walk from the monument lies the synagogue—the only surviving Jewish house of prayer. The inscription on the monument's plaque (in English, as well as in Greek) reads as follows:

Never Again for any Nation

Dedicated to the memory of the 2000 Jews of Corfu who perished in the Nazi concentration camps of Auschwitz and Birkenau in June 1944

By the Municipality

and the Jewish Community of Corfu

— Jente de Roust, Jewish Holocaust Memorial in Corfu, Greece, November, 2001

== See also ==
- Rhode Island Holocaust Memorial
- Museum of Italian Judaism and the Shoah in Ferrara, Italy
- Shoah Museum (Rome)
