= Shoah Museum (Rome) =

Proposed Holocaust museum in Italy

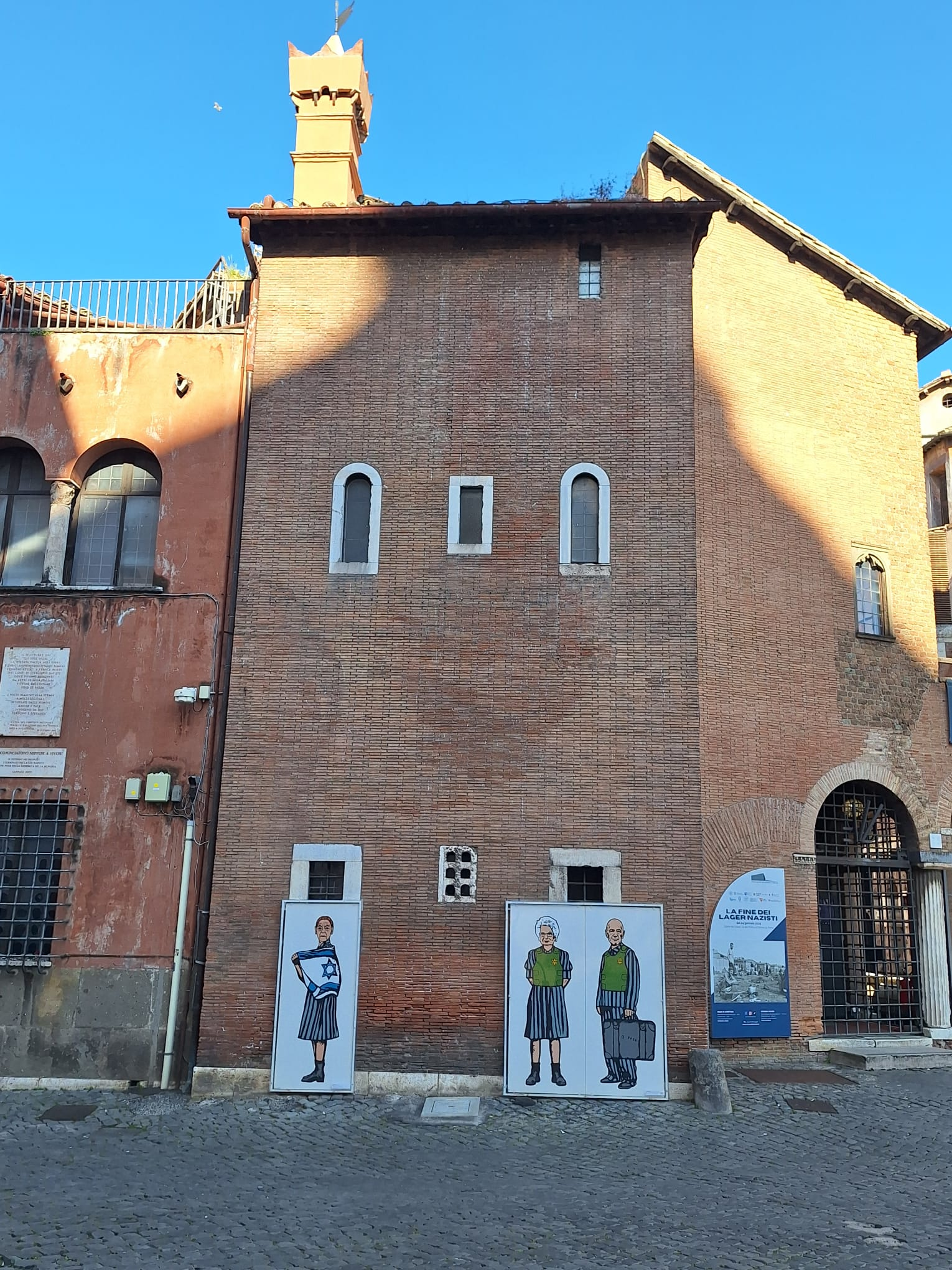
The Shoah Museum in Rome.

The Shoah Museum is a proposed museum in Rome, Italy. Upon completion, it would be the first Holocaust museum in Italy.

== History ==
The museum was first proposed as Italy's first museum about the Holocaust in 2005. In 2012, the Rome City Council approved the final plans for the museum. However, expected funding from the city was blocked due to austerity spending directives. The city of Rome planned to pay for the museum's $30 million construction cost.

As of 2013, Italian Holocaust scholar Marcello Pezzetti Marcello Pezzetti was slated to serve as the museum's inaugural director. Pezzetti headed the committee overseeing the museum's exhibition and research facilities. Pezzetti told the Jewish Telegraph Agency in 2013 that he wanted the museum to " “insert the Holocaust in the Italian context into the Holocaust in the European context."

After years of delays due to bureaucratic and financial issues. Italian Prime Minister Giorgia Meloni and her Culture Minister Gennaro Sangiuliano allocated 10 million euros ($10.5 million) to the museum project in March 2023. On 16 October, the 80th anniversary of a roundup of more than 1,200 Roman Jews by the Nazis in 1943, lawmakers in Italy's Chamber of Deputies began debate on the funding, which would support the museum's exhibits. On 18 October, the Chamber approved the funding.

The project is scheduled to be complete in 2026.

== Site ==
The Holocaust Museum is located next to the Jewish Museum of Rome and the city's Great Synagogue, on the left bank of the Tiber, where the Jewish ghetto was once located. The complex of these museums and the synagogue are very close to the Fabricius Bridge or the Four-Headed Bridge (Ponte Fabricio).

Luca Zevi is the museum's architect.

== The memorial plaques in the ghetto ==
There are two memorial plaques in the ghetto: one from October 25, 1964; and the other from January 2001.

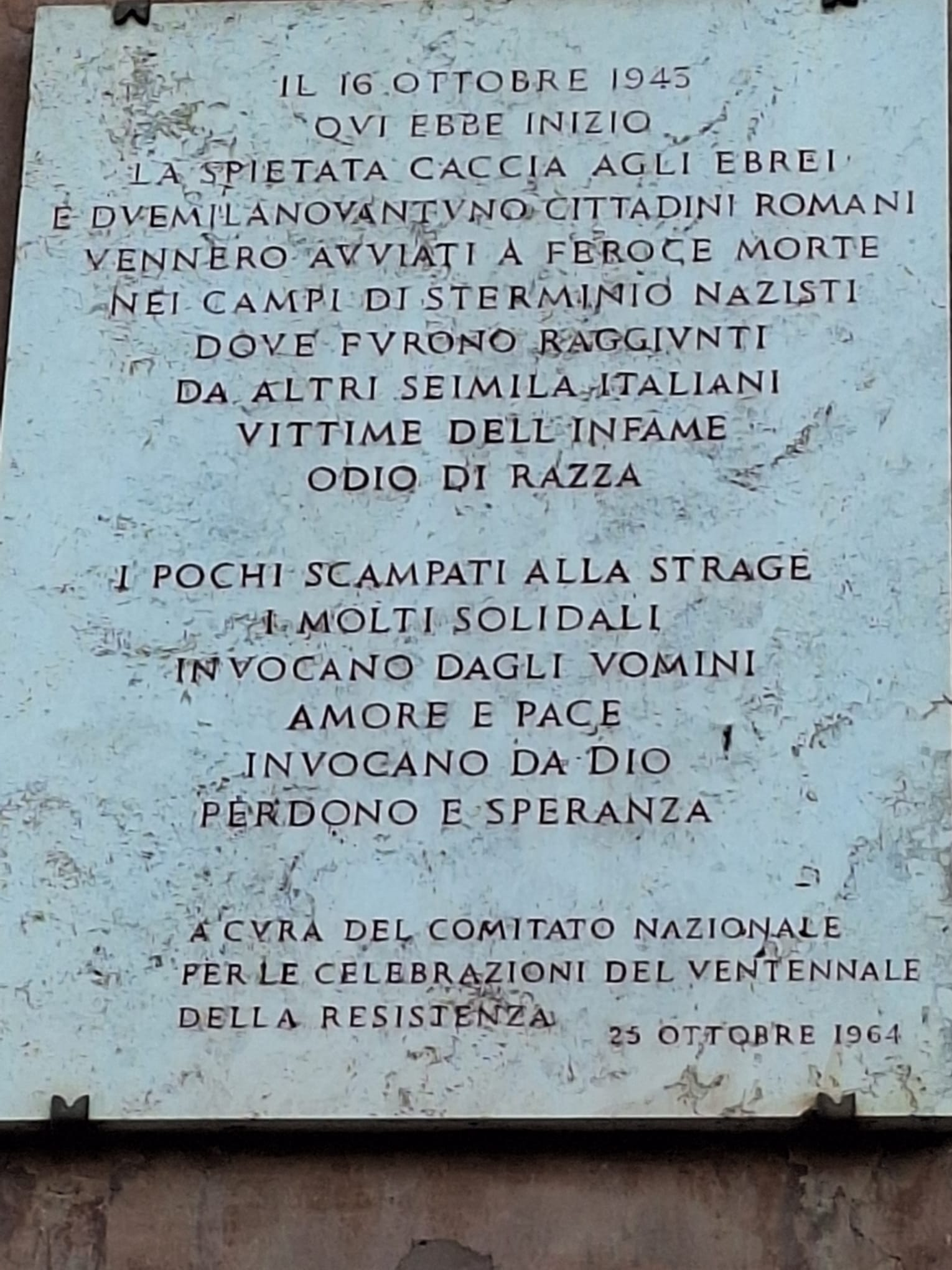
The 1964 memorial plaque in the Rome ghetto.

=== The October 1964 Memorial Plaque ===
The plaque was erected on the 20th anniversary of the Italian The anti-Nazi underground. The following is the translation from Italian:

"On October 16, 1943, the brutal hunt for the Jews in Rome began.

They were sent to a cruel death in the Nazi extermination camps, where they were joined by six thousand other Italians, victims of the notorious racial hatred.

The few who escaped the massacre, many in solidarity (with their neighbors?), call for love, peace, forgiveness and hope from God.

National Committee for the Celebration of the 20th Anniversary of the Underground

October 25, 1964"

=== Memorial plaque from January 2001 ===
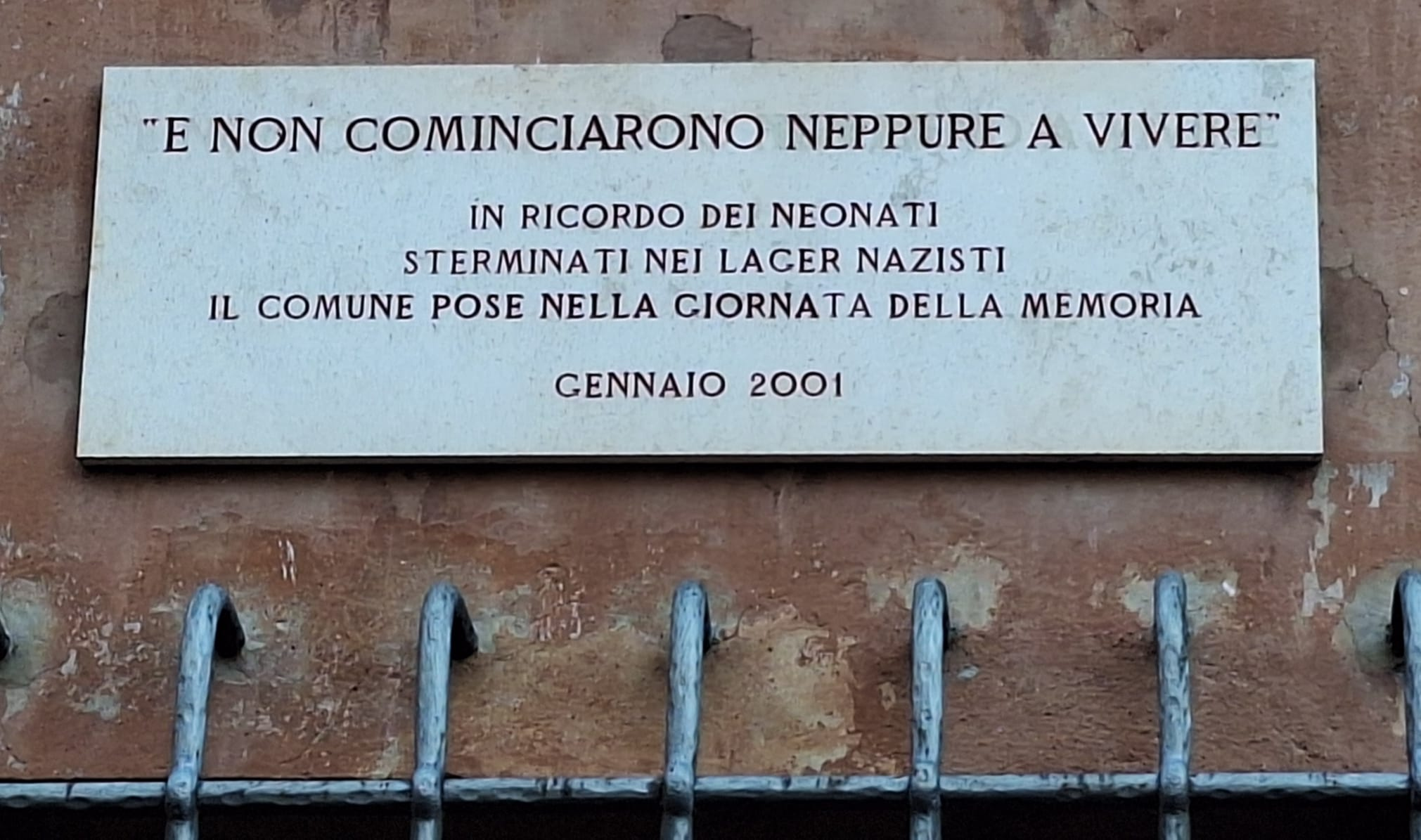
The 1964 memorial plaque in the Rome ghetto.

The plaque was placed after the decision of the Municipality of Rome to place a memorial plaque for fetus who were not born to their mothers who were murdered in the Holocaust. The following is the translation from Italian:

"'And they had not even begun to live'

In memory of the newborns who were exterminated in the Nazi camps, the Municipality established the Memorial Day

January 2001"

== Gallery ==
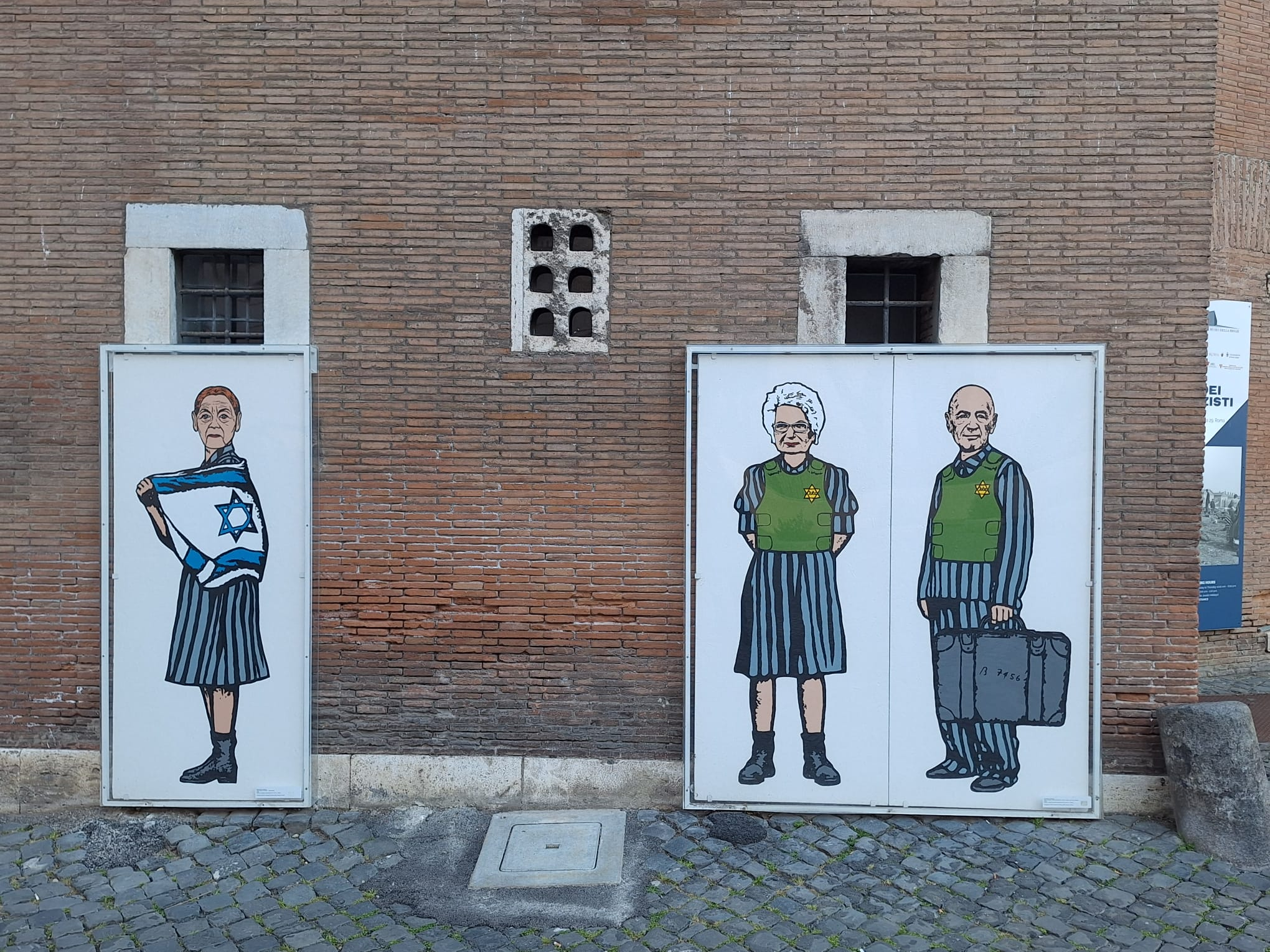
.

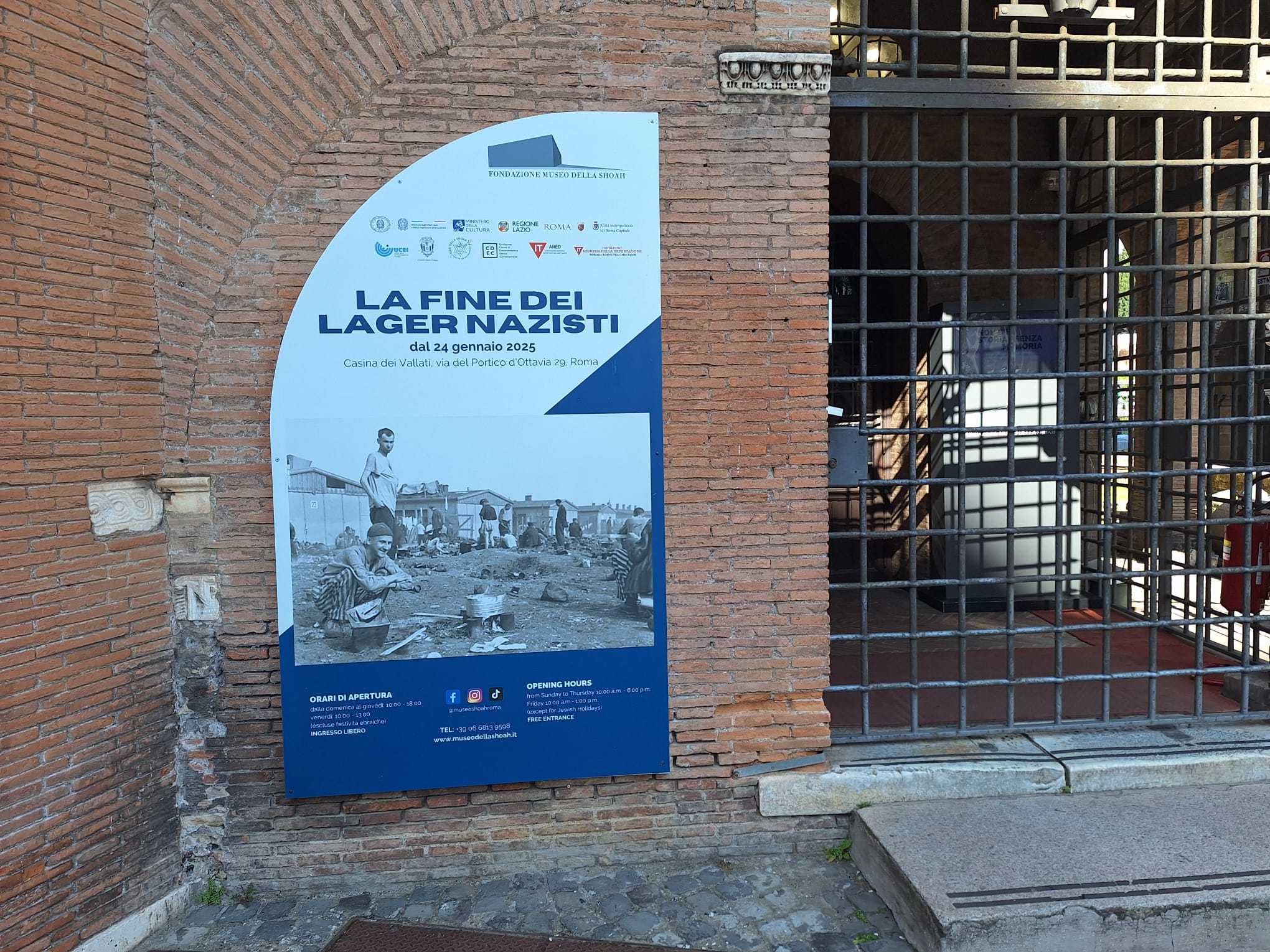
.

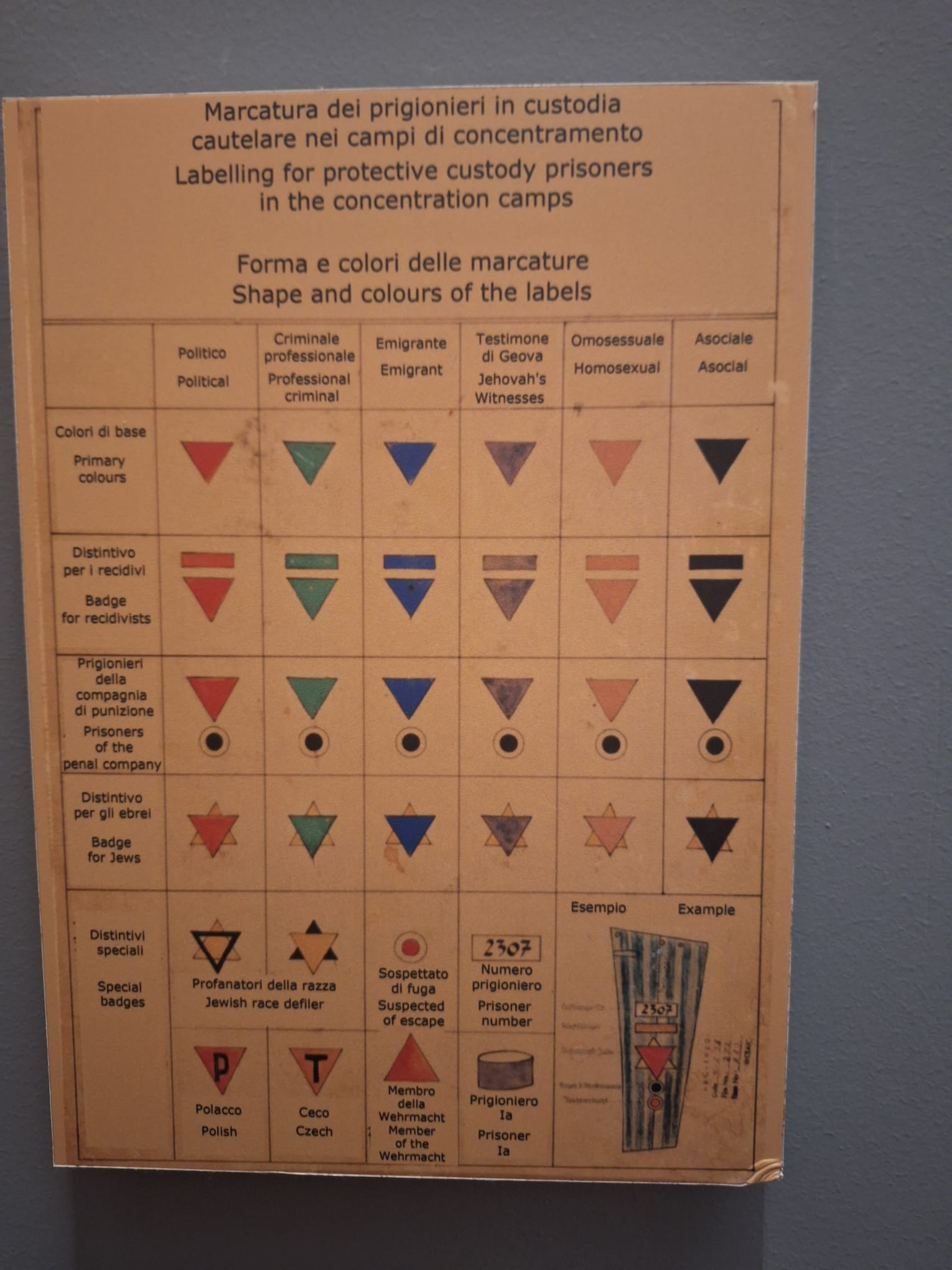
.

== See also ==
- Museum of Italian Judaism and the Shoah in Ferrara, Italy
- Rhode Island Holocaust Memorial
- The Holocaust Memorial in Corfu
