= Victim =

Victim(s) or The Victim may refer to:

== People ==
- Crime victim
- Victim, in psychotherapy, a posited role in the Karpman drama triangle model of transactional analysis
- Casualty (person), the victim of an event

== Films and television ==
=== Films ===
- The Victim (1916 film), an American silent film by the Fox Film Corporation starring vamp Valeska Suratt
- The Victim (1930 film), an American film starring Esther Howard
- Victim (1961 film), a British drama film featuring Dirk Bogarde
- The Victim (1972 film), a television film produced for American Broadcasting Company
- The Victim (1980 film), a Hong Kong film directed by and starring Sammo Hung
- Victims (film), a 1982 American television film
- Victim (1999 film), a Hong Kong film directed by Ringo Lam
- The Victim (2006 film), a Thai horror-thriller film written by Monthon Arayangkoon
- Victim (2010 film), an American indie film directed by Matt Eskandari
- The Victim (2011 film), an American horror film written by and starring Michael Biehn
- Victim (2011 film), a British action drama film written by and starring Ashley Chin
- Victim (2022 film), a Slovak-Czech-German thriller-drama film

=== Television ===
- "Victim" (Suspects), a 2015 television episode
- The Victim (2019 TV series), a Scottish miniseries starring Kelly Macdonald and John Hannah
- Victim (TV series), a 2022 Indian Tamil-language anthology thriller series
- "Victim", a 2024 episode of Animator vs. Animation

== Literature ==
- The Victim (novel), a 1947 Saul Bellow novel
- Victim: The Other Side of Murder, a 1980 book by Gary Kinder
- The Victim, the American title for Gabriele D'Annunzio's 1892 novel The Intruder
- The Victim, a 1914 novel about Jefferson Davis by Thomas Dixon, Jr.

== Music ==
=== Bands ===
- Victims (band), a hardcore punk/d-beat band from Sweden
- The Victims (Australian band), a punk band from Perth, Western Australia
- Victim, a punk band originally on the Good Vibrations record label

=== Albums ===
- Victim (album), 1996 by Gojira
- Victims (Steel Pulse album), 1991
- Victims (Lucky Dube album), 1993

=== Tracks ===
- "Victims" (song), 1983 by Culture Club
- "Victim" (Eighteen Visions song), 2006
- "Victim" (Sevi song), 2012
- "Victim", by Candi Staton, from the album House of Love, 1978
- "Victim", by Vangela Crowe (cover of the Candi Staton song), 2024
- "Victim", by Avenged Sevenfold from the album Nightmare, 2010
- "Victim", by Devin Townsend from the album Physicist, 2000
- "Victim", by Drain Gang from the album Trash Island, 2019
- "Victim", by Esmée Denters from the album Outta Here, 2009
- "Victim", by Kate DeAraugo from the album A Place I've Never Been, 2005
- "Victim", by The War on Drugs from the album I Don't Live Here Anymore, 2021
- "Victims", by Lacuna Coil from the album Broken Crown Halo, 2014
- "The Victim", by Juliana Hatfield from the album Juliana's Pony: Total System Failure, 2000
- "The Victim", by Memphis May Fire from the album The Hollow, 2011

== Other uses ==
- Victim cache, a special cache used in modern microprocessors
- The Victim (racehorse), a competitor in the 1849 Grand National steeplechase
- Victim (Animator vs. Animation), a stick figure that appears in the series.

== See also ==
- Victimisation
- Victimology
