= Museum of Italian Judaism and the Shoah =

- Museo Nazionale dell’Ebraismo Italiano e della Shoah
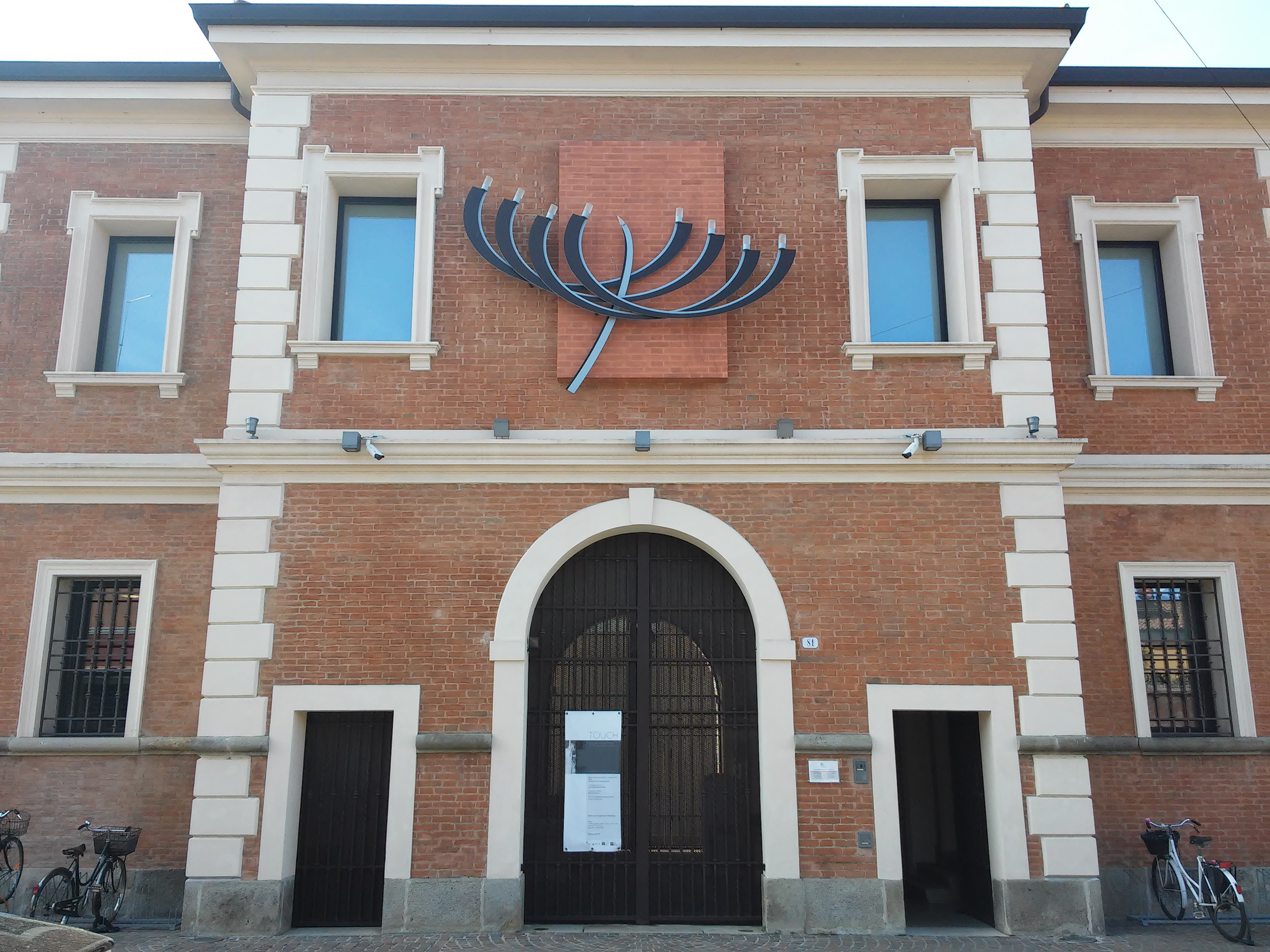
- Facade of the Museum of Italian Judaism and the Shoah
- Established: 2017
- Location: Ferrara, Italy
- Coordinates: 44.83552°N 11.613498°E
- Type: History museum
- Collections: Historical and religious artifacts
- Collection size: 200
- Director: Amedeo Spagnoletto
- President: Dario Disegni
- Curator: Sharon Reichel
- Architects: Studio Arco (Bologna), SCAPE S.p.A (Rome)
- Owner: Ministry of Cultural Heritage and Activities
- Parking: Ex MOF (no charge)
- Website: meis.museum/en

The Museum of Italian Judaism and the Shoah (MEIS) (Italian: Museo Nazionale dell’Ebraismo Italiano e della Shoah) is a public history museum in Ferrara, Italy. It opened in 2017, and traces the history of the Jewish people in Italy starting from the Roman Empire through the Holocaust of the 20th century. Chartered by the Italian government in 2003, MEIS contains over 200 artifacts and exhibits that proceed chronologically through the periods of Jewish history in Italy. The museum is continuing to expand through the year 2021.

== History ==
MEIS was established by an act of the Italian Parliament passed unanimously in 2003, which originally planned for the museum to focus only on the Holocaust. A second act of parliament in 2006 expanded the scope of the museum to cover all of Italian Jewish history. These acts funded the museum through the Ministry of Culture, which granted a total of 47 million euros (US$55.1 million) for the museum's construction, along with one million euros for annual upkeep. The museum also draws revenue from ticket sales and public fundraising efforts.

Ferrara was chosen as the museum's location because Jews have continuously lived since as early as the year 1227. During the Renaissance era, the city sustained a vibrant period of Jewish life under the rule of the House of Este, whose rulers encouraged Jewish settlement, and declined to confine Jews to a ghetto even as other Italian cities were doing so. Once the city was under papal rule, a Jewish ghetto was established in 1627.

The museum was inaugurated on December 13, 2017, in a ceremony attended by Italian president Sergio Mattarella. It opened with one permanent exhibition in two buildings. Construction continues, and four additional buildings will open by 2021. As of July 2018, MEIS had been visited by 15,000 people.

On October 28, 2019, the museum signed an agreement with the Colosseum in Rome to work together on educational programs about the role of Jews in the construction of the ancient amphitheater.

MEIS has caused an increase in other Jewish cultural activities in Ferrara, including a Jewish book festival, a Jewish choir festival, guided tours through the Ferrara ghetto, and the building of a path between the museum and the city's medieval synagogue.

== Collection and exhibitions ==
Though MEIS does not yet have a collection of its own, it displays about 200 loaned artifacts from Jewish history in Italy – including documents, manuscripts, instruments, jewelry, ceremonial objects, and household goods – show how Jews contributed to Italian society. Most of the museum's artifacts are on loan from other Italian museums or museums around the world. The collection includes reproductions of the Jewish catacombs in Rome; headstones from eleven different ancient Jewish congregations; a book by Jewish historian Flavius Josephus from 1490; a handwritten contract by the father of Leonardo da Vinci; a Pompeiian statue of Roman Emperor Titus; and a replica of the Arch of Titus, which was originally built to commemorate Rome's conquest of Jerusalem.

The museum traces the history of Jews in Italy chronologically and contains multimedia installations as well as artifacts. Visitors watch videos of experts explain different parts of the history, accompanied with maps and timelines. MEIS's inaugural permanent exhibition is "Jews, an Italian Story. The First Thousand Years". Opened in March 2019, the second permanent exhibition is called "The Renaissance Speaks Hebrew", which features a Torah scroll dating to the 13th century from Biella in Italy's Piedmont region. The third exhibition, about the Holocaust, was scheduled to open in September 2019. The museum has also displayed a temporary exhibition on local jewry, titled "Jewish Ferrara".

== Architecture and grounds ==
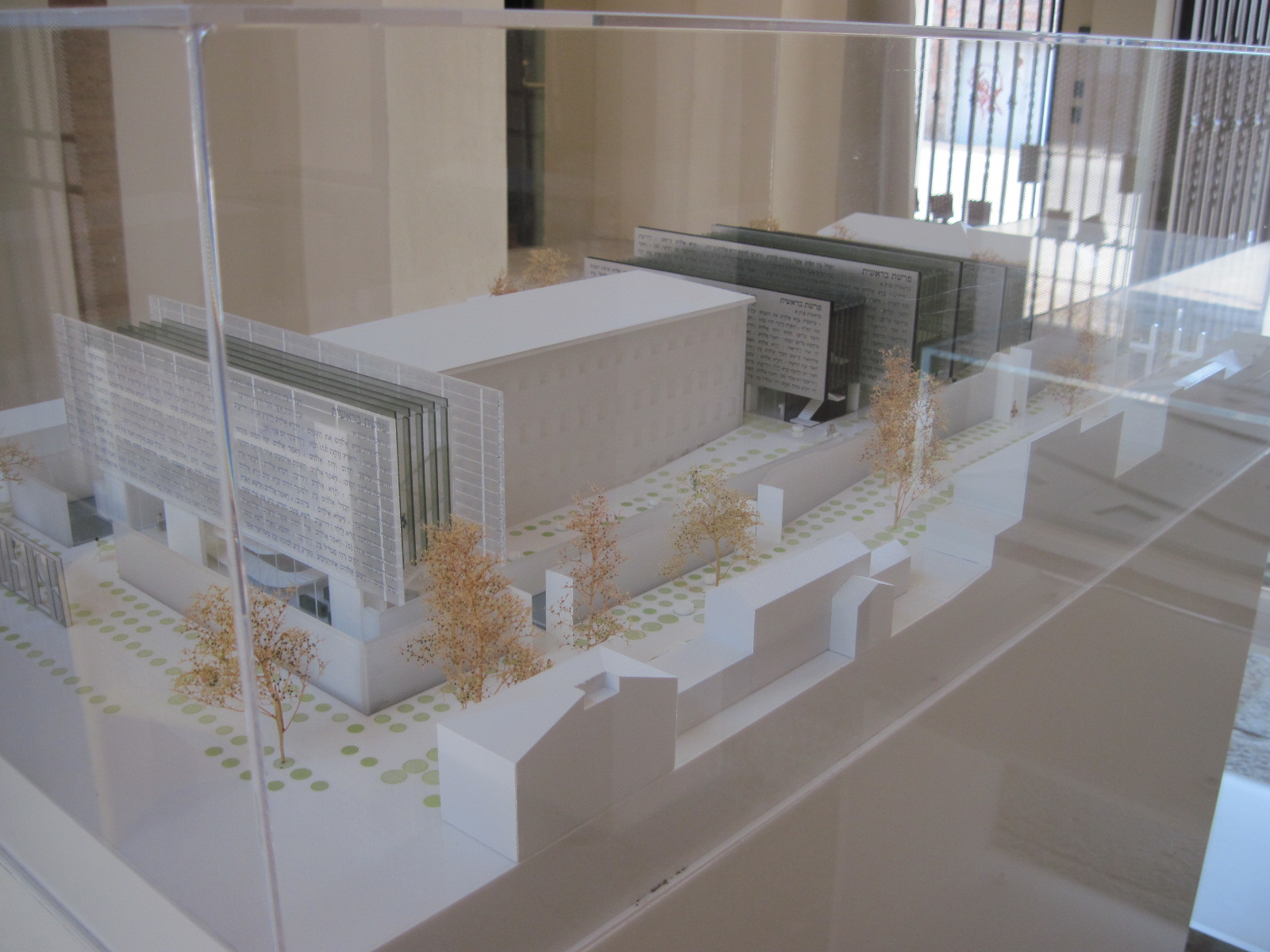
Architectural model of museum expansion

Upon its opening in 2017, the museum existed in two former prison buildings within walking distance of the old Jewish ghetto. First opened in 1912, the prison was used to detain Jews during World War II before they were sent to concentration camps. The prison closed in 1992 and was renovated to be the site for MEIS partially because of the potential to convert a prison that had incarcerated Jews into an institution about Jewish culture.

As of 2019, MEIS is constructing five additional adjoining glass buildings on its 2.48-acre (1.00 ha) site, architecturally designed to represent the five books of the Torah. The facades of the buildings will display biblical verses. Construction is planned to be completed before 2025. When complete, the museum will comprise 100,000 square feet (9,300 m^{2}) of space. The finished complex will include a library, auditorium, Ferrara's first two kosher restaurants, shop, archive, educational spaces, and a section for youth. The plan also includes an outdoor herb garden called the "Garden of Questions" (Italian: Giardino delle Domande), in which visitors can learn about Jewish dietary laws.

== See also ==
- Shoah Museum, proposed Holocaust museum in Rome
