= Victory Park (Moscow) =

Park in Moscow, Russia

- Interactive map of Victory Park
- Type: Memorial Park
- Location: Moscow, Russia
- Coordinates: 55.73167°N 37.50667°E
- Status: State-Protected

Victory Park (Russian: Парк Победы) is one of the largest memorial complexes in Russia, with an area of 135 hectares. The park is dedicated to the USSR's victory on the Eastern Front of World War II and includes the Museum of the Great Patriotic War. It is located in the Western Administrative Okrug of Moscow, on Poklonnaya Hill. It was opened on May 9, 1995, for the 50th anniversary of Victory Day.

== History ==
=== Poklonnaya Hill ===
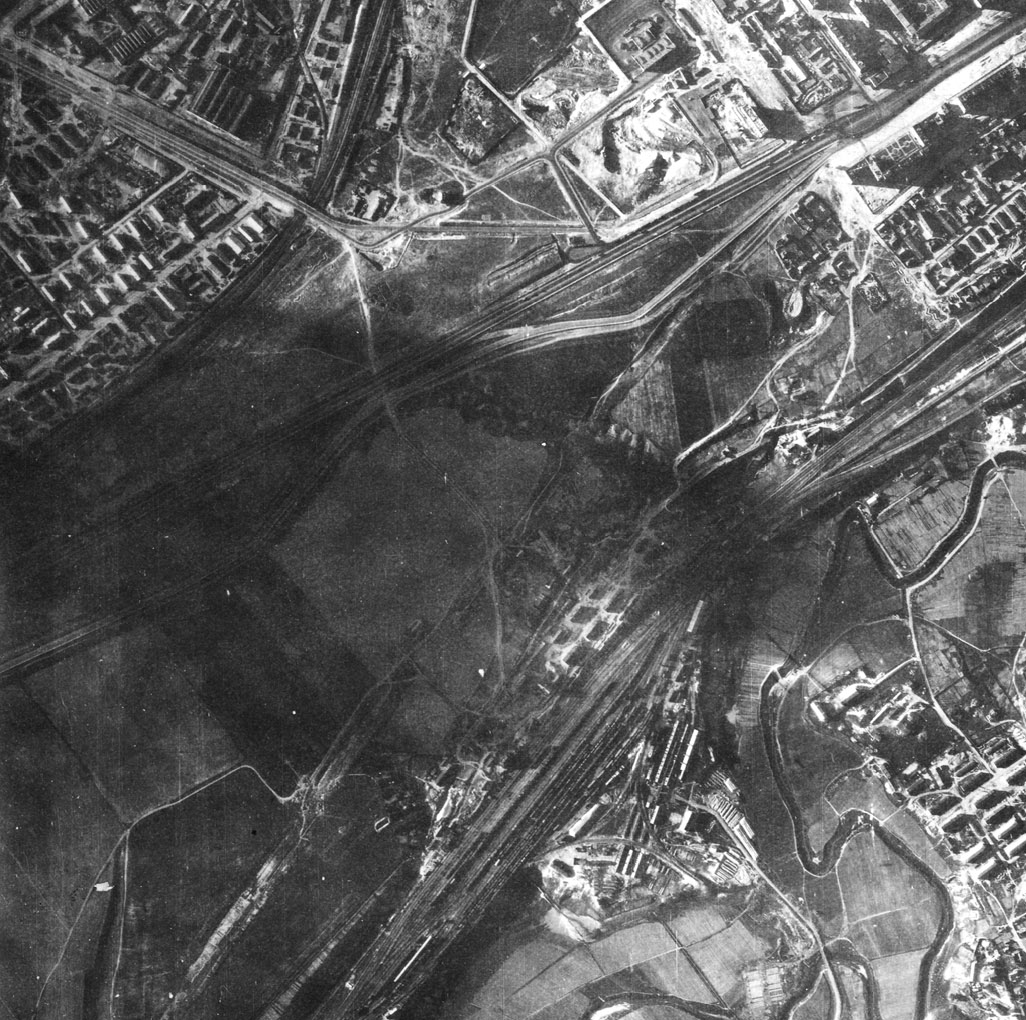
The site before the park was laid out, as seen in an aerial photograph from July 1941.

=== Modernity ===
In 2014, the territory of Victory Park came under the control of the Moscow Department of Culture in the form of a subordinate organization: the State Autonomous Cultural Institution of Moscow "Poklonnaya Gora."

The Victory Museum hosts an annual "Night of the Arts" event, during which the museum can be visited free of charge.

== Attractions ==
The monument was erected on June 22, 1995, at the intersection of Kutuzovsky Prospekt and Minskaya Street. It consists of a granite pedestal with three warriors: a богатырем from Ancient Rus', a guardsman from the war of 1812, and a soldier from the Great Patriotic War. They stand on an artificial hill, in front of which flowers are planted, forming the inscription "'Rus'."

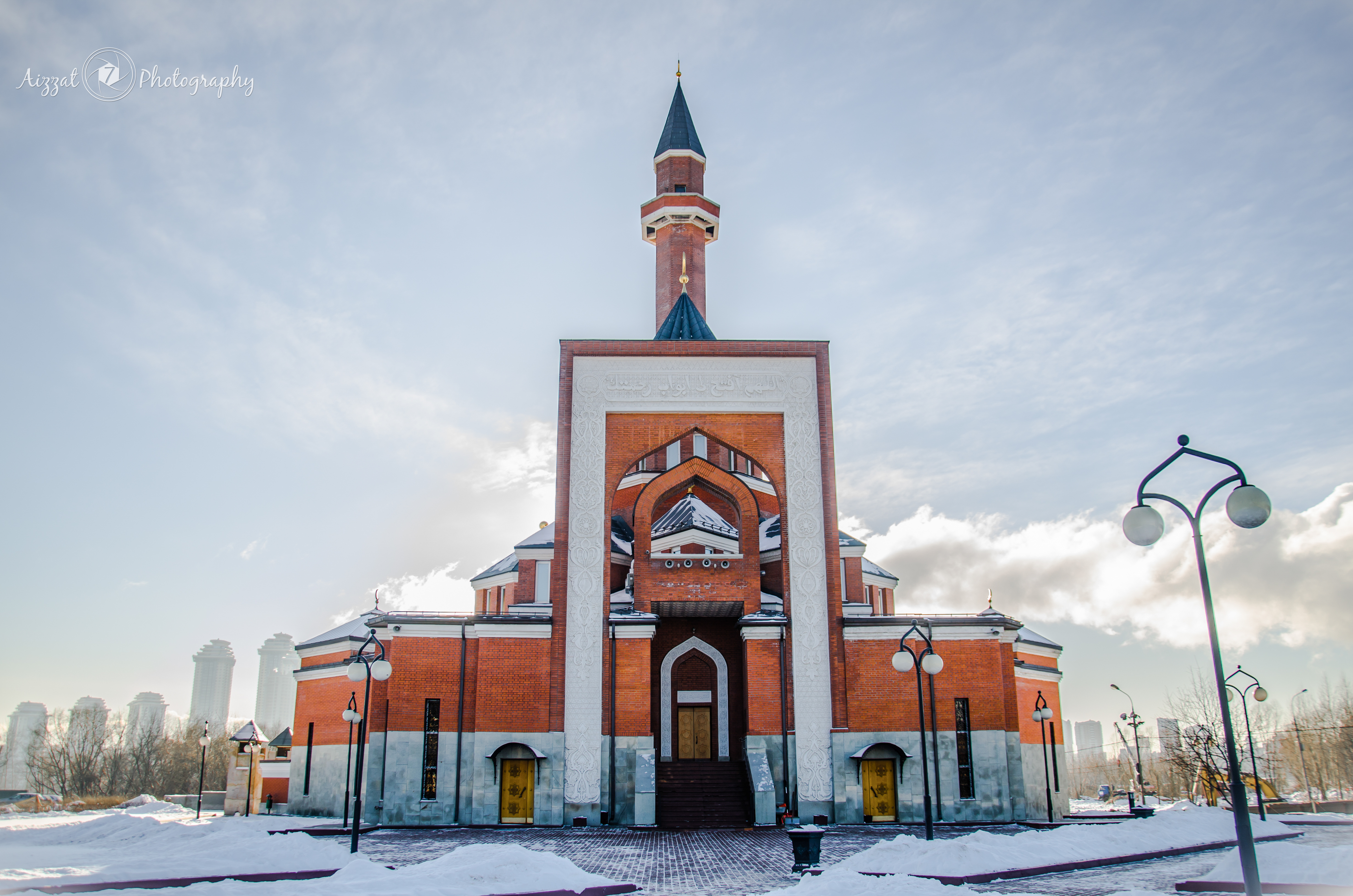
Memorial Mosque, 2014

== Key Monuments & Landmarks ==
- Victory Monument: A 141.8-meter-tall obelisk topped with Nike and a base sculpture of Saint George slaying a dragon.
- Triumphal Arch: A historic triumphal arch originally built between 1829 and 1834 to celebrate the victory over Napoleon and later moved to the park.
- Eternal Flame: A continuously burning eternal flame honoring fallen soldiers, on April 30, 2010 on the Winners Square.
- 1,418 Fountains: A long illuminated red fountain avenue representing each day of the Great Patriotic War.
- Open-Air Military Equipment Exhibition: A large collection of over 300 tanks, artillery pieces, and aircraft from World War II.
- Allies Monument: Commemorates the Anti-Hitler Coalition and the joint effort of the major Allied powers during World War II, opened on May 7, 2005.
- Holocaust Memorial Synagogue built in 1998 remembers the World War II Holocaust, opened on September 2, 1998.
- Monument to Missing Soldiers Without Graves.
- A golden-domed Orthodox church, the church of George the Victorious, was built in 1995, architect Anatoly Polyansky.
- Monument to the war dogs, opened on June 21, 2013.
- Monument to the participants of the accident at the Chernobyl Nuclear Power Plant.
- Monument to the heroes of World War I
