= Museum of the Great Patriotic War, Moscow =

History museum in Moscow, Russia

Museum of the Great Patriotic War
- Центральный музей Великой Отечественной войны
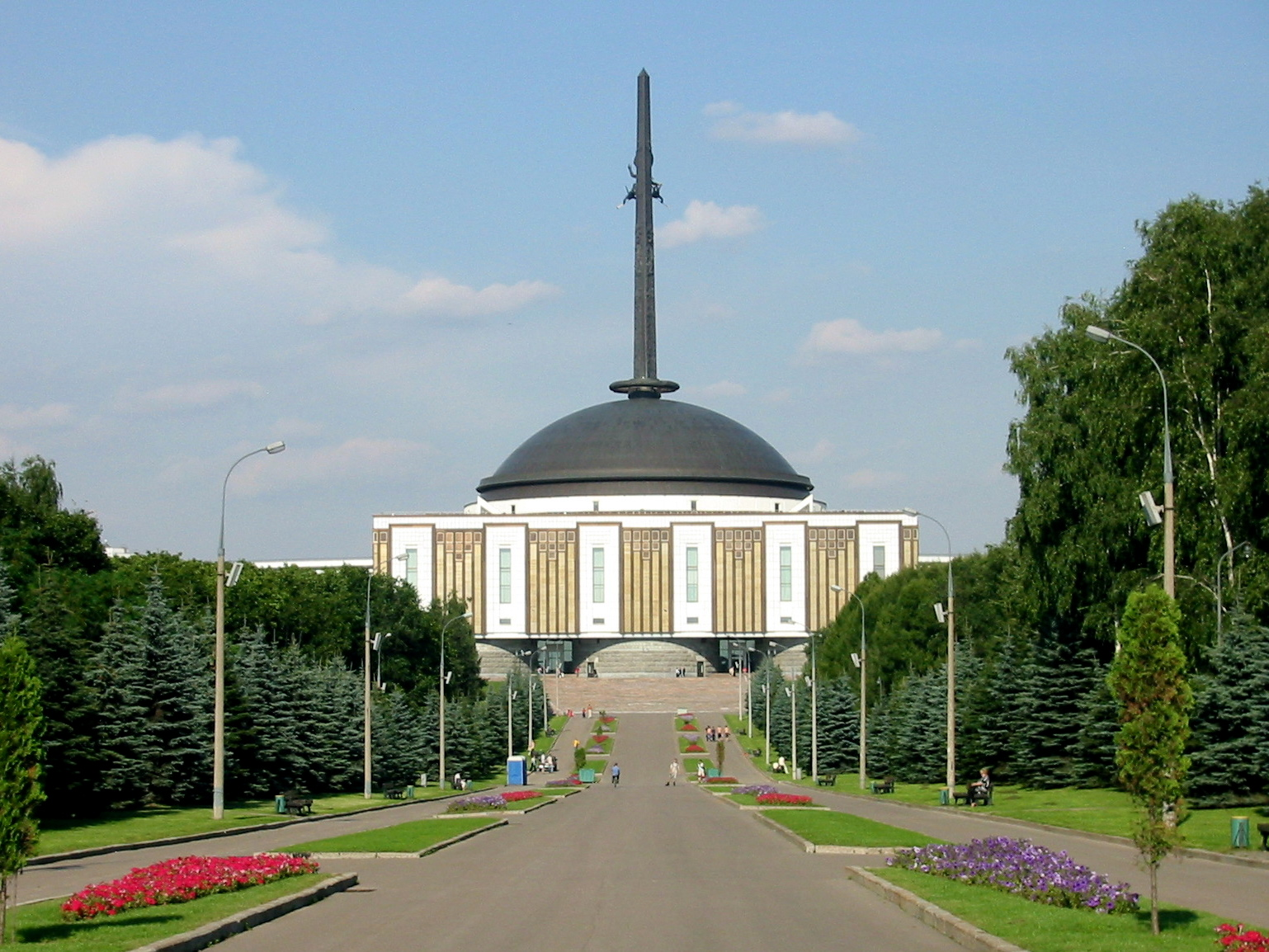

- Location in Moscow
- Established: 9 May 1995
- Location: 10 Brothers Fonchenko St, Moscow, Russian Federation, 121170
- Coordinates: 55°43′50″N 37°30′14″E
- Type: History museum
- Collection size: 75,090 items
- Visitors: 700,000 - 800,000 per year
- Director: Alexandr Shkolnik
- Curator: Andrey Fetisov
- Public transit access: Park Pobedy, Arbatsko-Pokrovskaya Line
- Website: https://victorymuseum.ru/

The Museum of the Great Patriotic War, also known as the Victory Museum (Russian: Музей Победы, romanized: Muzey Pobedy), is a history museum located in Moscow at Poklonnaya Gora. The building was designed by architect Anatoly Polyansky. Work on the museum began on March 3, 1986, and the museum was opened to the public on May 9, 1995. The museum features exhibits and memorials concerning the Eastern Front of World War II, known in Russia as the "Great Patriotic War".

== Exhibits ==
The museum features 14,143 square meters of exhibit space for permanent collections and an additional 5,500 square meters for temporary exhibits. Near the entry to the museum is the Hall of Commanders, which features a decorative "Sword and Shield of Victory" and bronze busts of recipients of the Order of Victory, the highest military honor awarded by the Soviet Union.

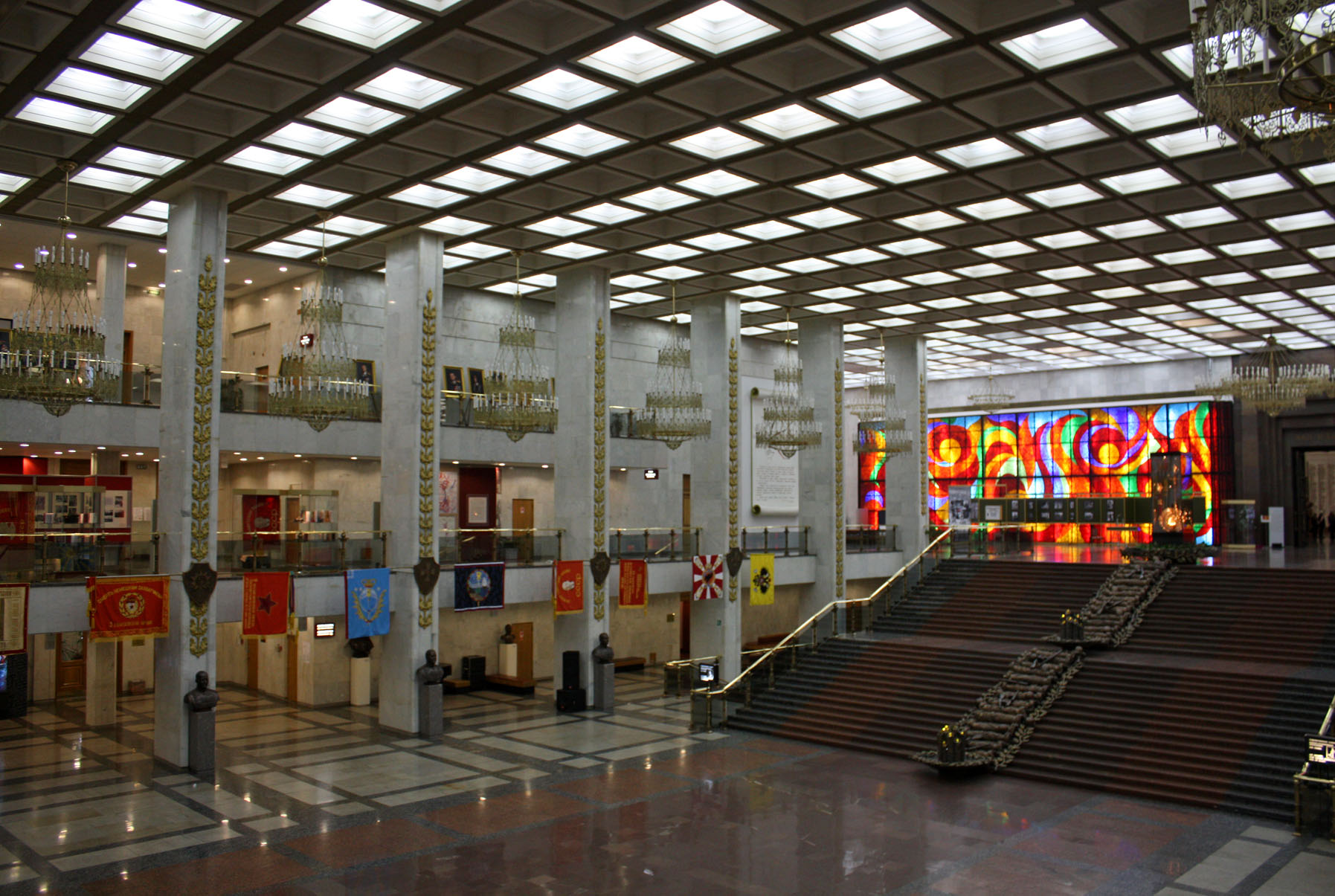
The Hall of Commanders

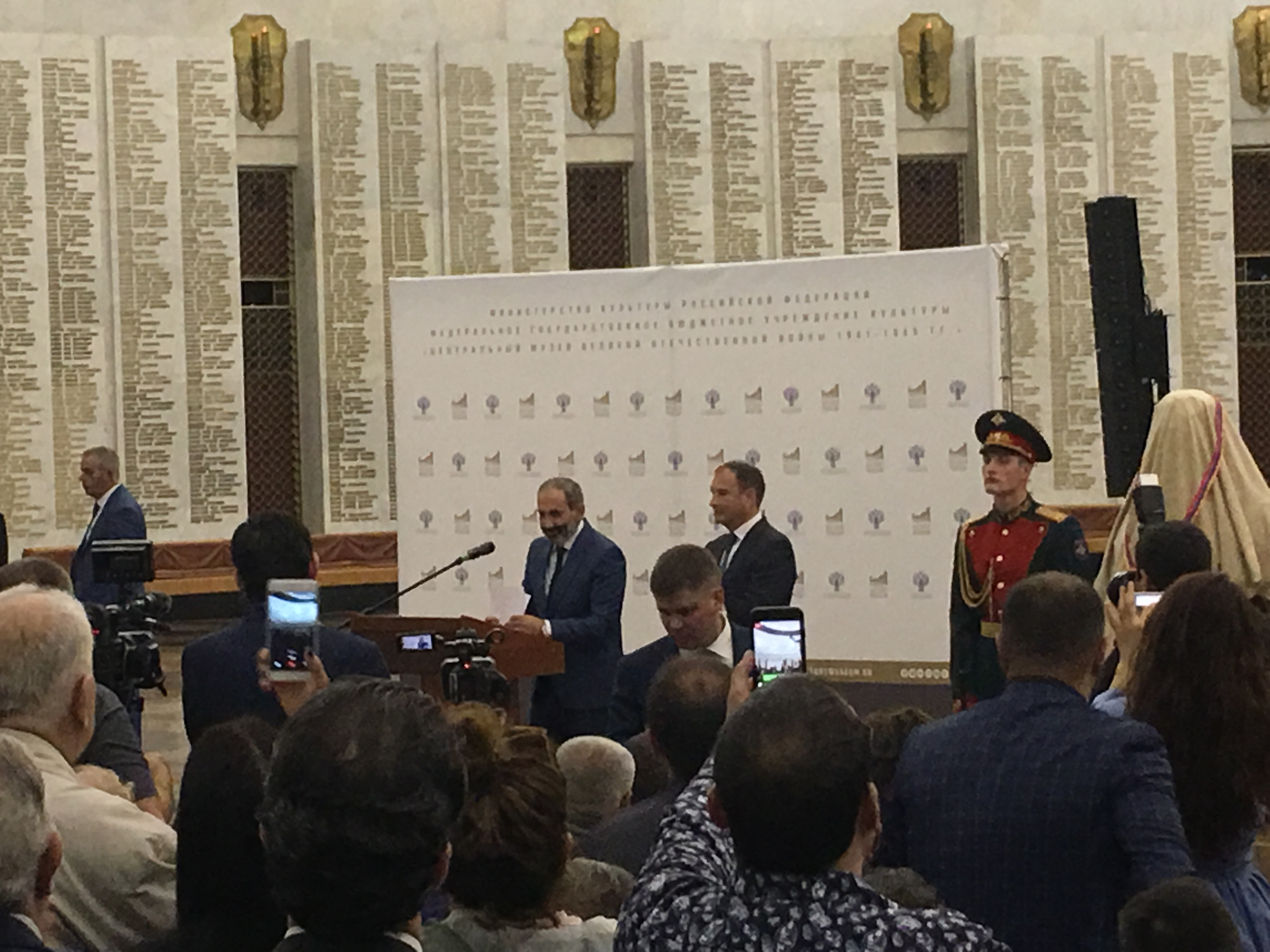
Nikol Pashinyan at the Museum.

== Setting ==
The museum is set in Victory Park, a 2,424-hectare park on Poklonnaya Hill. The park features a large, paved plaza, fountains, and open space where military vehicles, cannons, and other apparatus from World War II are displayed. Also in the park are the Holocaust Memorial Synagogue, the Church of St. George, the Moscow Memorial Mosque, a triumphal arch, an obelisk, and a number of sculptures.
