= Memorial Mosque =

Mosque in Moscow, Russia

- Мемориальная мечеть
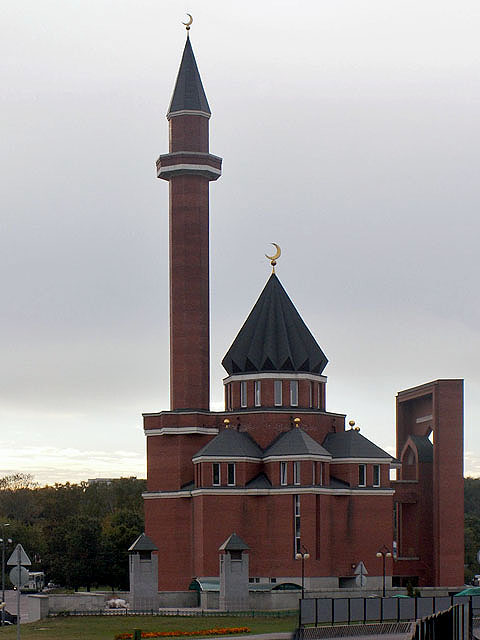

Religion
- Affiliation: Islam
- Region: Moscow
- Status: active

Location
- Country: Russia
- Interactive map of Memorial Mosque
- Coordinates: 55.72527778°N 37.49694444°E

The Memorial Mosque (Russian: Мемориальная мечеть) is a mosque, built in 1997 in memory of the Muslim soldiers who died on the Eastern Front of World War II. It is located in Victory Park on Poklonnaya Hill in the Western Administrative Okrug of Moscow, Russia. The designer of the building is Ilyas Tazhiev.

Since 2012, the imam has been Rinat Alyautdinov.

== Activities ==
The mosque hosts a Sunday school for adults and children. Tours are available for visitors.
