= Monument to Warriors-Internationalists =

Afghan War Monument in Moscow, Russia

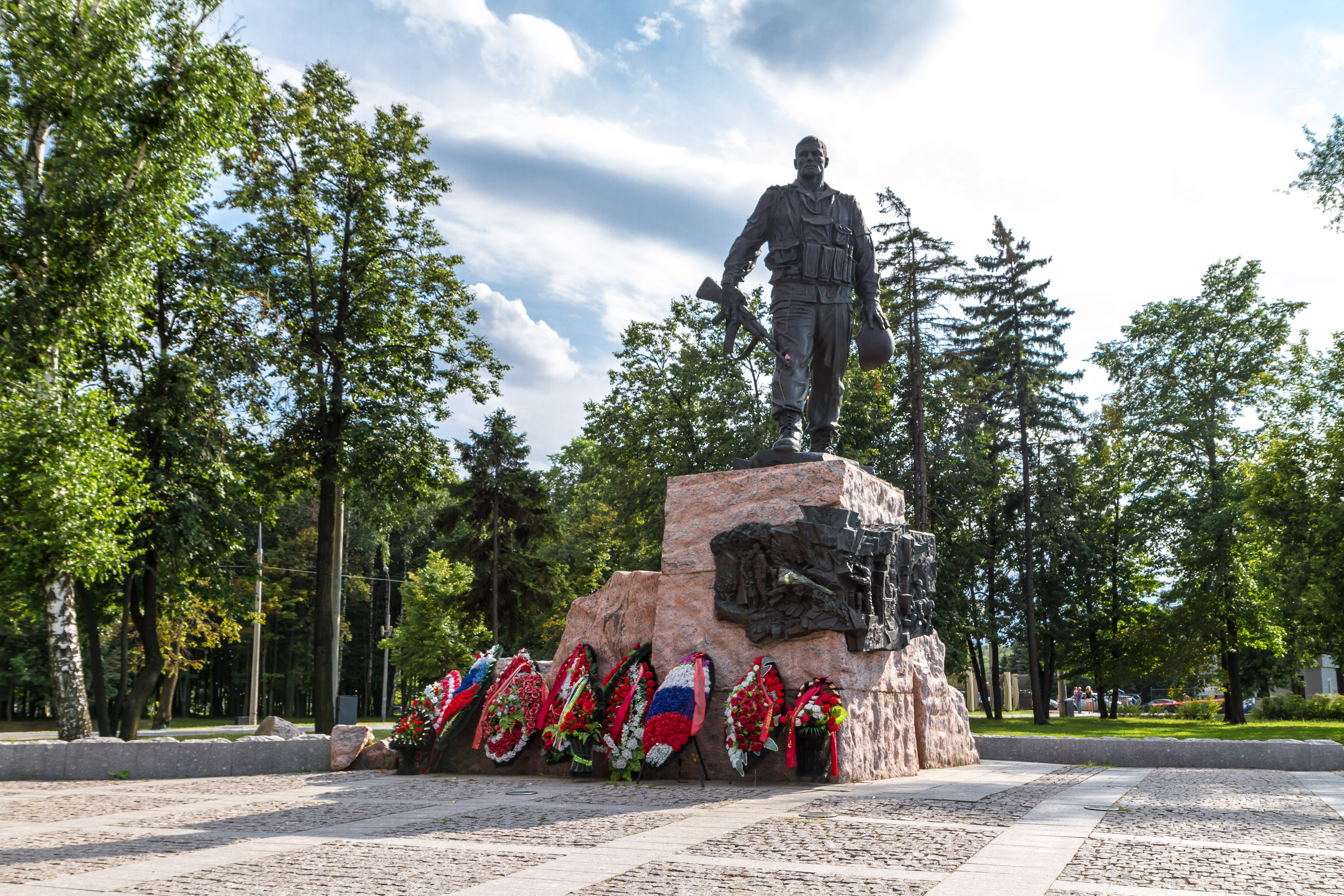
- Monument to Warriors-Internationalists on Poklonnaya Hill
- 55°43′53″N 37°29′40″E
- Location: Victory Park, Moscow, Russia
- Designer: sculptors: S. A. Shcherbakov, S. S. Shcherbakov architects: Yu. P. Grigoriev, S. Grigoriev
- Material: Bronze

The Monument to Warriors-Internationalists is a bronze statue dedicated to the veterans of the Afghan War located in Moscow on Poklonnaya Hill in the Victory Park.

== History ==
The Monument to Warriors-Internationalists was created with donations from organizations of veterans of the Afghan war, with personal contributions from internationalist soldiers with the support of the Moscow government. The authors of the monument were sculptors S. A. Shcherbakov and S. S. Shcherbakov, architects Yu. P. Grigoriev and S. Grigoriev.

The monument is a four-meter bronze figure of a young Soviet soldier in camouflage uniform with a helmet in his left hand and a rifle in his right. The soldier is depicted approaching a cliff and looking into the distance. The figure of a warrior stands on a pedestal made of red granite. A bronze bas-relief with a battle scene is installed on the pedestal.

The opening of the monument took place on December 27, 2004 and was timed to coincide with the 25th anniversary of the introduction of Soviet troops into Afghanistan. The opening ceremony of the monument was attended by Afghan veterans, special forces who stormed Amin's palace, and representatives of veterans' organizations.

== Gallery ==
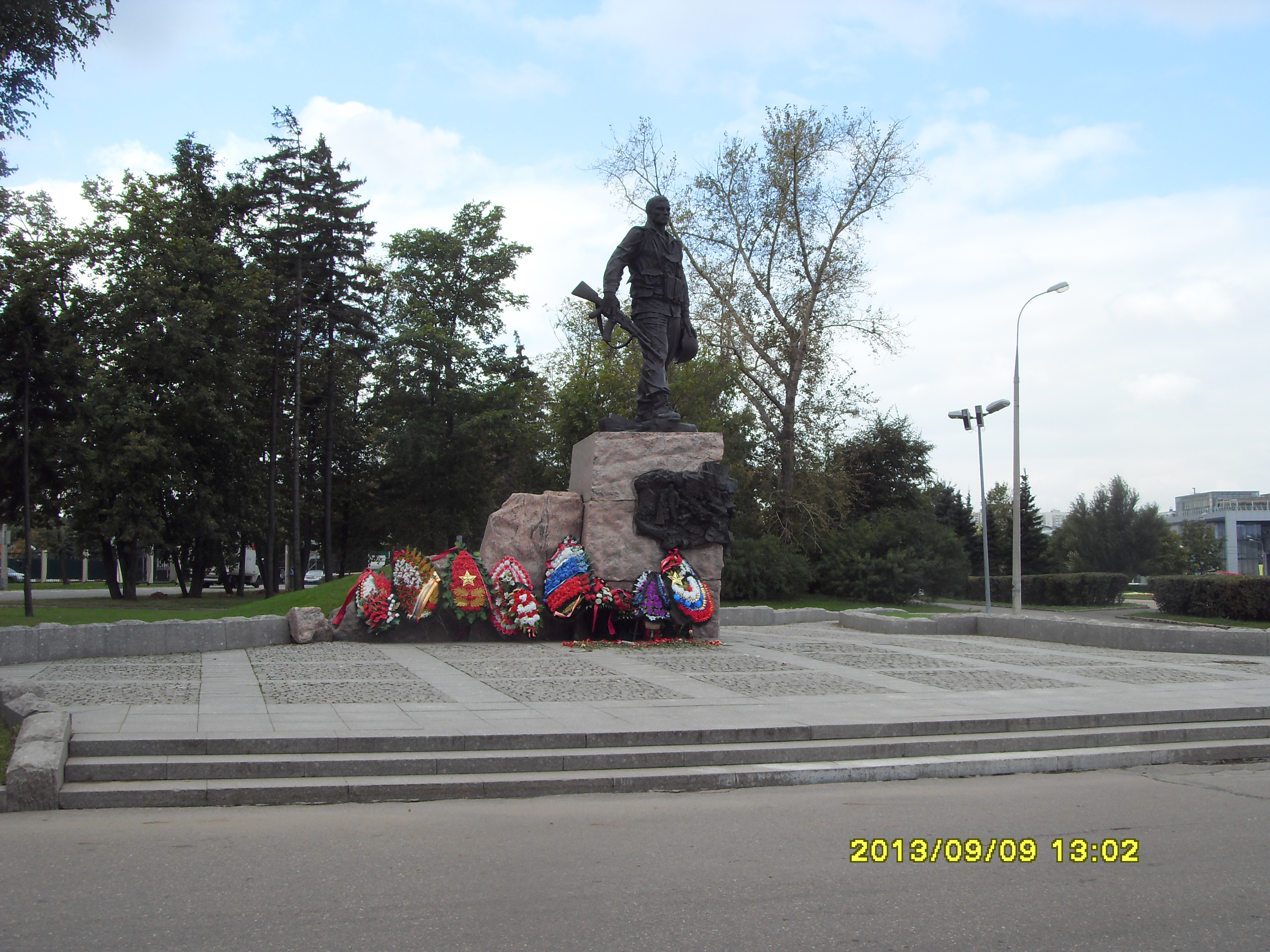
Different angle

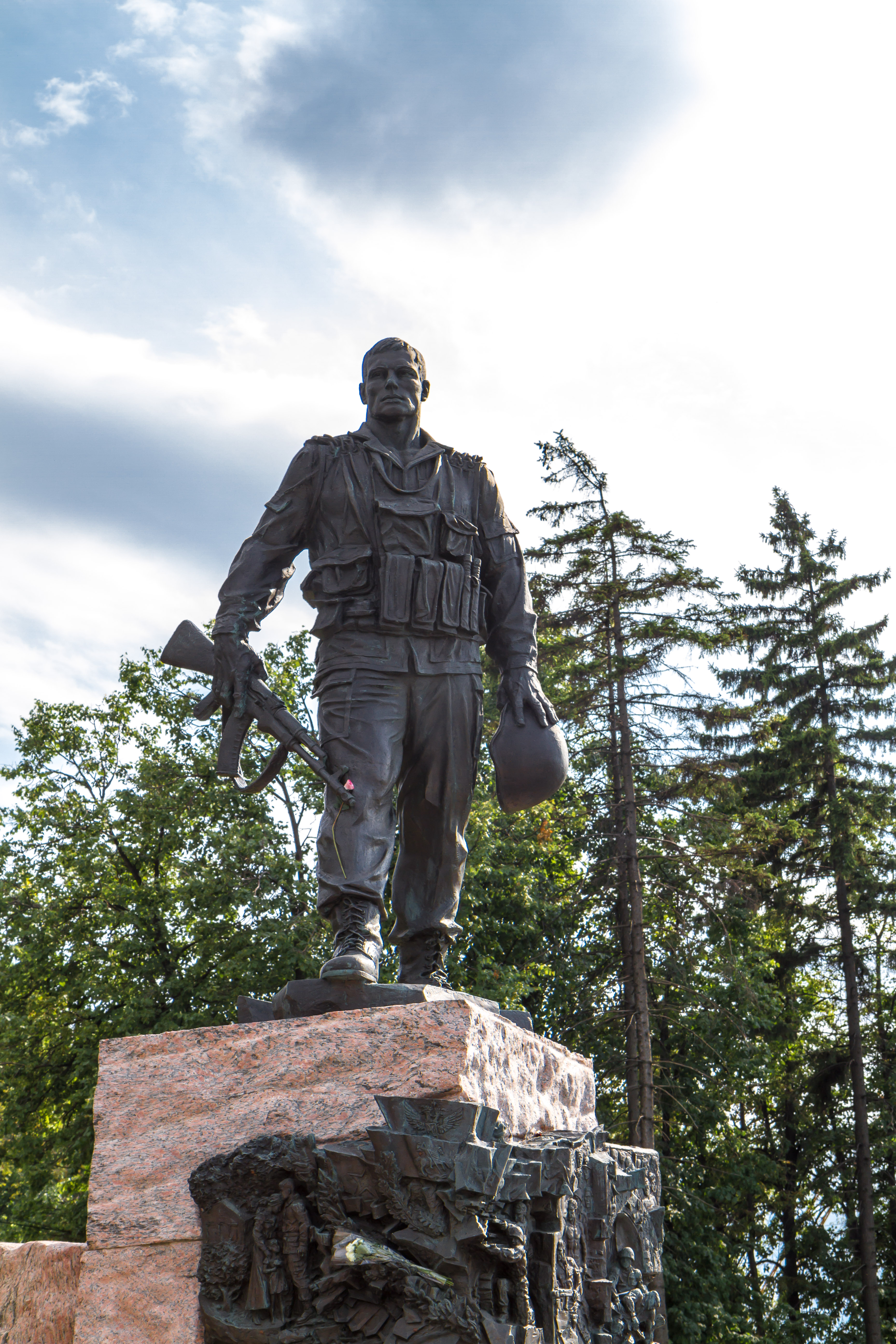
Close up of the sculpture
