= Yalta Intourist =

Hotel in Yalta

- Ялта-Интурист
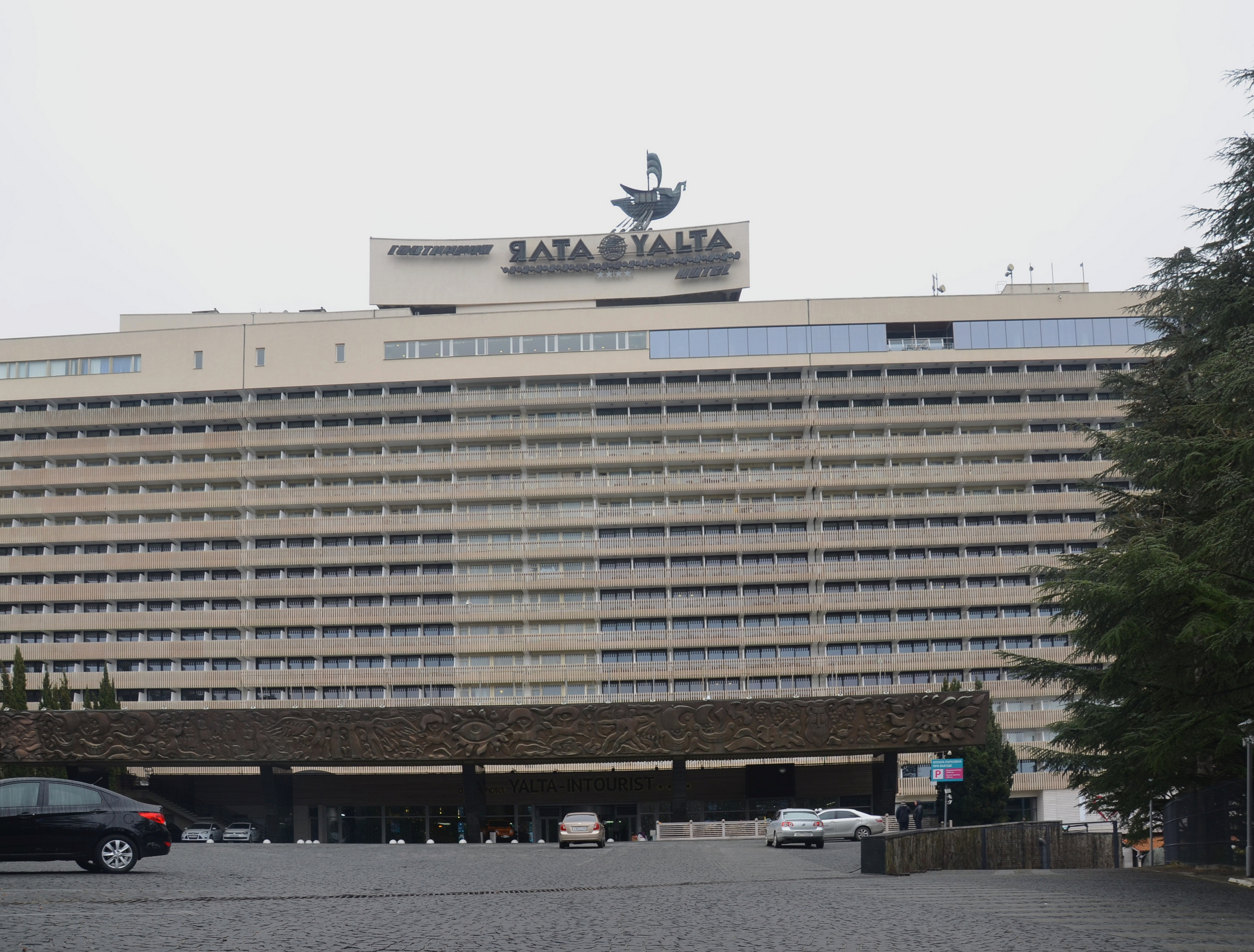
- Interactive map of the Yalta Intourist area

General information
- Location: Yalta
- Coordinates: 44°30′10″N 34°11′26″E
- Construction started: 1974
- Completed: 1977

Design and construction
- Architect: Anatoly Polyansky

Yalta Intourist (Russian: Гостиничный комплекс «Ялта-Интурист») is a hotel complex in Yalta, set in the center of Massandra Park on the Black Sea coast. It is one of the major tourist centers in Crimea, and was known as the largest hotel in Ukraine before being taken over during the Russian annexation of Crimea in 2014.

== History ==
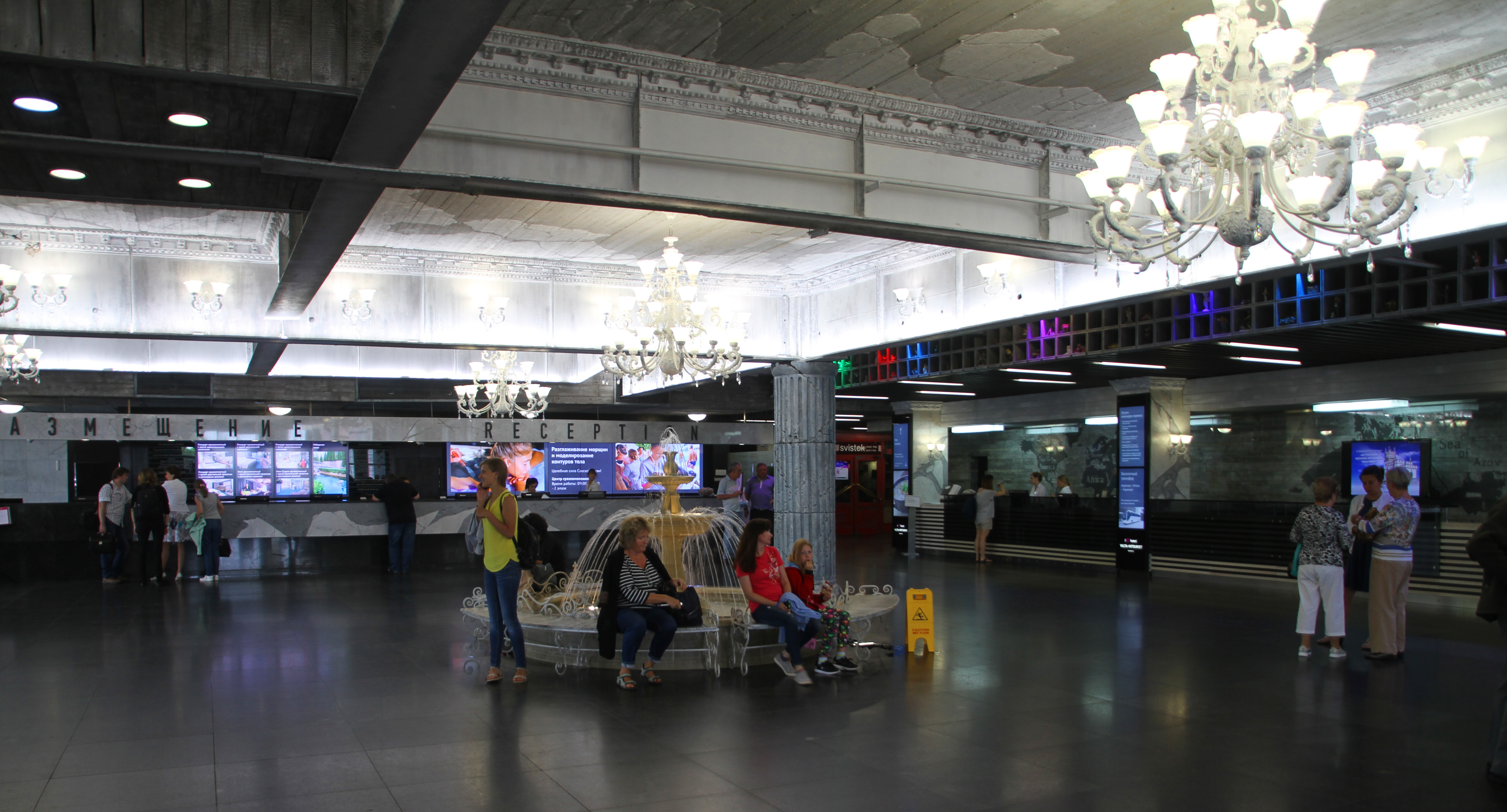
Hotel lobby with a fountain

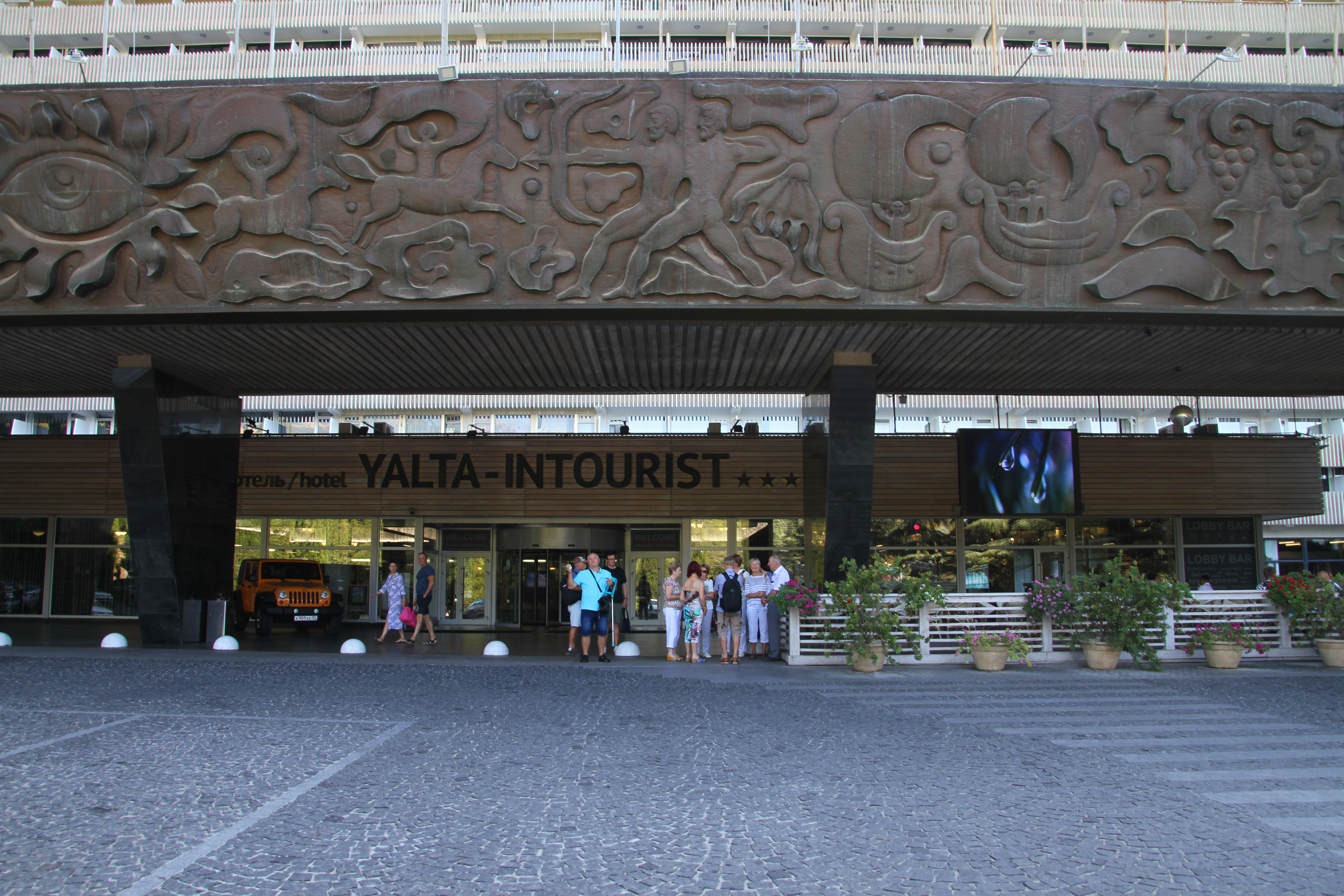
Hotel exterior designed by Zurab Tsereteli

=== Soviet era ===
The Yalta Intourist Hotel was constructed under the Soviet Era and managed under the intourist system, allowing it to receive foreign tourists. The cost of the hotel was around $84 million.

The hotel was built in 1977 by local construction company Krymspetsstroy and Union Engineering INGA from Yugoslavia.

The design work was performed by A.T. Polyansky, member of the USSR Academy of Fine Arts, architect I.N. Mokshunova, and civil engineers K.N. Vasiliev and Ya.I. Dukhovny. The concept of the hotel exterior and interior decoration was developed with the participation of Zurab Tsereteli, a muralist, painter and sculptor.

According to a report from the Los Angeles Times in 1986, Yalta Intourist is special during the Cold War because "unlike Intourist hotels in other parts of Russia, Westerners are mixed with citizens of the Eastern Bloc...I saw East and West Germans, Poles, Czechs, Russians, British and Americans, all there to enjoy their holidays."

The New York Times also praised the Yalta Intourist for its infrastructure, writing that, "Bathrooms, often dingy and rusting in Soviet hotels, are pleasantly clean...Direct-dial telephones that could be used to reach other cities in the Soviet Union and swift operator assistance in placing international calls were other pluses."

=== Post-Cold War period ===
In September 2013, the hotel, which was owned by the Industrial Union of Donbass, was purchased by Soyuz Marines Group under Russian businessman Alexander Kulikov through the use of offshore company Delphshirre Holdings Limited.

According to the Ministry of Economy of Crimea, the reconstruction cost of Yalty Intourist is estimated to be at around $125 million.

== Infrastructure ==
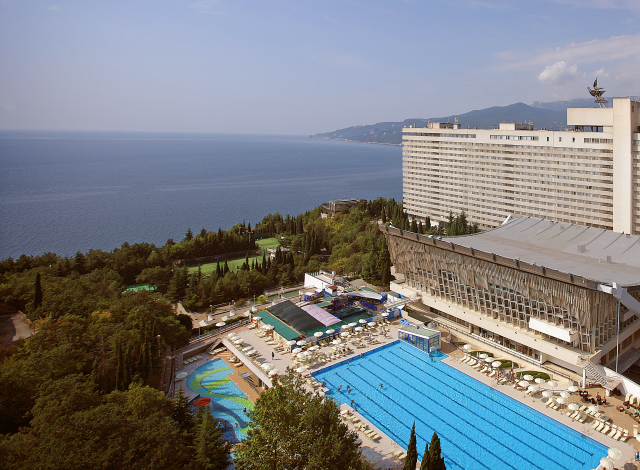
Yalta Intourist at the Black Sea coast with multiple swimming pools

Yalta Intourist is 17-story high and has 2,400 beds during the Soviet era. The hotel has 1,294 rooms of which 1,140 rooms are being used today. It also has its own beach, three swimming pools, and 16 restaurants.

In May 2010, the beach at Yalta Intourist was awarded the Blue Flag by the Foundation for Environmental Education (FEE).

The Ministry of Resorts and Tourism of Crimea awarded the status of health resort to Yalta Intourist in 2013. Therapeutic mud baths opened in the hotel in November 2013.

In March 2023, the reconstruction of the restaurant "Marble" was completed. The number of seats increased from 700 to 1,000. Marble is the largest restaurant in Russia when it opened. The total area of the renovated hall is 2,500 square meter, and the kitchen has an area of 1,200 square meter.

In June 2025, the beach at the hotel complex, which has fell into disrepair, have been reconstructed and once again opened to the public. The new beach is named "Emerald" and is 300 meters long.

== Appearance in films ==
As one of the largest hotels in the Soviet Union, Yalta Intourist appeared in Soviet films and modern Russian dramas.

In 1979, the hotel was used in the filming of Pirates of the 20th Century, in which the scene of a sinking dry cargo ship was filmed in the hotel's swimming pool. The cult Soviet crime film in 1987, Assa, was also filmed in the hotel.
