= Swedish Holocaust Museum =

- Sveriges museum om Förintelsen
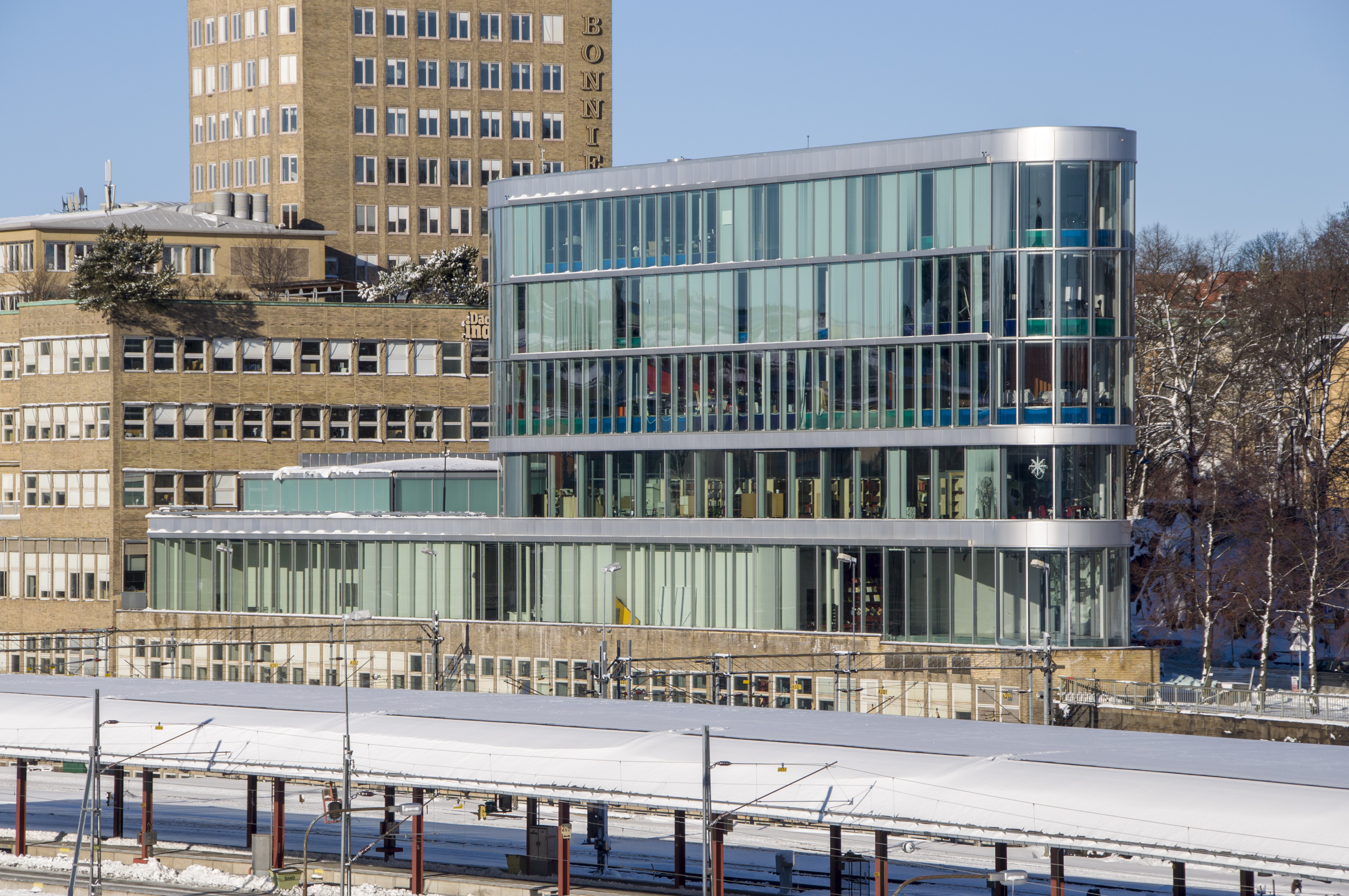
- Established: 21 June 2023
- Location: Torsgatan 19, Stockholm, Sweden
- Coordinates: 59.33716°N 18.0423°E
- Type: Holocaust museum
- Director: Katherine Hauptman
- Website: museumforintelsen.se

Swedish Holocaust Museum (Swedish: Sveriges museum om Förintelsen) is a state historical museum in Stockholm focused on the Holocaust. The museum is currently headed by Katherine Hauptman and located at Torsgatan 19 in central Stockholm.

== History ==
The idea of museum was proposed in 2018 by Polish-born Holocaust survivor Max Safir. The Swedish Ministry of Culture announced in 2020 that $1.1 million would be allocated to the Living History Forum to establish a Holocaust museum focusing on survivors living in Sweden as well as a separate "center" devoted to the memory of the Swedish diplomat Raoul Wallenberg. In 2021, the government commissioned the State Historical Museums to submit proposals for the establishment of Sweden's Holocaust Museum as a museum within the authority. One point was that stories from survivors with connections to Sweden should be at the center of the activity.

In March 2021, the Swedish government also assigned the Living History Forum to collect objects and stories from survivors and their lives in Sweden for the Swedish Holocaust Museum. The collection was then handed over to the museum, which has since continued to collect objects and stories related to Sweden and the Holocaust.

In June 2022, the museum was inaugurated by the Swedish Minister of Culture, Jeanette Gustafsdotter.

As of 2025, development of a concrete proposal for the museum's permanent location and a dialogue with the City of Stockholm and other stakeholders is ongoing.

== Exhibitions ==
On June 21, 2023, the museum's first exhibition, Seven Lives, opened to the public at Torsgatan 19. It focused on seven life stories of people who, against all odds, survived the Holocaust and came to Sweden. The exhibition was on display until March 2, 2025.

On December 12, 2024, the exhibition Untold opened. It begins with the resistance in the Roma section of Auschwitz-Birkenau in 1944 and tells the story of the genocide of the Roma and Sinti folk groups. In the exhibition, visitors encounter previously untold testimonies, the story of the few who survived and the long road to recognition.

On April 25, 2025, the exhibition In Black and White opened. The exhibition explores Swedish media and the Holocaust—what was written and broadcast, but also what was edited out. It also highlights the spirit of the times, the Swedish media landscape, and the presence of antisemitism in the Swedish society.

== Digital presence ==
In June 2022, the museum launched its website with the digital exhibition Dimensions in Testimony, featuring interactive biographies of two Holocaust survivors. Using AI technology, it enables conversation-like interactions with survivors Tobias Rawet and Elisabeth Citrom based on their testimonies. Dimentions in Testiomony can also be experienced at the museum and has two additional English-speaking testimonies by Pinchas Gutter and Eva Kor. The Swedish version of Dimensions in Testimony is a collaboration with the USC Shoah Foundation, which developed the technology and concept, and Jewish Culture in Sweden.

The website also includes an extensive knowledge base with information about the White Buses rescue operation, antisemitism, survivor stories, as well as educational materials.
