= Anatoly Polyansky =

Soviet architect (1928–1993)

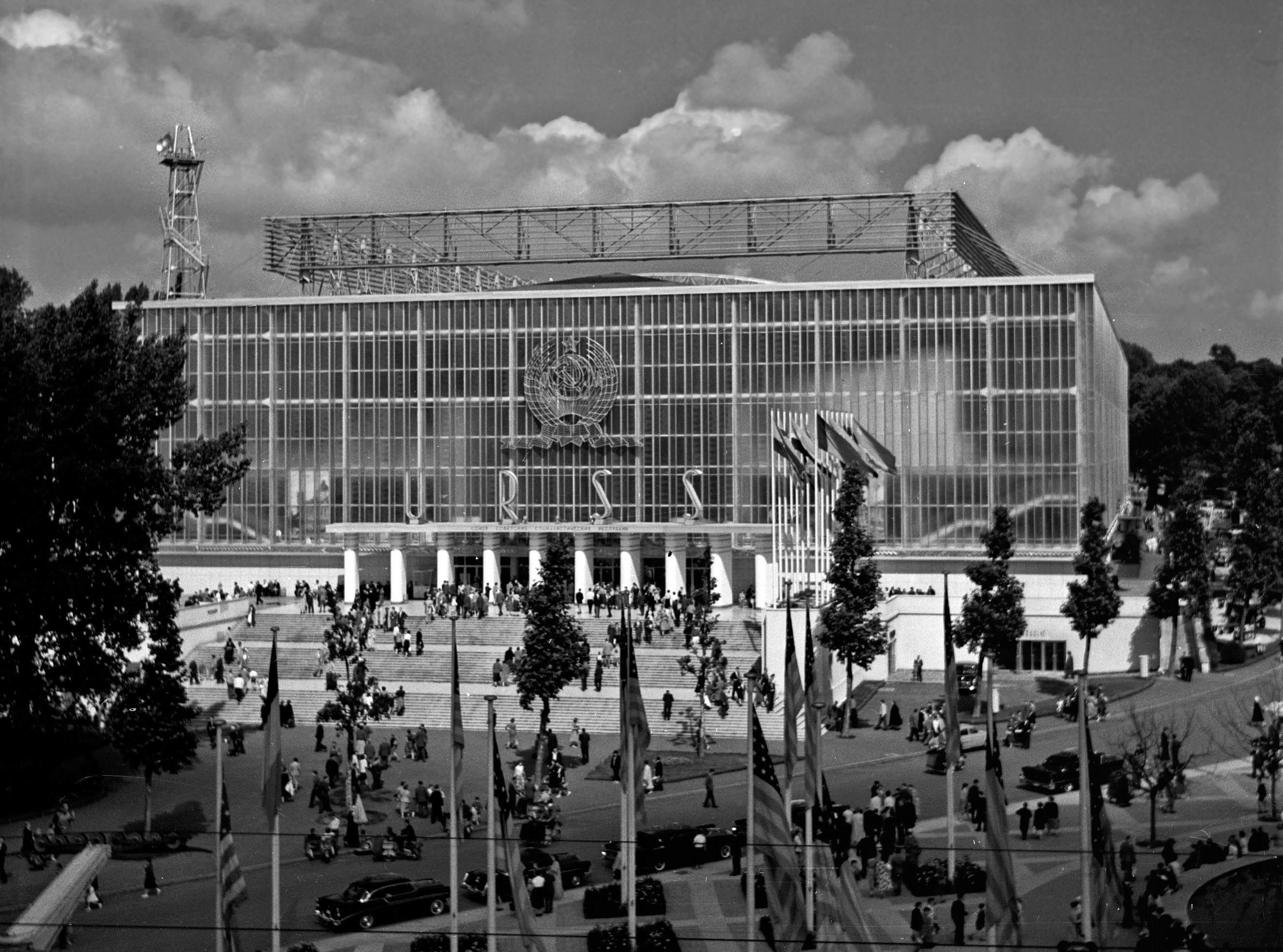
Pavilion of the USSR on the International World Fair in Brussels (Grand Prix) in 1958.

Anatoly Trofimovich Polyansky (Russian: Анатолий Трофимович Полянский; 29 January 1928, Avdiivka – 7 June 1993, Moscow) was a Soviet and Russian architect.

== Work ==
Polyansky gained prominence from his design of the USSR's pavilion at the International World Fair in Brussels in 1958. He also designed Artek in Crimea, the Museum of the Great Patriotic War, Moscow, the Yalta Hotel Complex and the USSR embassy buildings in Greece, Sweden and Egypt.

== Awards and honors ==
- USSR State Prize (1967)
- Order of the October Revolution (1976)
- Lenin Komsomol Prize (1978)
- People's Architect of the USSR (1980)
- State Prize of the Russian Federation (1996, posthumous)
- Order of the Red Banner of Labour
