= Holocaust museum =

The term Holocaust museum may refer to:

- Adelaide Holocaust Museum and Andrew Steiner Education Centre, Adelaide, South Australia
- Ani Ma'amin Holocaust Museum, Jerusalem
- Cape Town Holocaust Centre, Cape Town, South Africa
- Centro Israelita do Paraná, Curitiba, Paraná, Brazil
- Dallas Holocaust Museum/Center for Education & Tolerance, Dallas, Texas, US
- Dutch National Holocaust Museum, Amsterdam, The Netherlands
- Florida Holocaust Museum, St. Petersburg, Florida, US
- Ghetto Fighters' House, Western Galilee, Israel
- Holocaust Education Center, Hiroshima, Japan
- Holocaust Memorial Center (Budapest), Budapest, Hungary
- Holocaust Memorial Center, Farmington Hills, Michigan, US
- Holocaust Memorial Center for the Jews of Macedonia, Skopje, North Macedonia
- Holocaust Museum Houston, Houston, Texas, US
- Illinois Holocaust Museum and Education Center, Skokie, Illinois, US
- Jewish Holocaust Centre, Melbourne, Australia
- Johannesburg Holocaust and Genocide Centre, Johannesburg, South Africa
- Los Angeles Museum of the Holocaust, Los Angeles, US
- Montreal Holocaust Memorial Centre, Montreal, Canada
- Simon Wiesenthal Center, Los Angeles, US
- Swedish Holocaust Museum, Stockholm
- Sydney Jewish Museum, Sydney, Australia
- United States Holocaust Memorial Museum, Washington, D.C., US
- Virginia Holocaust Museum, Richmond, Virginia, US
- Yad Vashem, Jerusalem

== See also ==
- Jewish Museum, Berlin
- List of Holocaust memorials and museums
- America's Black Holocaust Museum
