= Holocaust Memorial Synagogue (Moscow) =

Orthodox synagogue and museum in Moscow, Russia

- Russian: Московская Мемориальная синагога
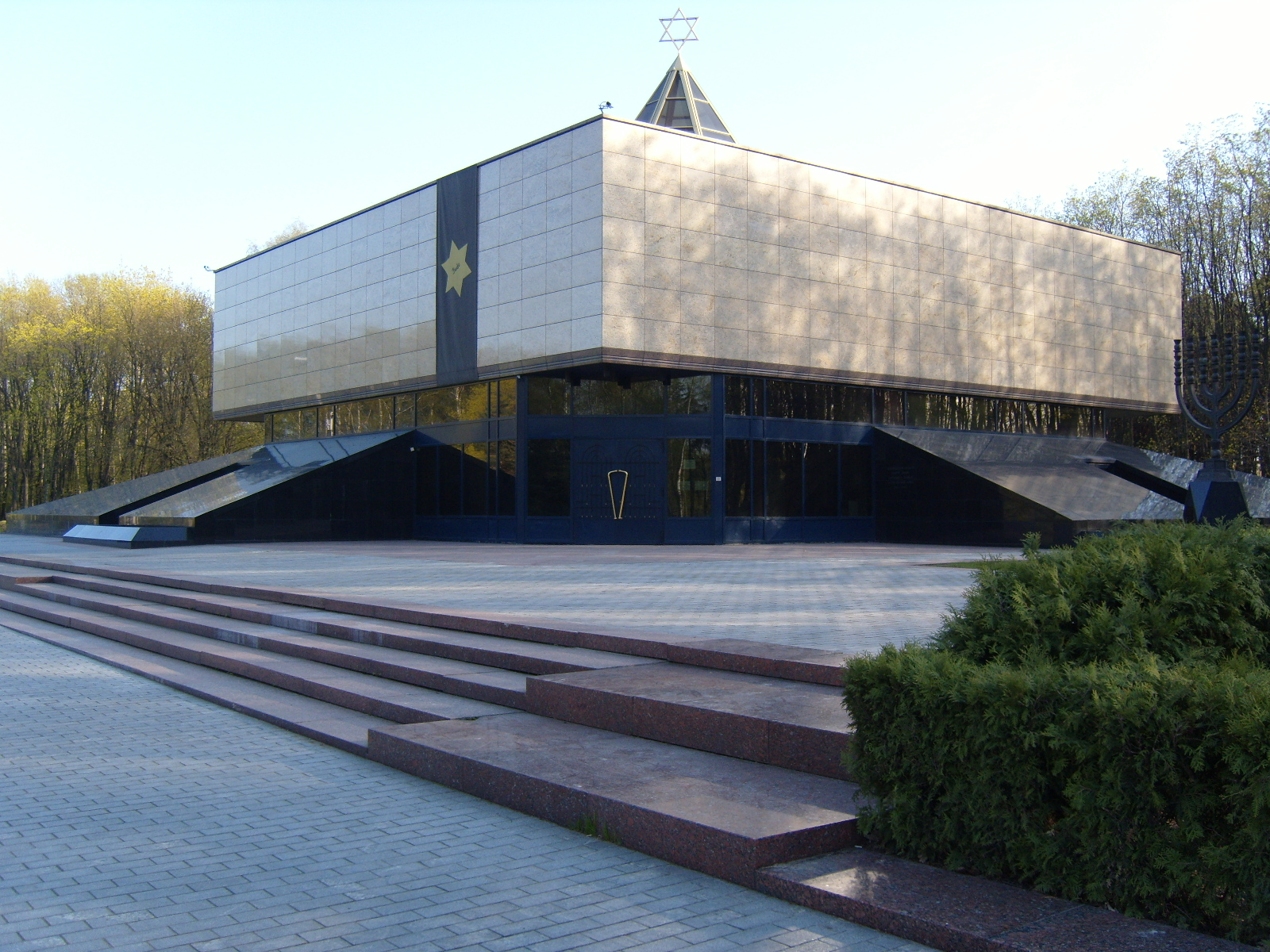
- The synagogue and museum in 2008

- Location of the synagogue and museum in Moscow

Religion
- Affiliation: Orthodox Judaism
- Rite: Nusach Ashkenaz
- Ecclesiastical or organizational status: Synagogue; Holocaust museum
- Status: Active

Location
- Location: 53 Kutuzovsky Avenue, Poklonnaya Hill, Moscow
- Country: Russia
- Interactive map of Holocaust Memorial Synagogue
- Coordinates: 55°43′48″N 37°29′45″E

Architecture
- Architects: Moshe Zarhy (Zarhy Architects); Frank Meisler (interior)
- Type: Synagogue architecture
- Style: Modernist
- Groundbreaking: 1958
- Completed: 1998
- Materials: Brick

The Holocaust Memorial Synagogue (Russian: Московская Мемориальная синагога; Hebrew: בית הכנסת לזכר השואה) is an Orthodox Jewish congregation, synagogue, and Holocaust museum, located at 53 Kutuzovsky Avenue, on Poklonnaya Hill in Moscow, Russia. It was built in 1998 to complement a Russian Orthodox church and a mosque that are also part of the outdoor museum dedicated to Russia's victory in World War II.

== History ==
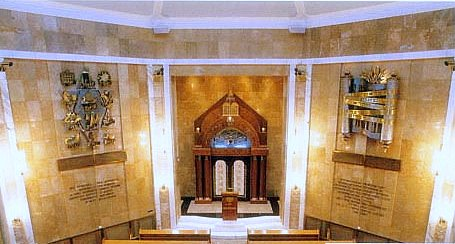
Interior view

The building of the Temple of the Memory on Poklonnaya Gora, a flat hill in the West of Moscow, between the Setun River and another hill, was constructed and opened in September 1998 in Boris Yeltsin's presence. The construction of the Temple of Memory was financed by the Russian Jewish Congress – a non-profit charitable fund and the largest secular organisation of Russian Jews.

The Temple of memory architect was Moshe Zarhy (Zarhy Architects) from Israel. In the Holocaust Memorial Synagogue there is a hall with a balcony, the offices for the rabbi and a library. An exhibition about history of the Jewish people and the Holocaust was located in the building. The building is also used as a museum.

The interior of the building was designed by Frank Meisler. Meisler created wall sculptures showing Jerusalem, the Twelve Tribes of Israel and the Five Books of Moses.

== Dedication and exhibitions ==
The synagogue is the only one of its kind in the Russian Federation. The permanent exhibition in the building's premises shows everyday objects from Jewish life, some dating back to the time of the first Jews in Russia, and thus testifies to the Jewish contribution to the cultural and economic development of Russia. The tragic side of Jewish history is also part of the exhibition, which is not just about the Holocaust: in pre-revolutionary Russia, over 400 laws and ordinances were in force that restricted the rights of Jews, especially in the areas of work, settlement, culture, education and practice of religious traditions. A significant part of the exhibition is dedicated to the history of the Holocaust. On display are mainly objects and documents that testify to the Nazi occupation and the fate of the ghetto inhabitants and the death camps. In addition, the history of the Jewish partisans and the Jewish heroes of the Soviet Union is documented in the synagogue.

A separate section of the exhibition is dedicated to Russians, Ukrainians, and Belarusians who helped Jews in the occupied territories (and were subsequently honored as Righteous Among the Nations).

The Memorial Synagogue Museum offers excursions, lectures and film screenings about the lives of Jews in Russia and about the Holocaust. In addition to documenting Jewish history in Russia, the explicit goal is to promote tolerance and awareness of history. There is close cooperation in this area with the Russian Research and Education Center "Holocaust".

== See also ==
- History of the Jews in Moscow
- List of synagogues in Russia
- Russian Research and Educational Holocaust Center
