= Poklonnaya Hill =

Hill in Moscow, Russia

Coordinates: 55°43′54″N 37°30′24″E

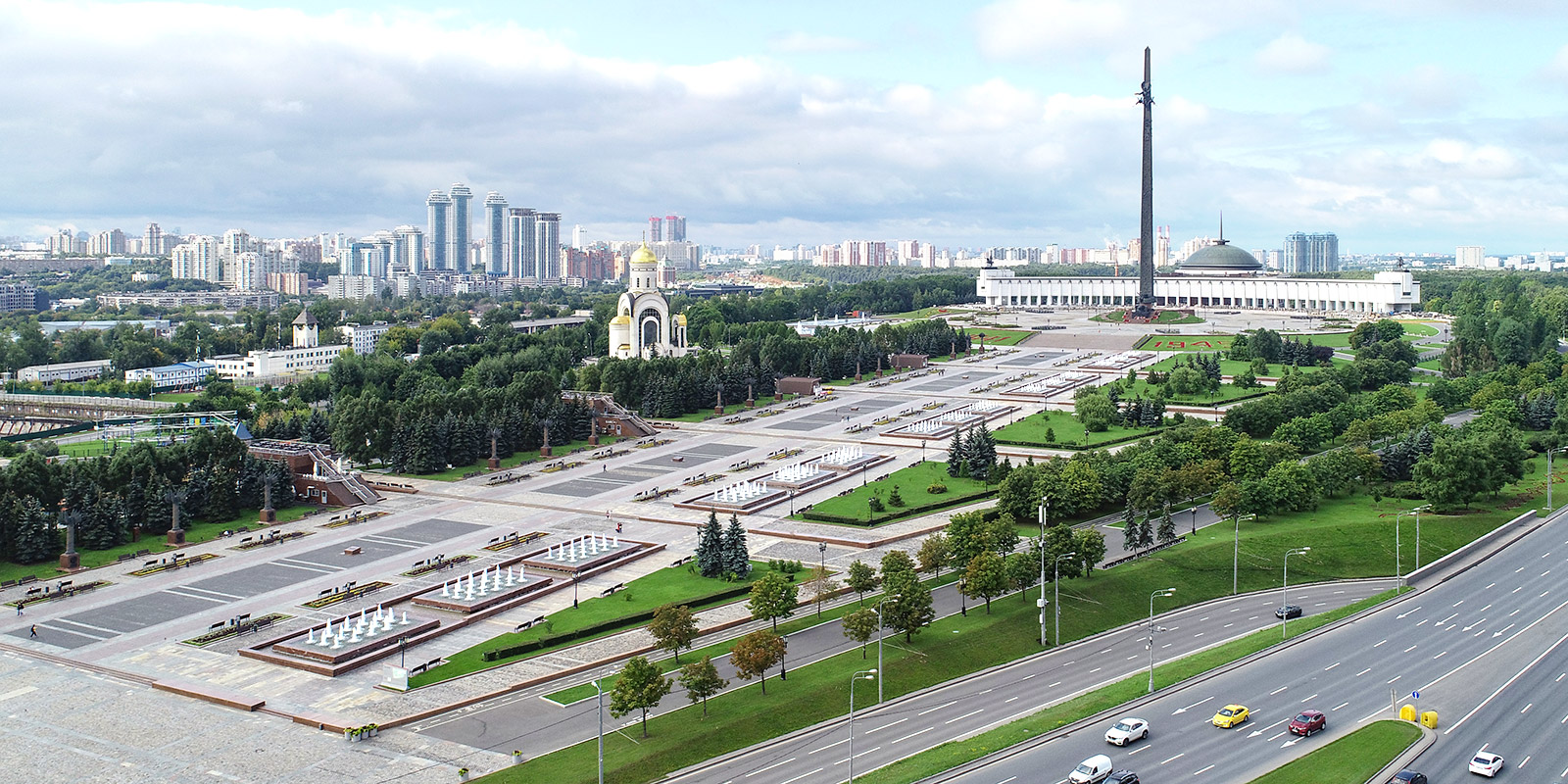
Victory park on Poklonnaya Hill

Poklonnaya Gora (Russian: Покло́нная гора́, literally "Bow-Down Hill"; metaphorically "Worshipful Submission Hill"') is, at 171.5 m, one of the highest natural spots in Moscow. Its two summits were separated by the Setun River until one of the summits was razed in 1987. Since 1936, the area has been part of Moscow, and it now contains the Victory Park, with many tanks and other vehicles that were used during World War II on display.

Historically, the hill had great strategic importance, as it commanded the best view of the capital of Russia. Its name is derived from the Russian for "to bow down" since everyone approaching the capital from the west was expected to do homage here. During the French invasion of Russia in 1812, it was the spot in which Napoleon in vain expected the keys to the Kremlin to be brought to him by Russians.

== Victory Park ==
In the 1960s, the Soviet authorities decided to put the area to use as an open-air museum dedicated to the Russian victory over Napoleon. The New Triumphal Arch, erected in wood in 1814 and in marble in 1827 to a design by Osip Bove, was relocated and reconstructed here in 1968. A loghouse in which Mikhail Kutuzov presided over the Fili Conference, which decided to abandon Moscow, to the enemy, was designated a national monument. The huge panorama "Battle of Borodino" by Franz Roubaud (1910–1912) was installed here in 1962.

The Victory Park and the Square of Victors are important parts of the outdoor museum. In 1987, the hill was levelled to the ground, and in the 1990s an obelisk was added with a statue of Nike, and a monument of Saint George slaying the dragon, both of which were designed by Zurab Tsereteli. The obelisk's height is exactly 141.8 metres (465 ft), which is 10 centimetres (3.9 in) for every day of the war. A golden-domed Orthodox church was erected on the hilltop in 1993-1995, followed by a memorial mosque and the Holocaust Memorial Synagogue.

In 2004 the Monument to Warriors-Internationalists was opened. The Monument was created with the support of the Moscow government, with donations from organizations of veterans of the Afghan war, with personal contributions from internationalist soldiers.

At the 60th V-Day celebrations in 2005, Russia President Vladimir Putin inaugurated 15 extravagant bronze columns, symbolizing the main fronts and navies of the Red Army during World War II.

Structures

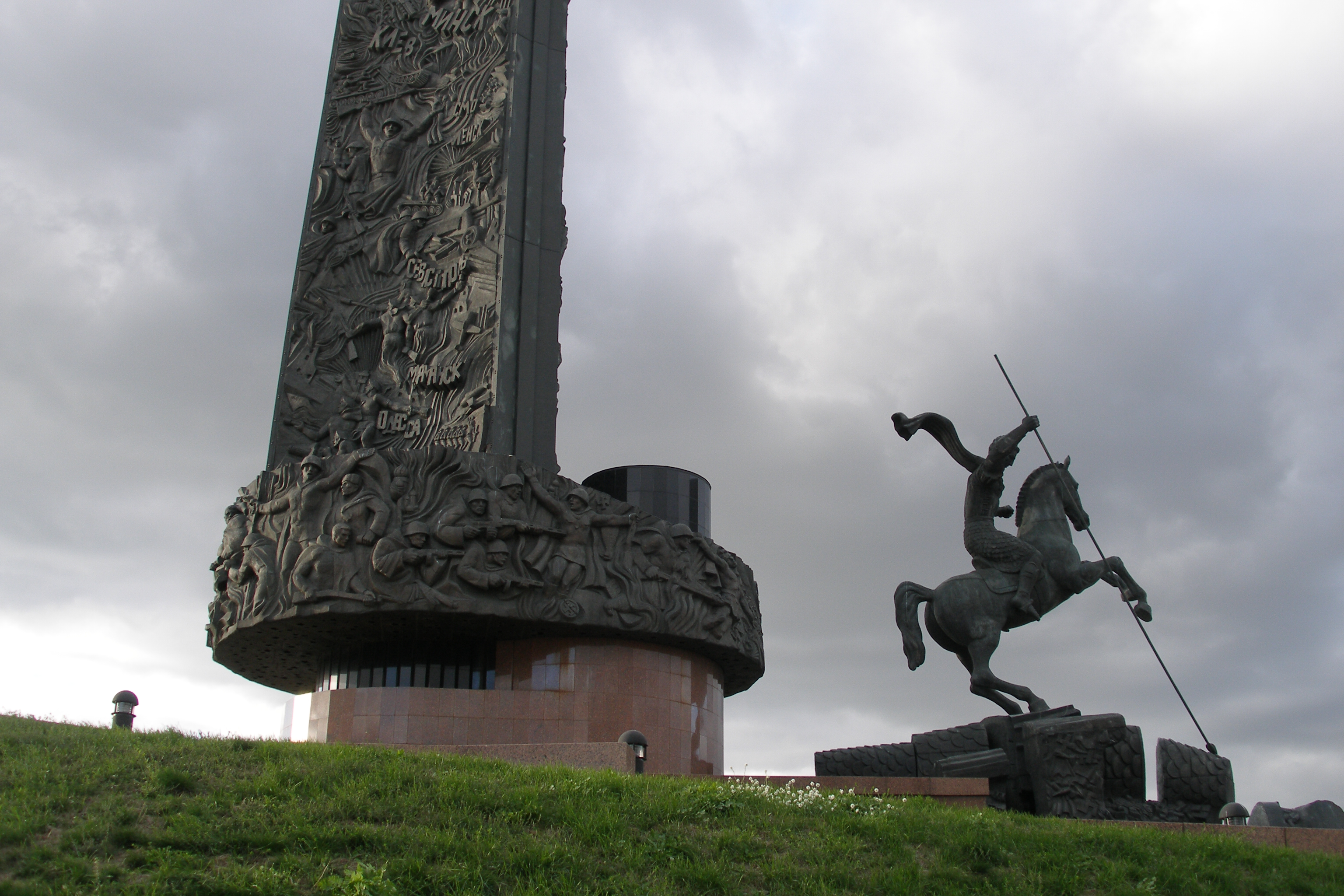
Sculpture of St. George Slaying the Dragon

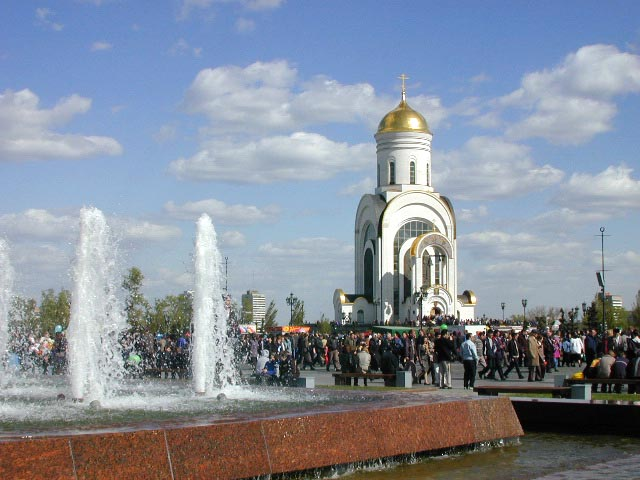
St. George's Church.

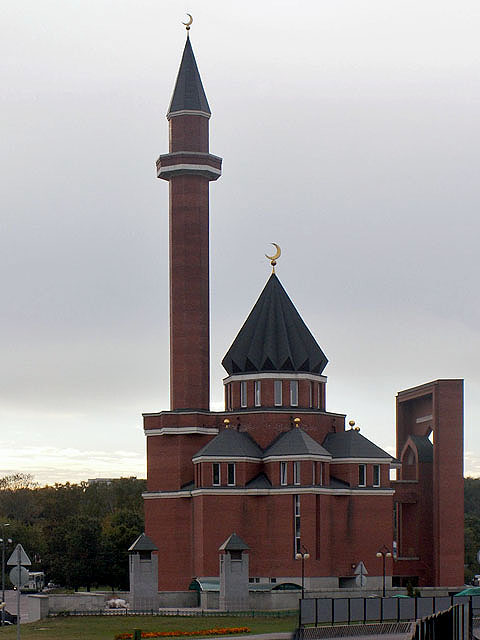
The memorial mosque

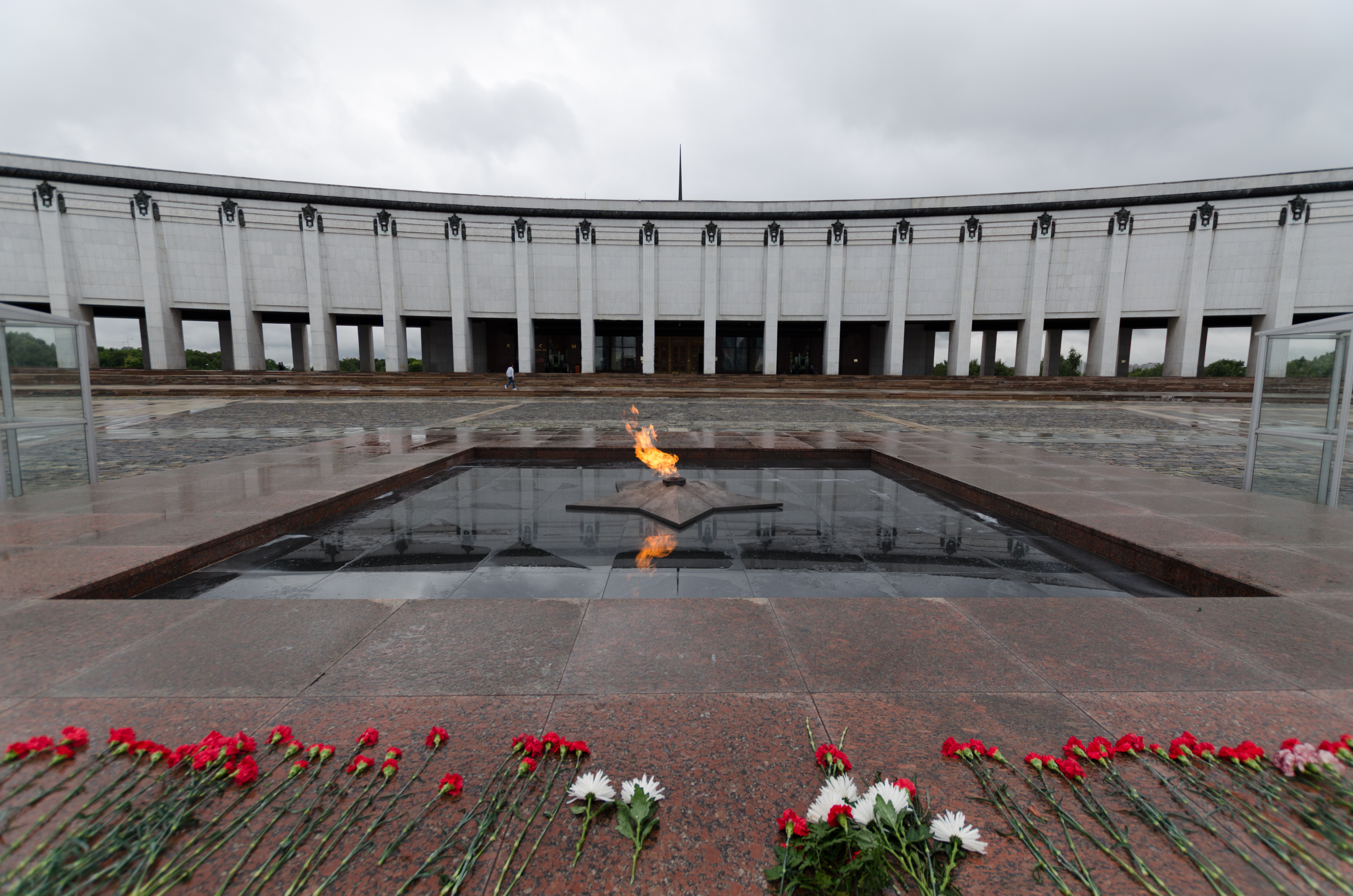
Eternal Flame

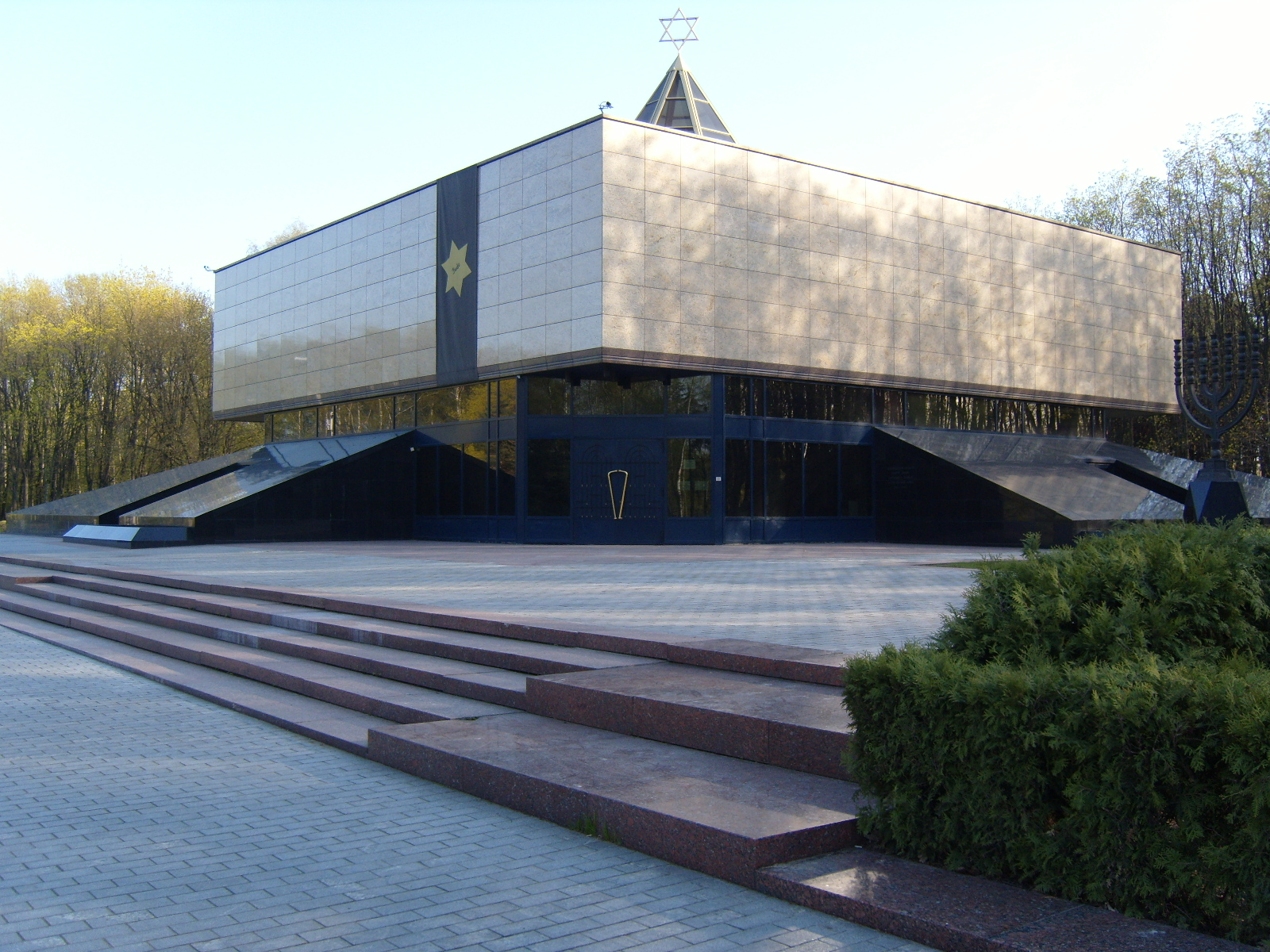
The memorial synagogue

== War museum ==
Since the 1980s, the hill also includes the monumental museum to the Soviet victory during the Great Patriotic War. The main building of the museum was constructed between 1983 and 1995. The Hall of Glory holds reliefs of the 12 Soviet Hero Cities, and on its marble walls are inscribed the names of several thousand persons decorated as Heroes of the Soviet Union for their actions during the war. The Hall of Remembrance downstairs contains books of remembrance with the names of more than 26 million Soviet war dead.

Vehicles

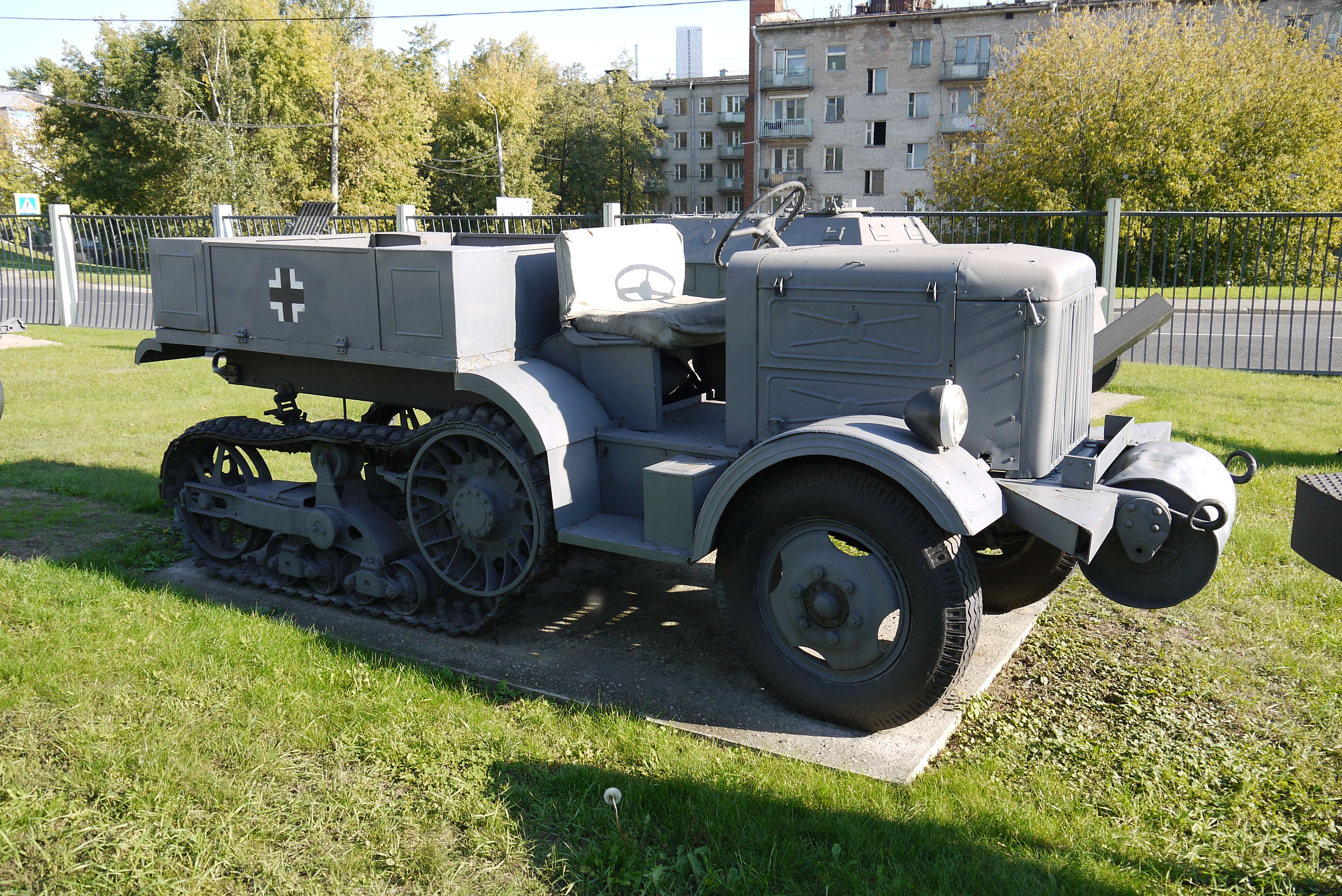
A Unic-Kegresse P107 half-track that was captured and used by the Wehrmacht, displayed in the Museum of the Great Patriotic War, Moscow, Poklonnaya Hill Victory Park

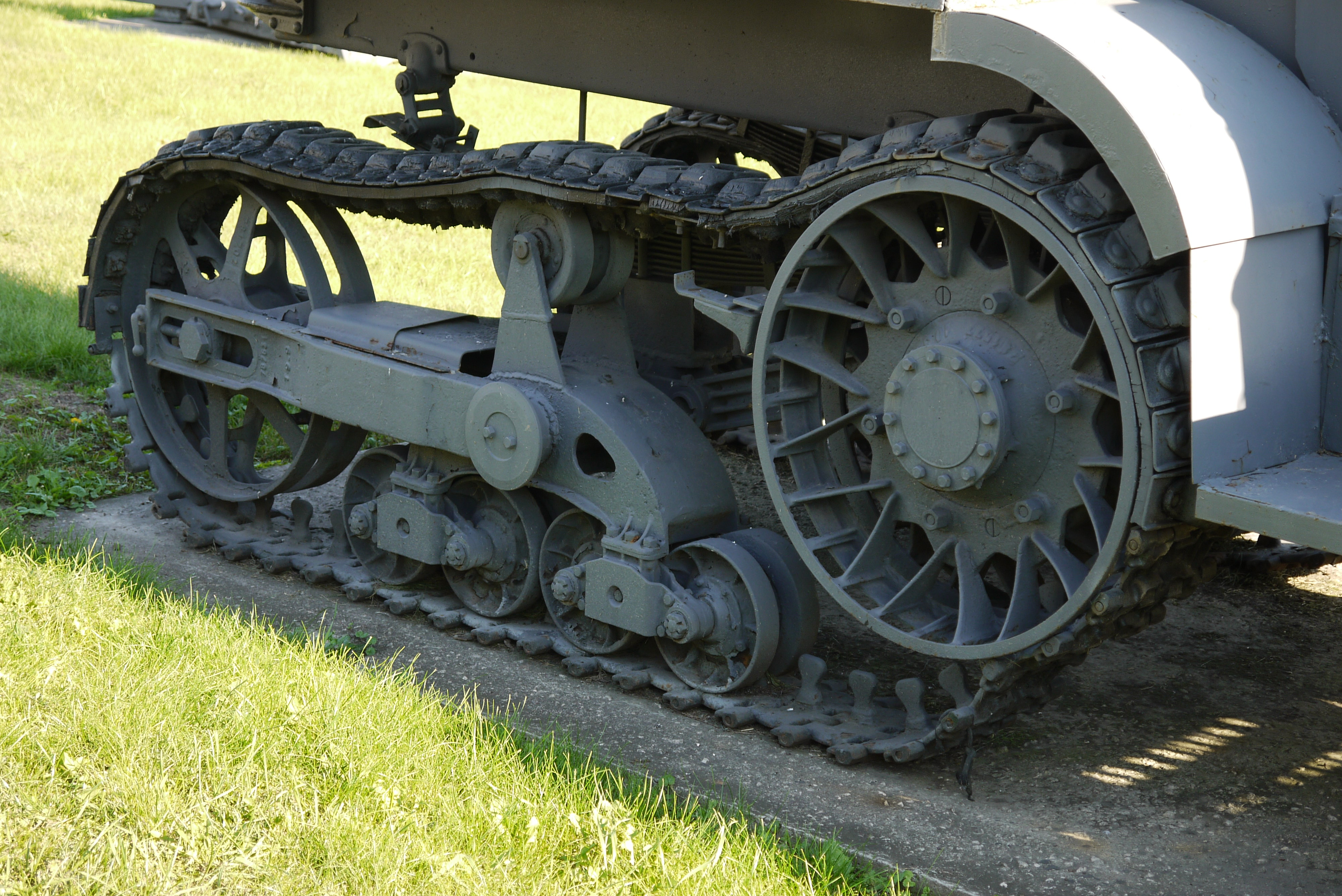
Tracks of a Unic-Kegresse P107 half-track that was captured and used by the Wehrmacht, displayed in the Museum of the Great Patriotic War, Moscow, Poklonnaya Hill Victory Park

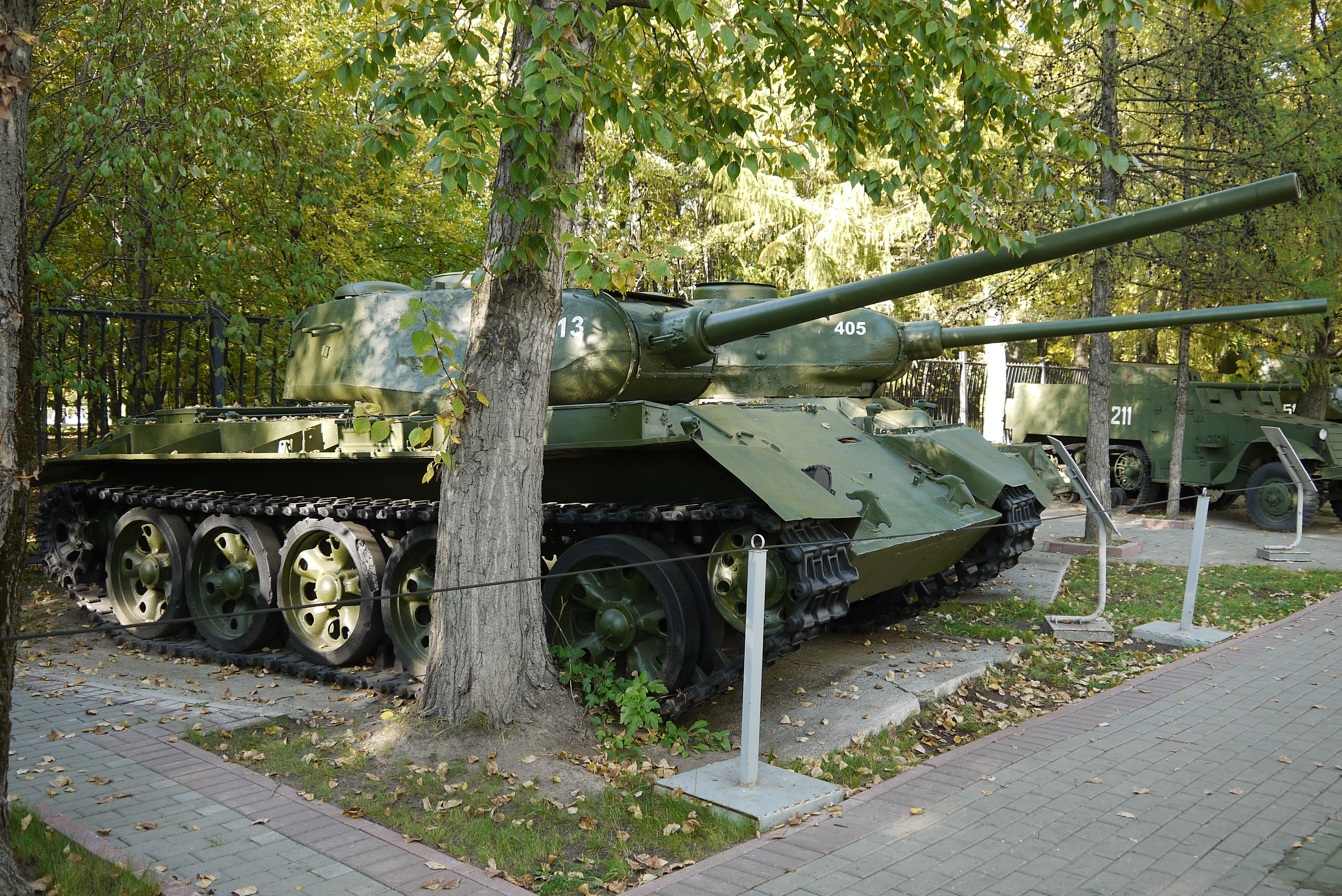
T-44 displayed in the Museum of the Great Patriotic War, Moscow, Poklonnaya Hill Victory Park

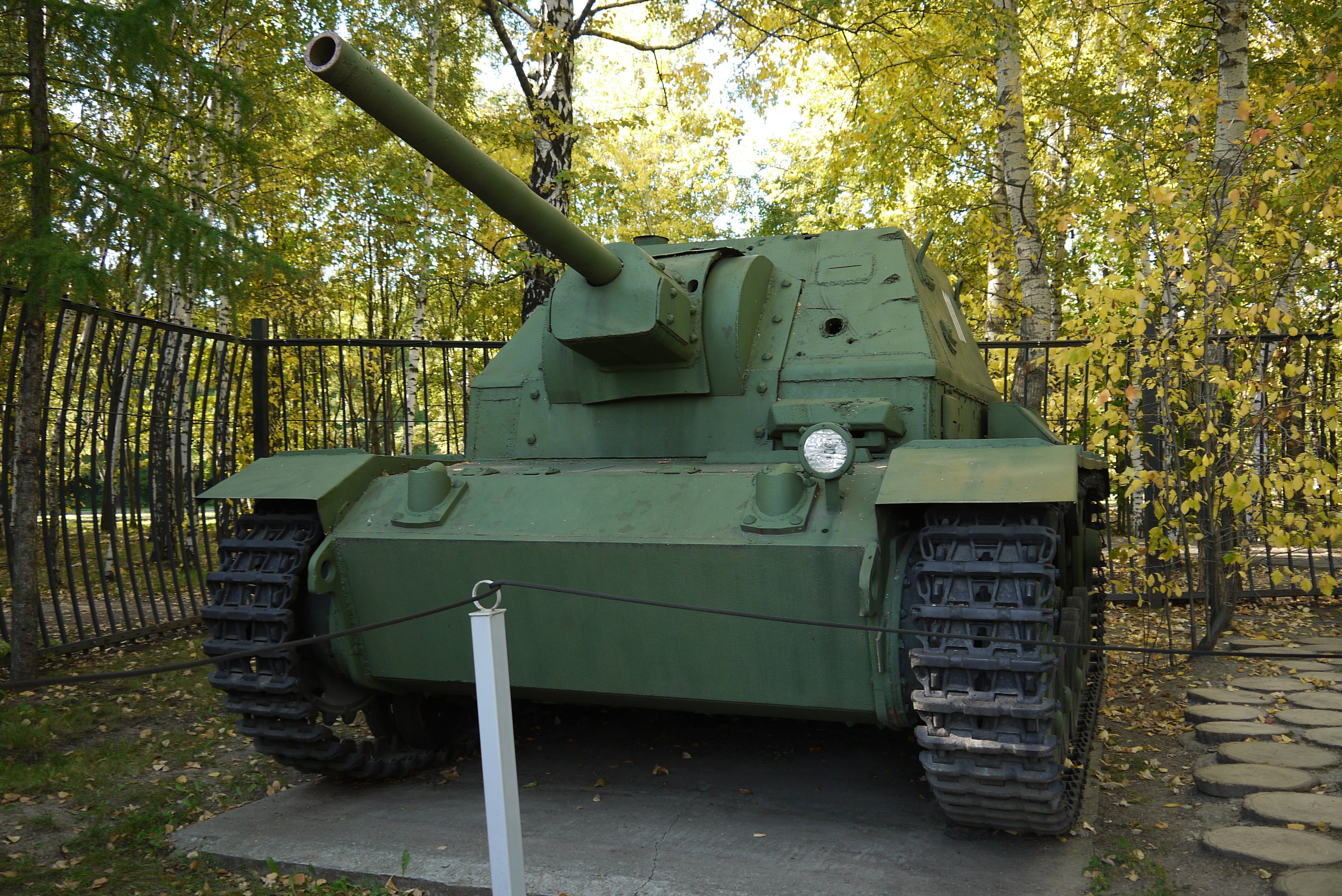
Su-76i displayed in the Museum of the Great Patriotic War, Moscow, Poklonnaya Hill Victory Park

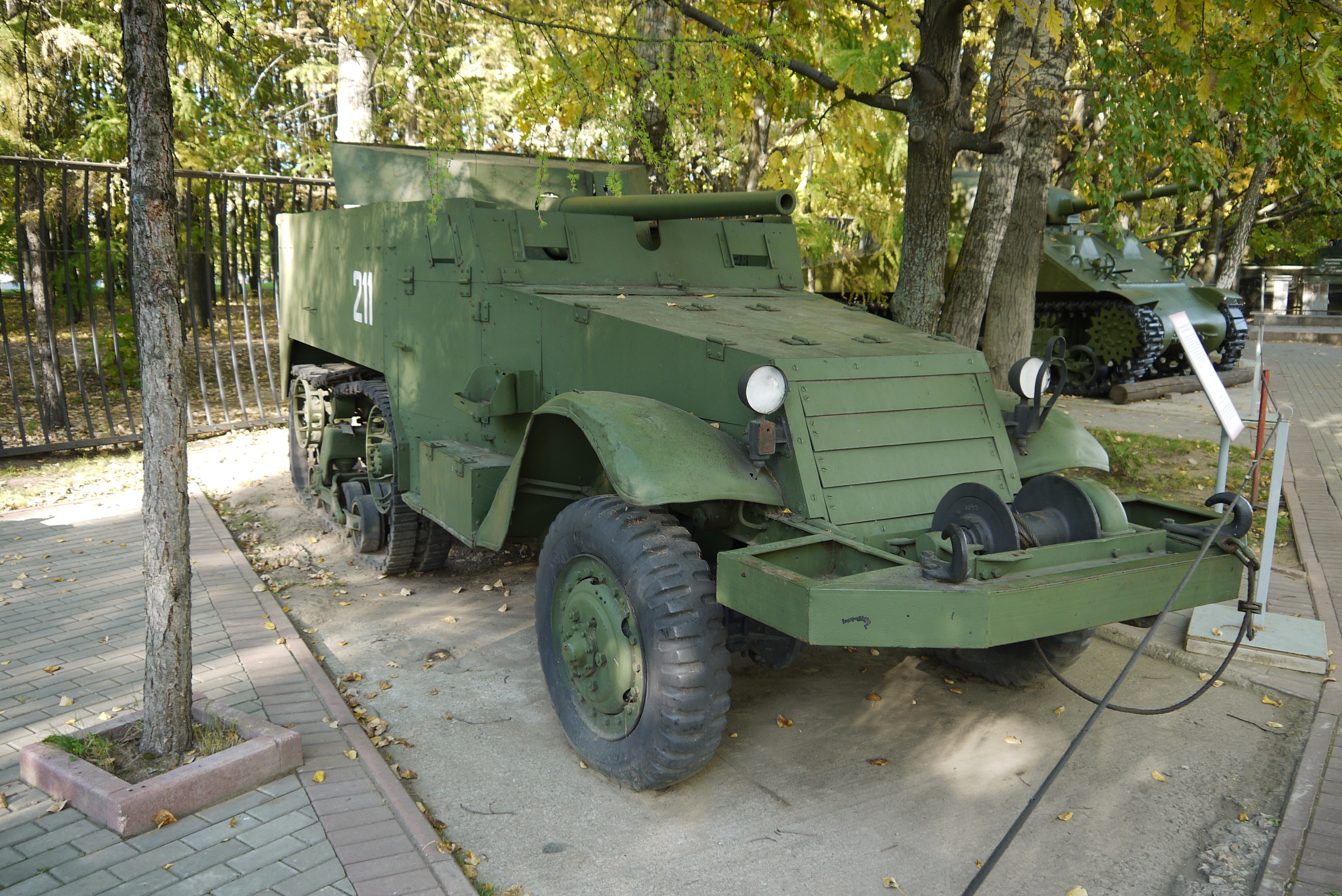
T48 57 mm GMC / SU-57 based on the M3 Half-track in the Museum of the Great Patriotic War, Moscow, Poklonnaya Hill Victory Park
