= Weinheim (disambiguation) =

Weinheim is a town in Baden-Württemberg, Germany.

Weinheim may also refer to:

- Weinheim (Bergstraße) Hauptbahnhof, a railway station in Weinheim
- Weinheim (electoral district), an electoral constituency represented in the Landtag of Baden-Württemberg
- Weinheim, a district of Alzey, Rhineland-Palatinate, Germany
- 183182 Weinheim, a minor planet

== See also ==
- Gau-Weinheim, an Ortsgemeinde (collective municipality) in Rhineland-Palatinate, Germany
- Weinheimer, a surname
