= National board of the CDU =

Governing body of the Christian Democratic Union of Germany

- CDU-Bundesvorstand
- Parent organisation: Christian Democratic Union of Germany
- Website: Struktur der CDU

The National Board of the CDU (German: CDU-Bundesvorstand, also translated as its Federal Board) is the highest permanent governing body of the Christian Democratic Union of Germany. The Board meets at least 6 times a year. The daily affairs of the party are the responsibility of the Presidium of the CDU.

The Board consists of the Leader of the CDU, the Secretary General, the Five Deputy Leaders, the treasurer, the honorary chairs, seven elected members of the presidium and 26 elected board members. If the position is held by a CDU member, the Board also consists of the Chancellor of Germany, the President or Vice President of the Bundestag, the chair of the CDU/CSU faction, the President of the European Parliament and the chair of the European People's Party.

== Current members ==
The CDU Minister Presidents of the federal states attend the meetings of the Presidium in an advisory capacity. In practice, the same applies to the Federal Managing Director, who, according to the statutes, only participates in the Executive Committee in an advisory capacity.

=== Presidium of the CDU ===
since the election at the 36th Party Diet in 2024, the Presidium of the CDU's current members are:

Members of the Presidium of the CDU
Member	Party Office(s)
Ex officio members
Friedrich Merz	Leader of the CDU; Leader of the CDU/CSU group in the Bundestag
Franziska Hoppermann	General Secretary of the CDU; Chairman of the CDU's Program and Principles Commission
Silvia Breher	Deputy Leader of the CDU; Leader of the Oldenburg CDU
Andreas Jung	Deputy Leader of the CDU
Michael Kretschmer	Deputy Leader of the CDU; Leader of the CDU Saxony
Karl-Josef Laumann	Deputy Leader of the CDU; Chairman of the Christian Democratic Employees' Association
Karin Prien	Deputy Leader of the CDU; Chairwoman of the Jewish Forum in the CDU
Julia Klöckner	Federal Treasurer of the CDU
Christina Stumpp	Deputy General Secretary of the CDU
Elected members of the Presidium
Ines Claus	Leader of the CDU group in the Landtag of Hesse
Ronja Kemmer	
Sebastian Fechner	Leader of the CDU in Lower Saxony; Leader of the CDU group in the Landtag of Lower Saxony
Ina Scharrenbach	
Sven Schulze	Leader of the CDU Saxony-Anhalt
Jens Spahn	Deputy Leader of the CDU/CSU group in the Bundestag
Mario Voigt	State Chairman of the CDU Thuringia; Leader of the CDU group in the Landtag of Thuringia
Members by virtue of legislative office
Yvonne Magwas	Vice President of the German Bundestag
Daniel Caspary	Leader of the CDU/CSU group in the European Parliament
Advisory Members
Daniel Günther	
Reiner Haseloff	
Boris Rhein	
Kai Wegner	
Hendrik Wüst	
Philip Birdkenmaier	Federal Director of the CDU Germany

=== Federal Party Board ===
In addition to the members of the Presidium who also sit on the Federal Board, the other non-advisory members of the Federal Board include:

Members of the Federal Board of the CDU
Member	Party Office(s)
Membership Representative
Friedrich Merz	General Secretary of the CDU Mecklenburg-Vorpommern
Elected members of the Federal Board
Ruth Baumann	
Steffen Bilger	Deputy Leader of the CDU/CSU group in the Bundestag
Joe Chialo	
Birte Glißmann	Whip of the CDU group in the Landtag of Schleswig-Holstein
Hermann Gröhe	Deputy Leader of the CDU/CSU group in the Bundestag
Serap Güler	
Elke Hannack	
Stefan Heck	
Mechthild Heil	
Carina Hermann	
Franziska Hoppermann	
Thomas Jarzombek	
Thomas Kufen	
Alexander Lorz	
Henning Otte	
Jan Redmann	Leader of the CDU Brandenburg; Leader of the CDU group in the Landtag of Brandenburg
Bastian Schneider	
Marc Speicher	Membership representative of the CDU Saar
Kim-Sarah Speer	
Jessica Steiner	
Johannes Steiniger	
Johannes Volkmann	Chairman of the Lahn-Dill CDU district association
Astrid Wallmann	
Wiebke Winter	Deputy Leader of the CDU group in the Municipal Assembly of Bremen; Deputy Chairwoman of KlimaUnion
Monica Wüllner	Deputy State Chairwoman of the Christian Democratic Employees' Association (CDA); Member of the CDA Federal Board
Paul Ziemiak	General Secretary of the North Rhine-Westphalia

== Historical party office holders ==
=== General Secretaries of the CDU ===
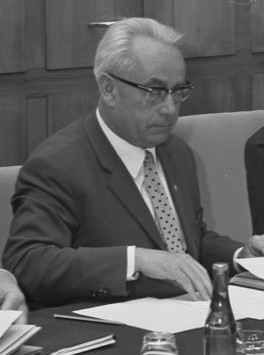
Bruno Heck 1967–1971

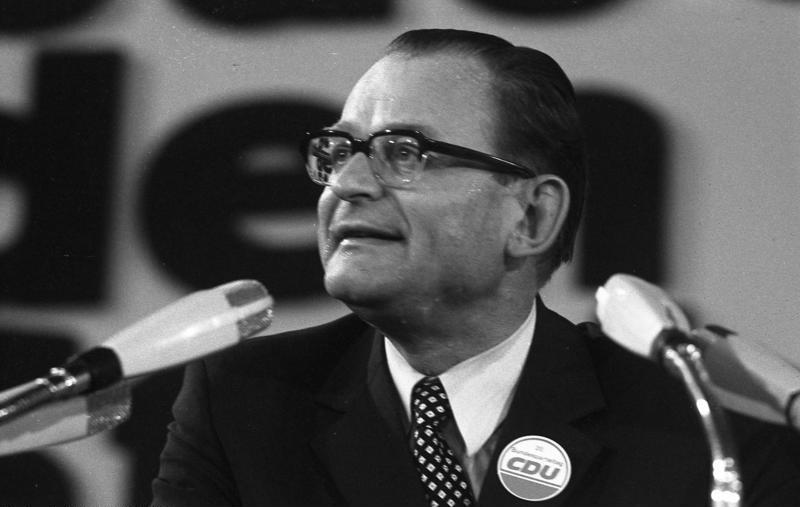
Konrad Kraske 1971–1973

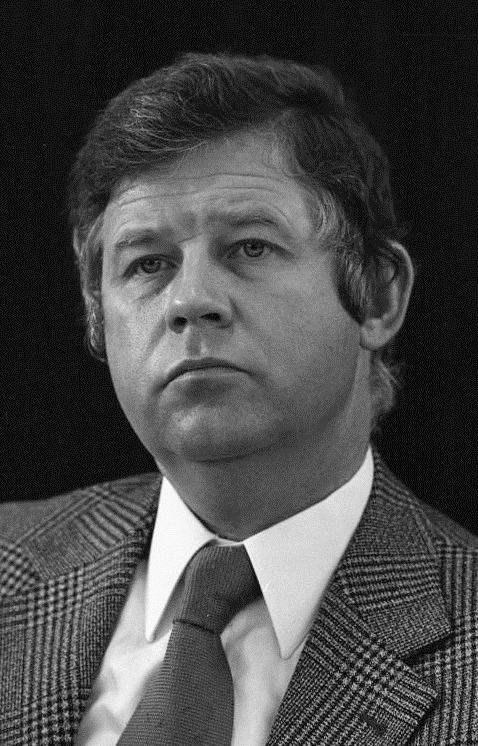
Kurt Biedenkopf 1973–1977

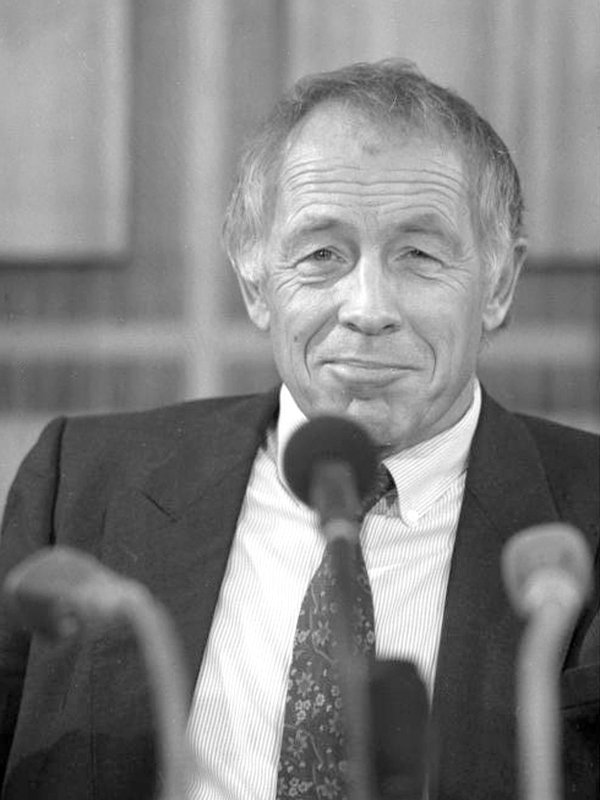
Heiner Geißler 1977–1989

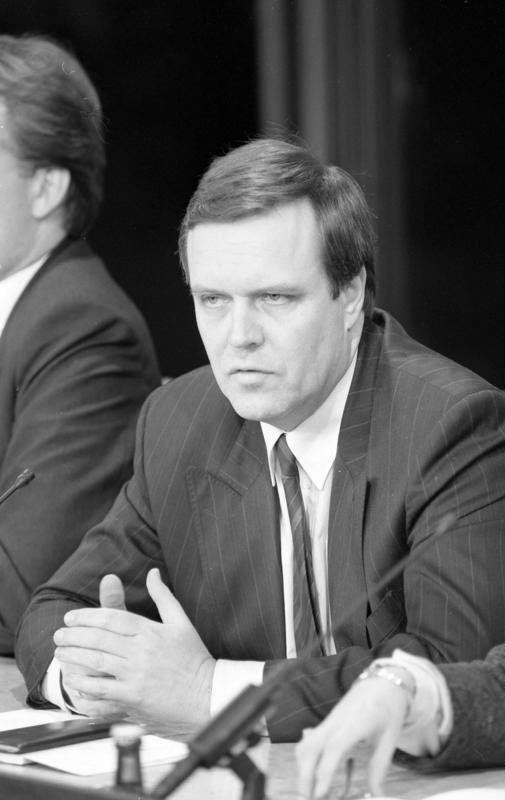
Volker Rühe 1989–1992

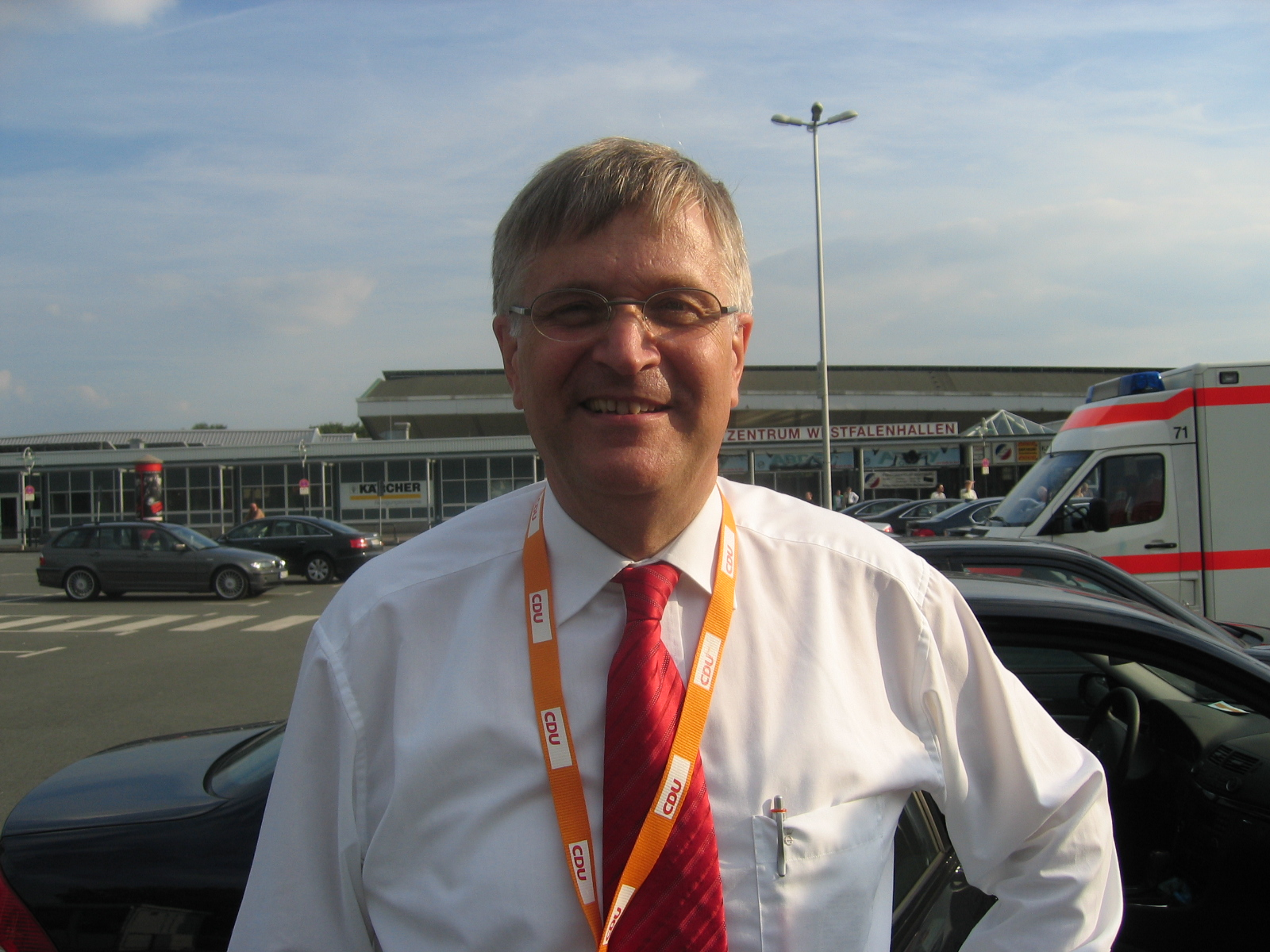
Peter Hintze 1992–1998

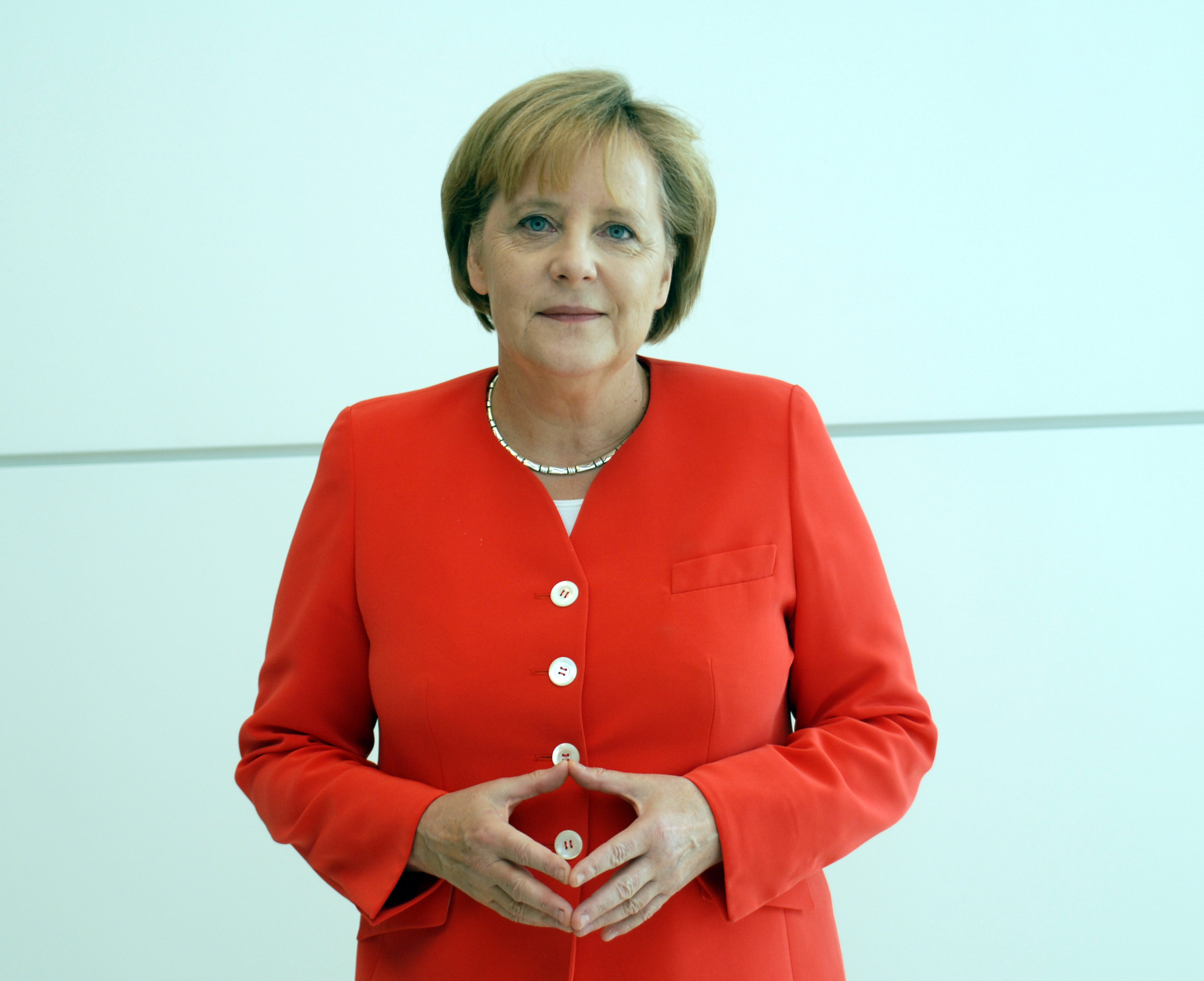
Angela Merkel 1998–2000

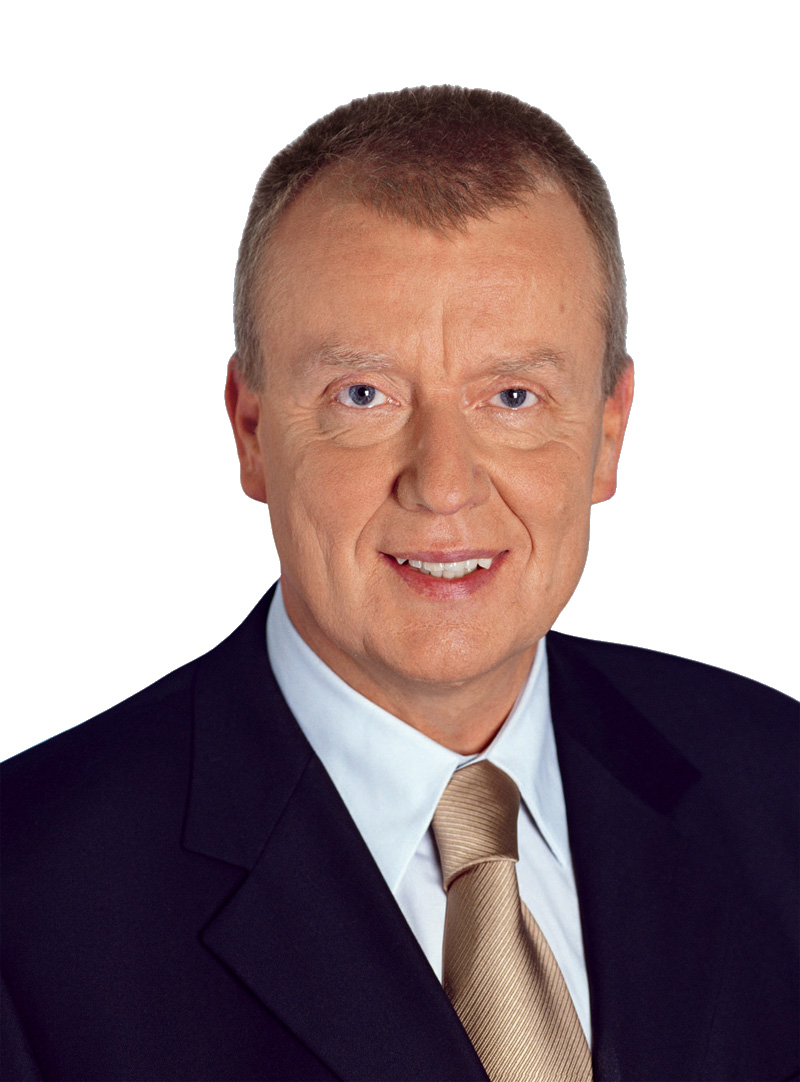
Ruprecht Polenz 2000

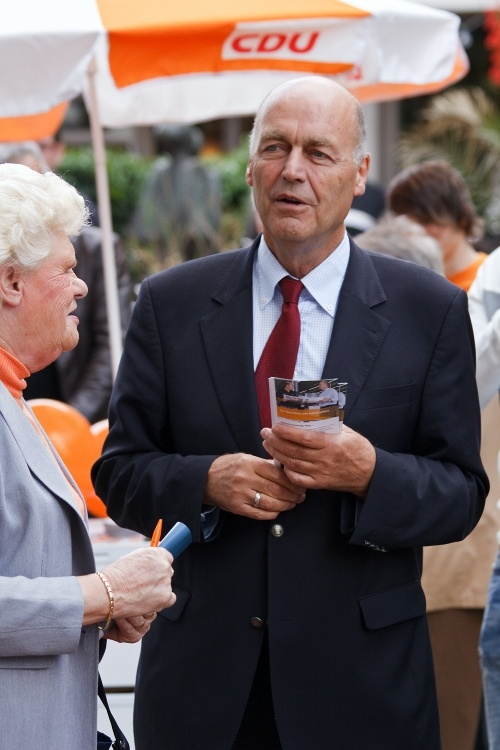
Laurenz Meyer 2000–2004

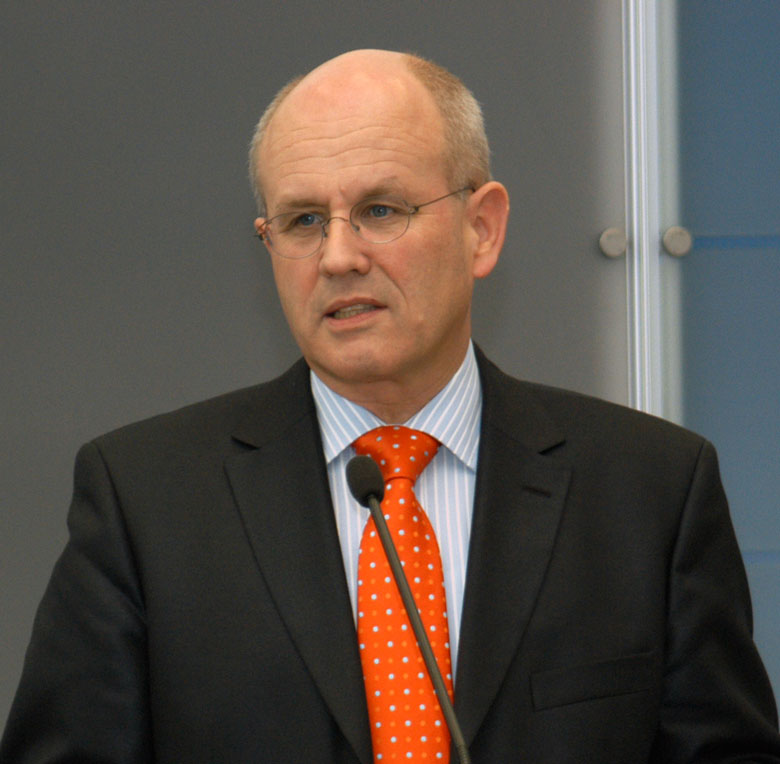
Volker Kauder 2005

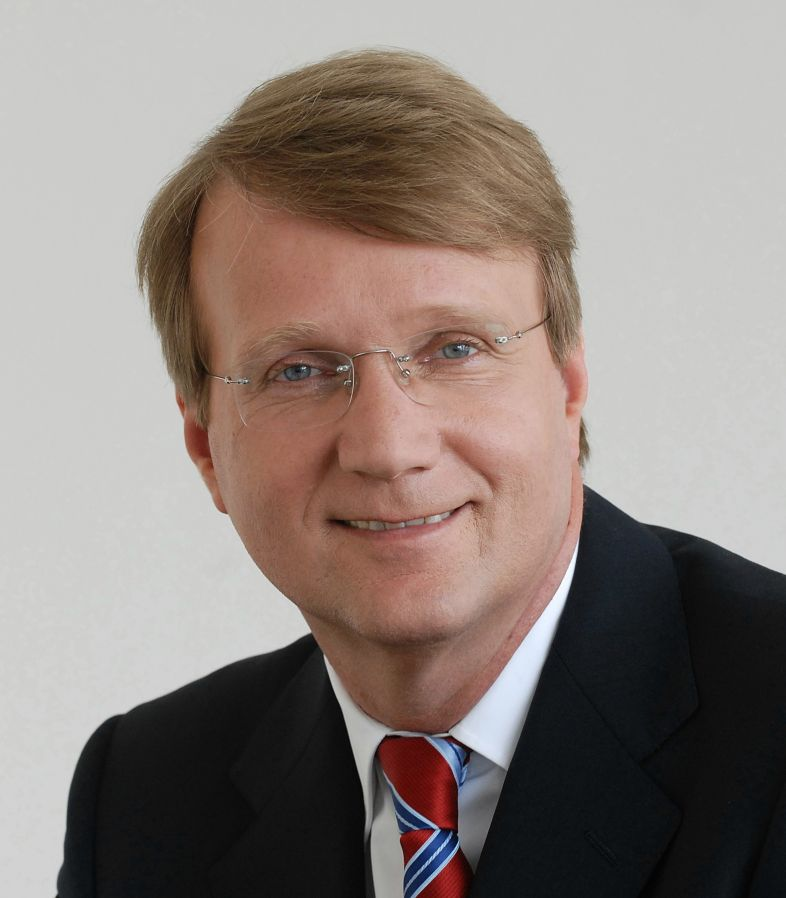
Ronald Pofalla 2005–2009

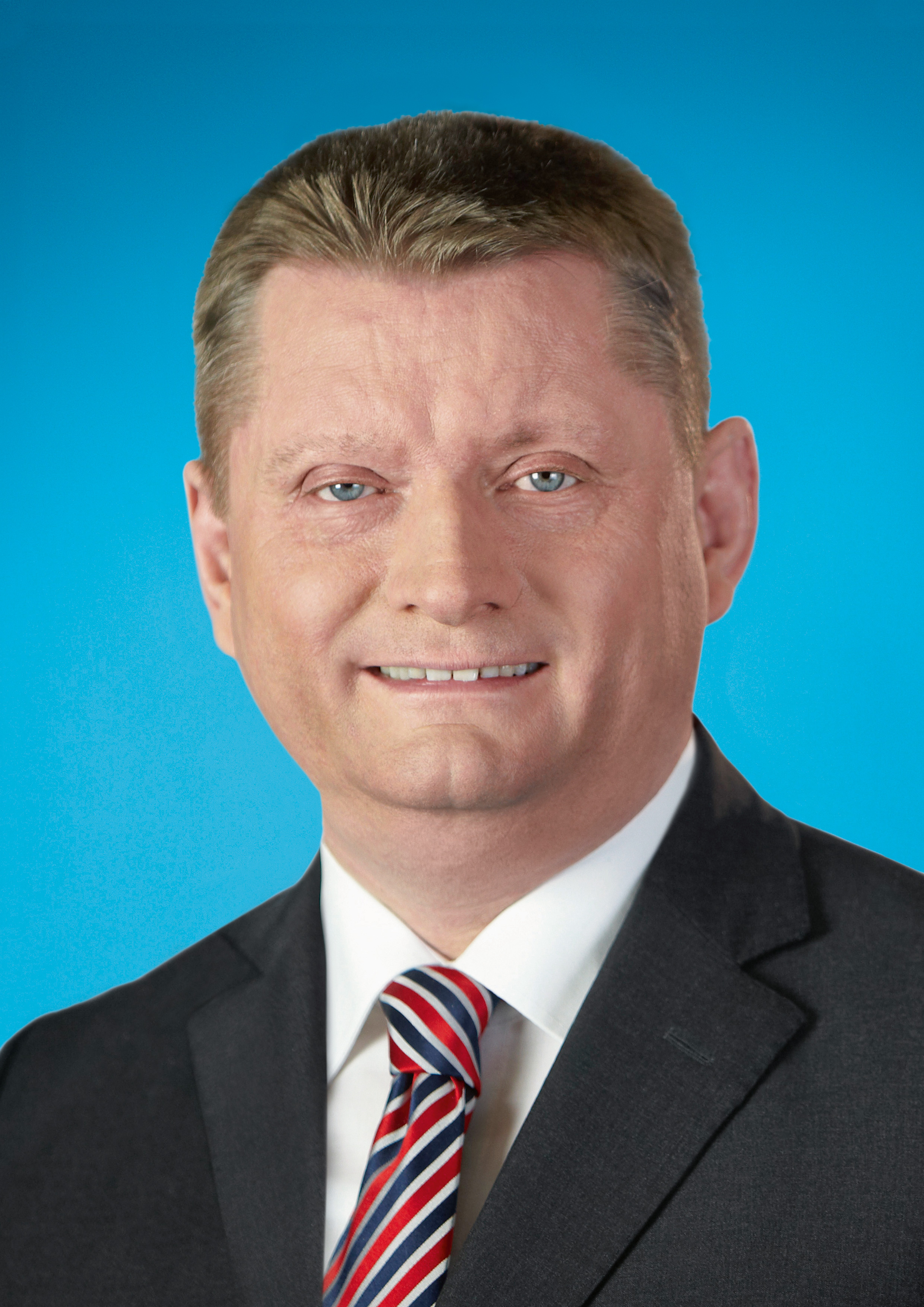
Hermann Gröhe 2009–2013

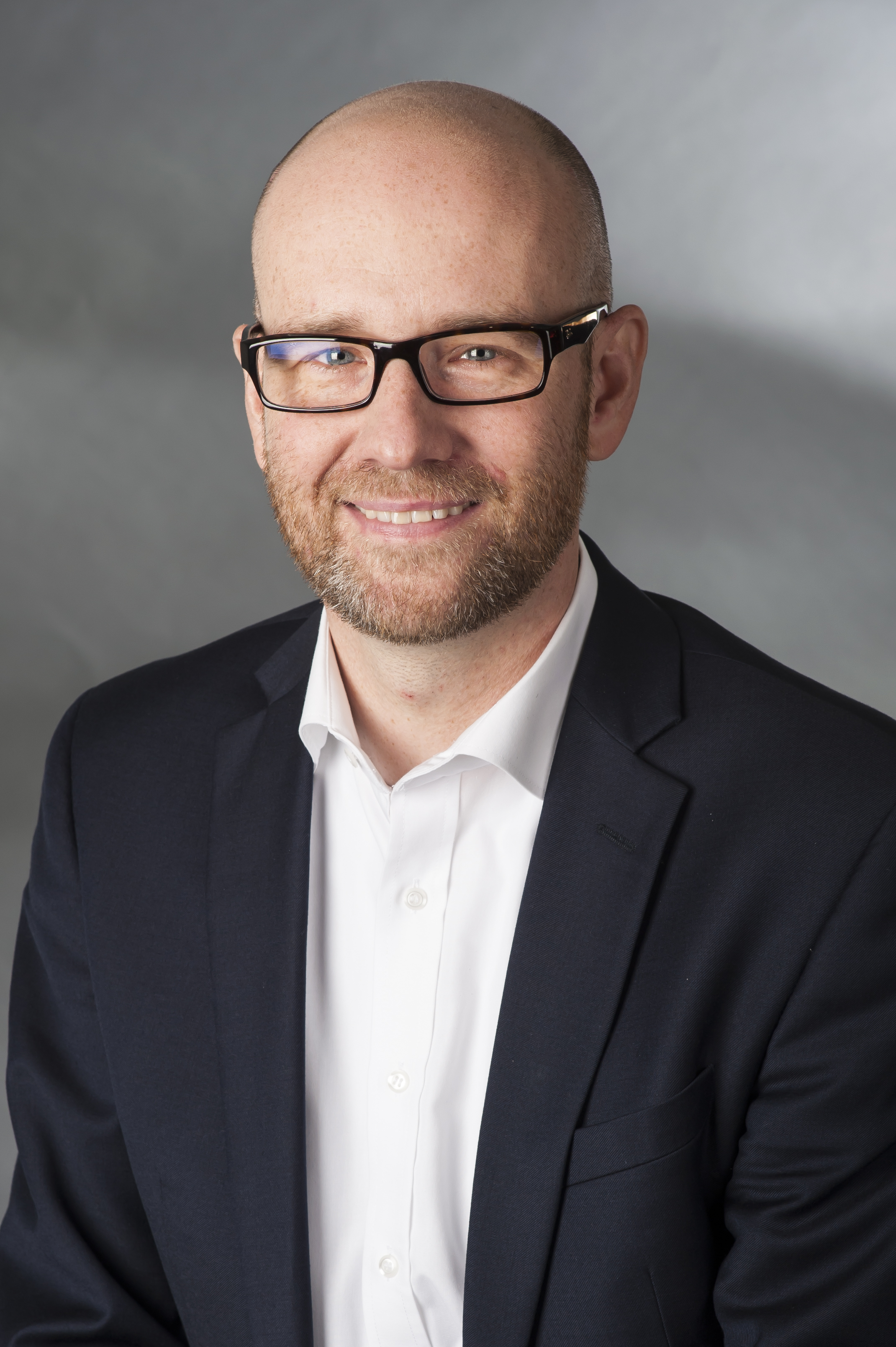
Peter Tauber 2013–2018

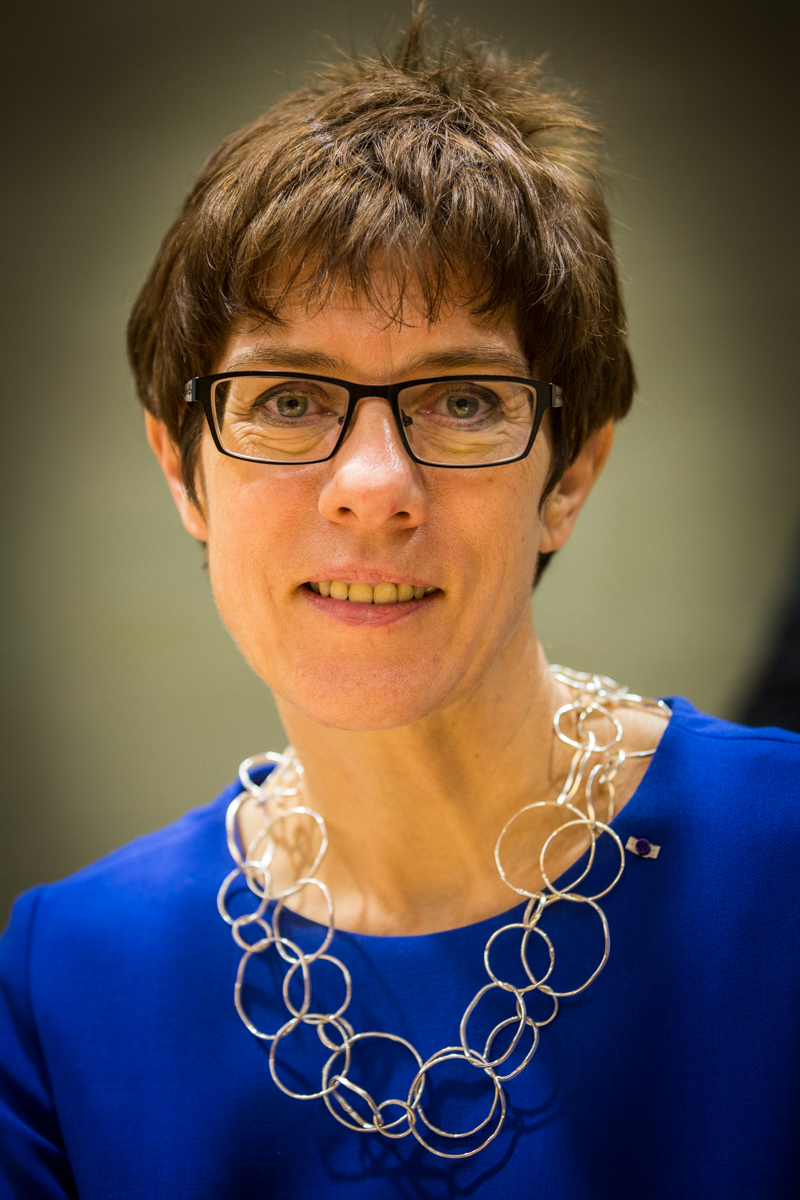
Annegret Kramp-Karrenbauer 2018

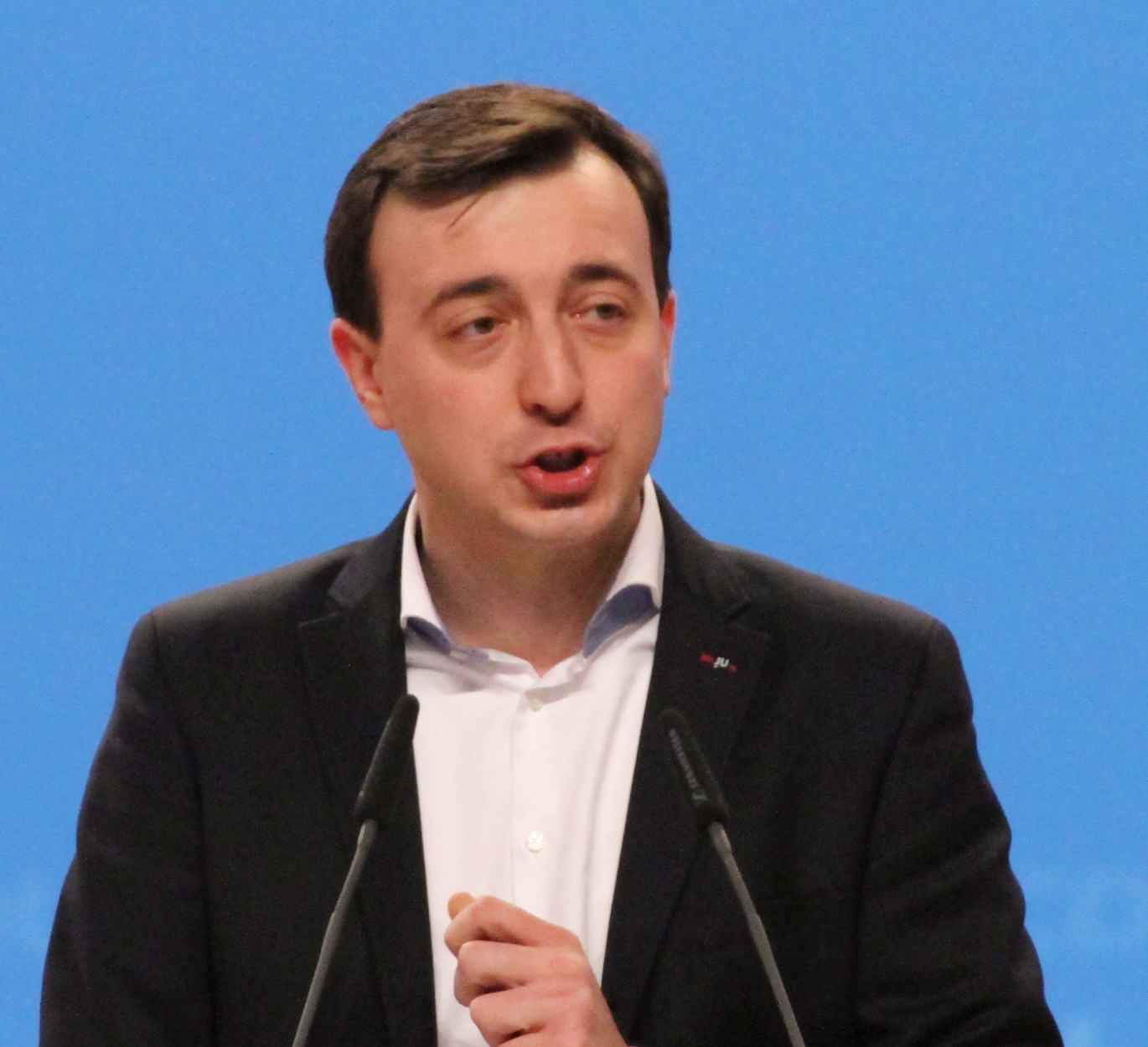
Paul Ziemiak 2018–2022

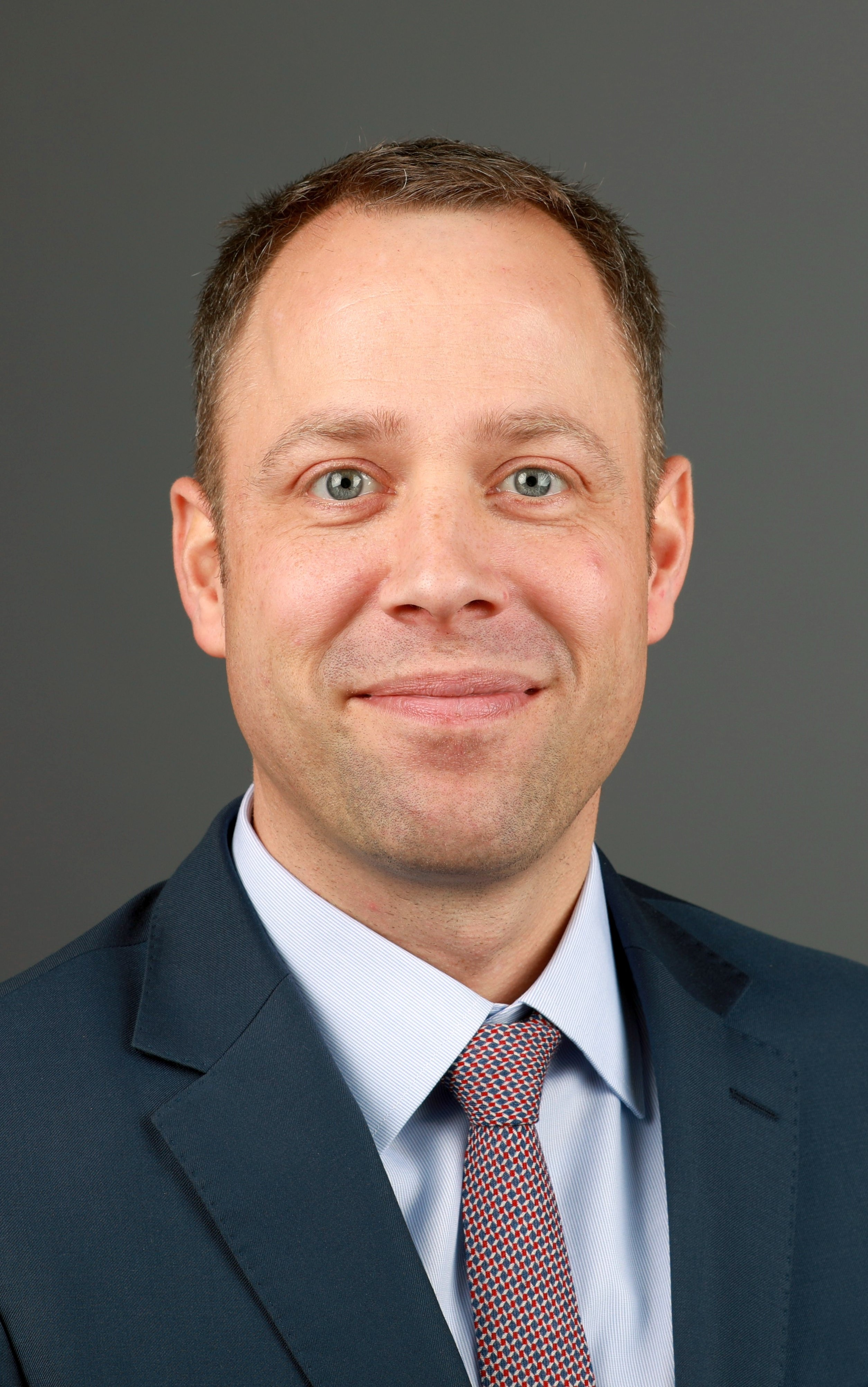
Mario Czaja 2022–2023

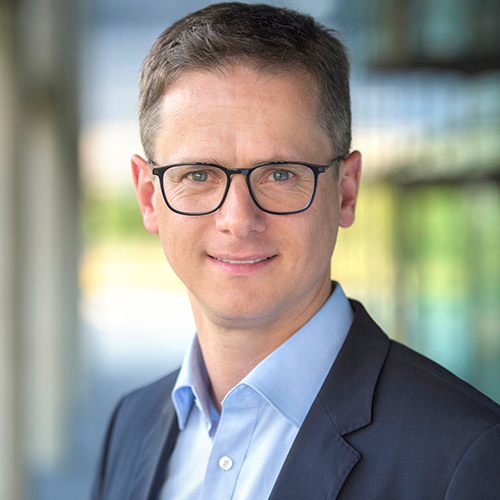
Carsten Linnemann, 2023-July 2026, elected May 2024

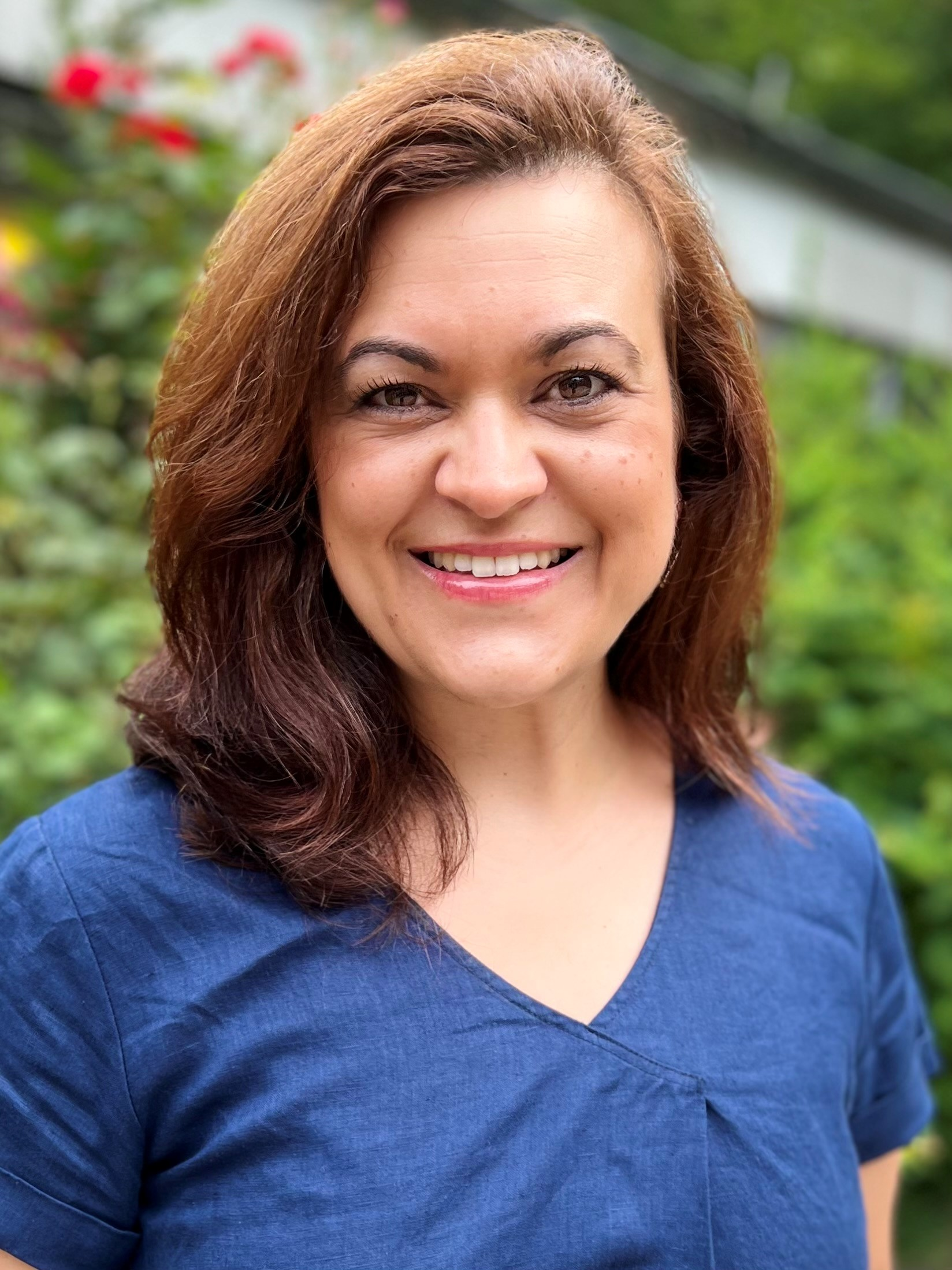
Franziska Hoppermann (acting)

=== Deputy Federal leader since 1990 ===
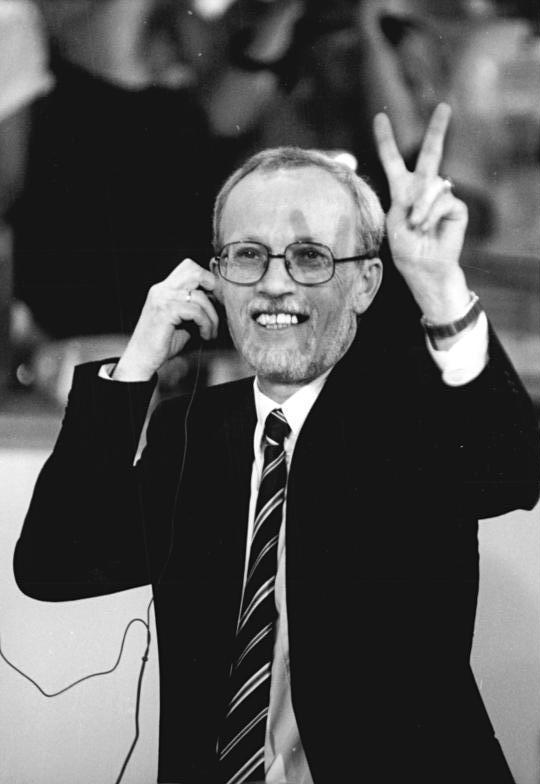
Lothar de Maizière 1990–1992

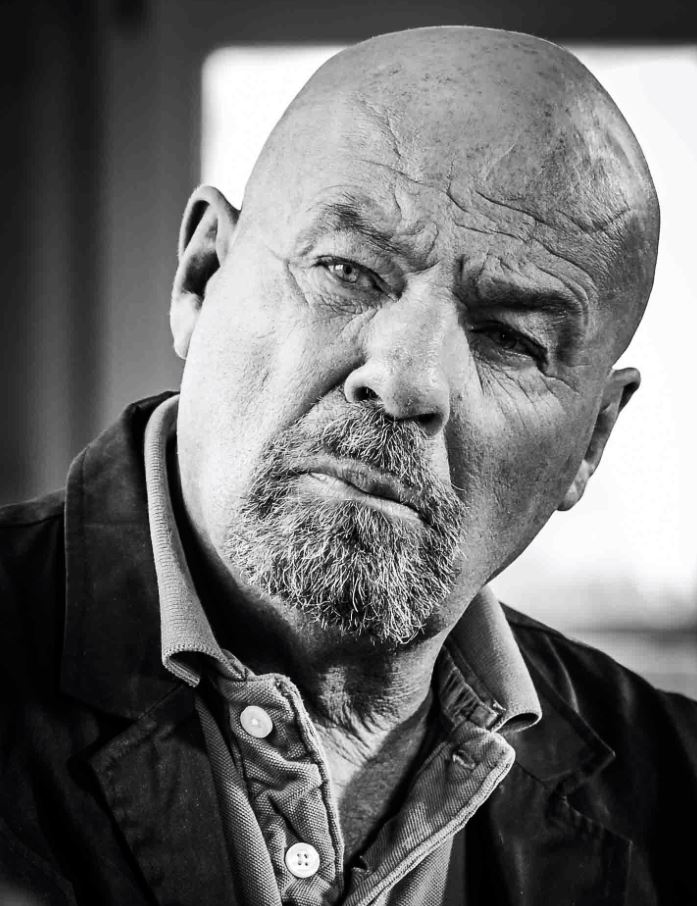
Heinz Eggert 1992–1996

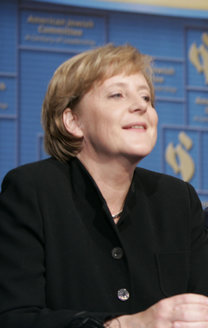
Angela Merkel 1992–1998

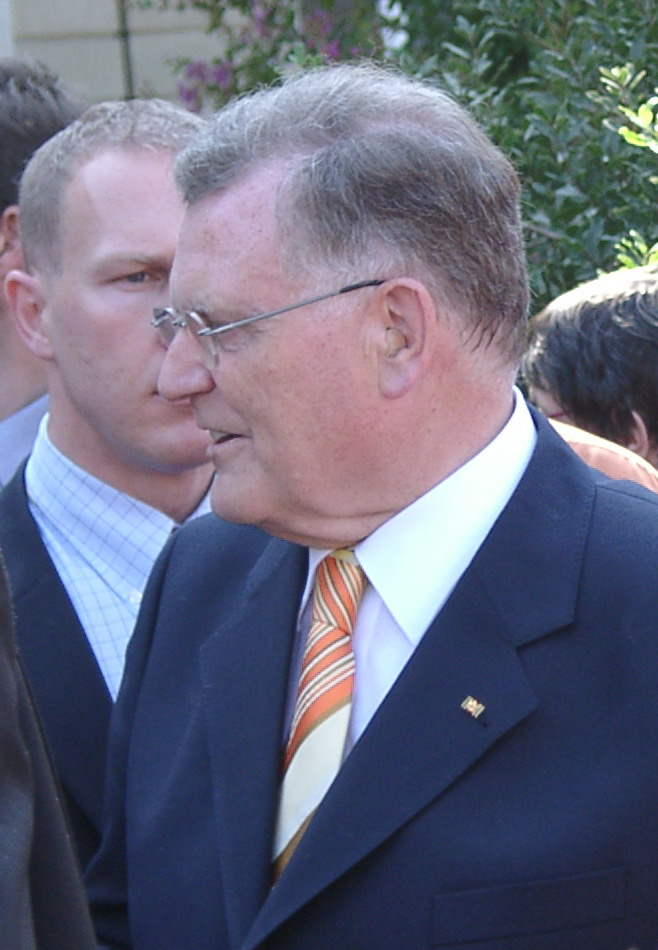
Erwin Teufel 1992–1998

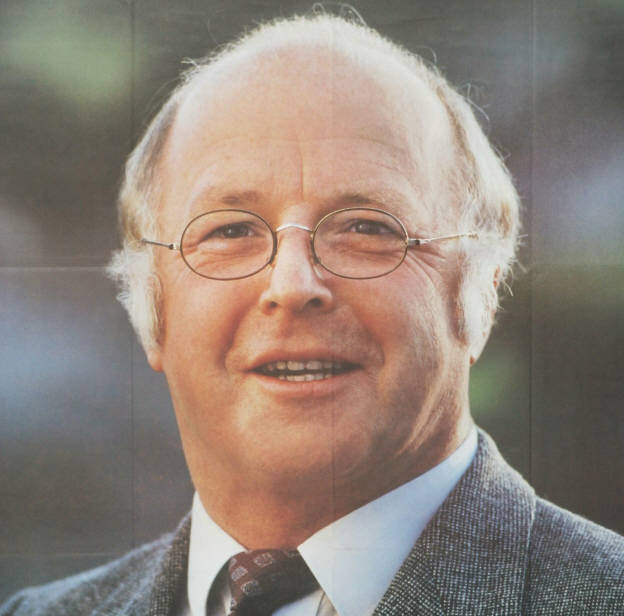
Norbert Blüm 1992–2000

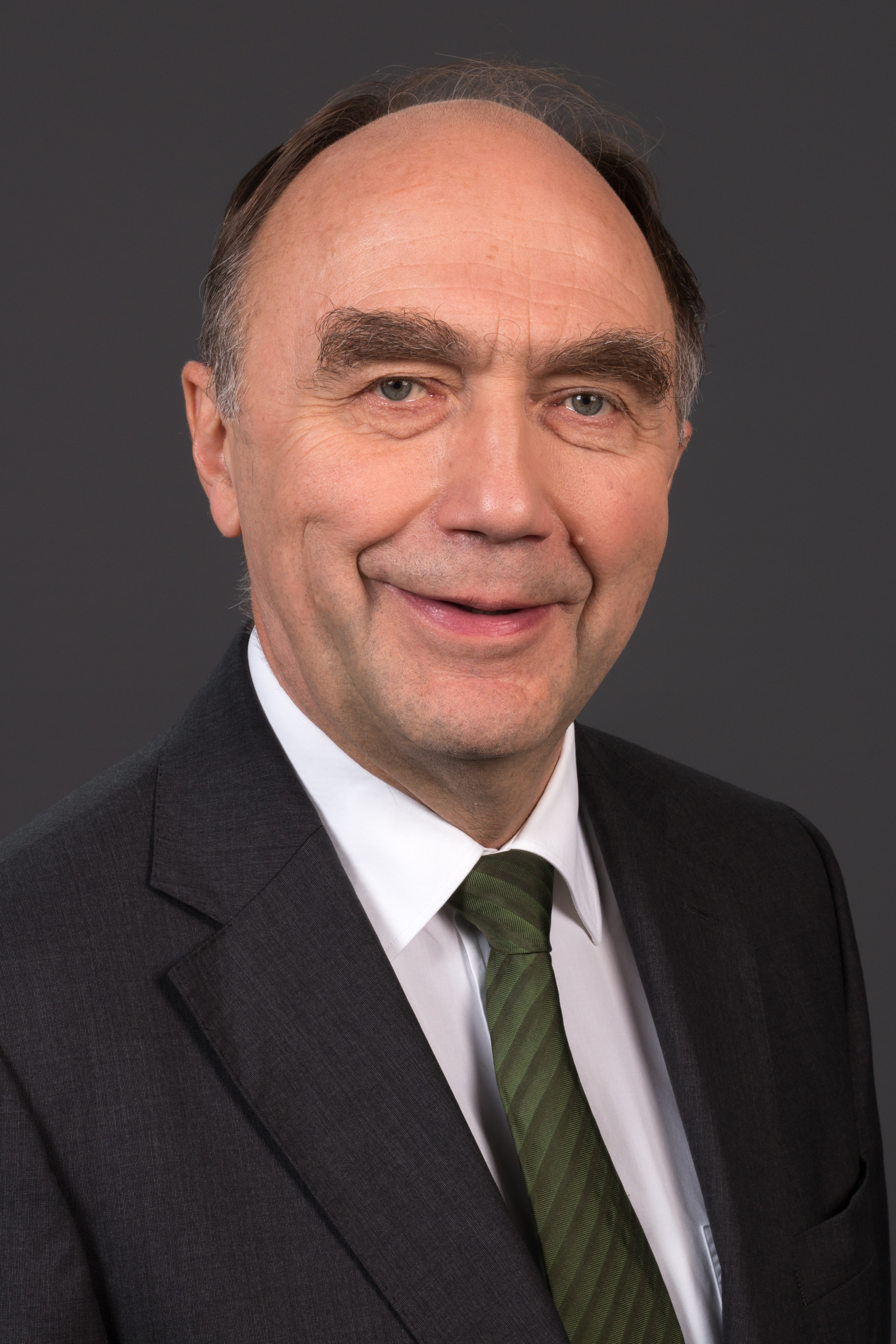
Christoph Bergner 1996–1998

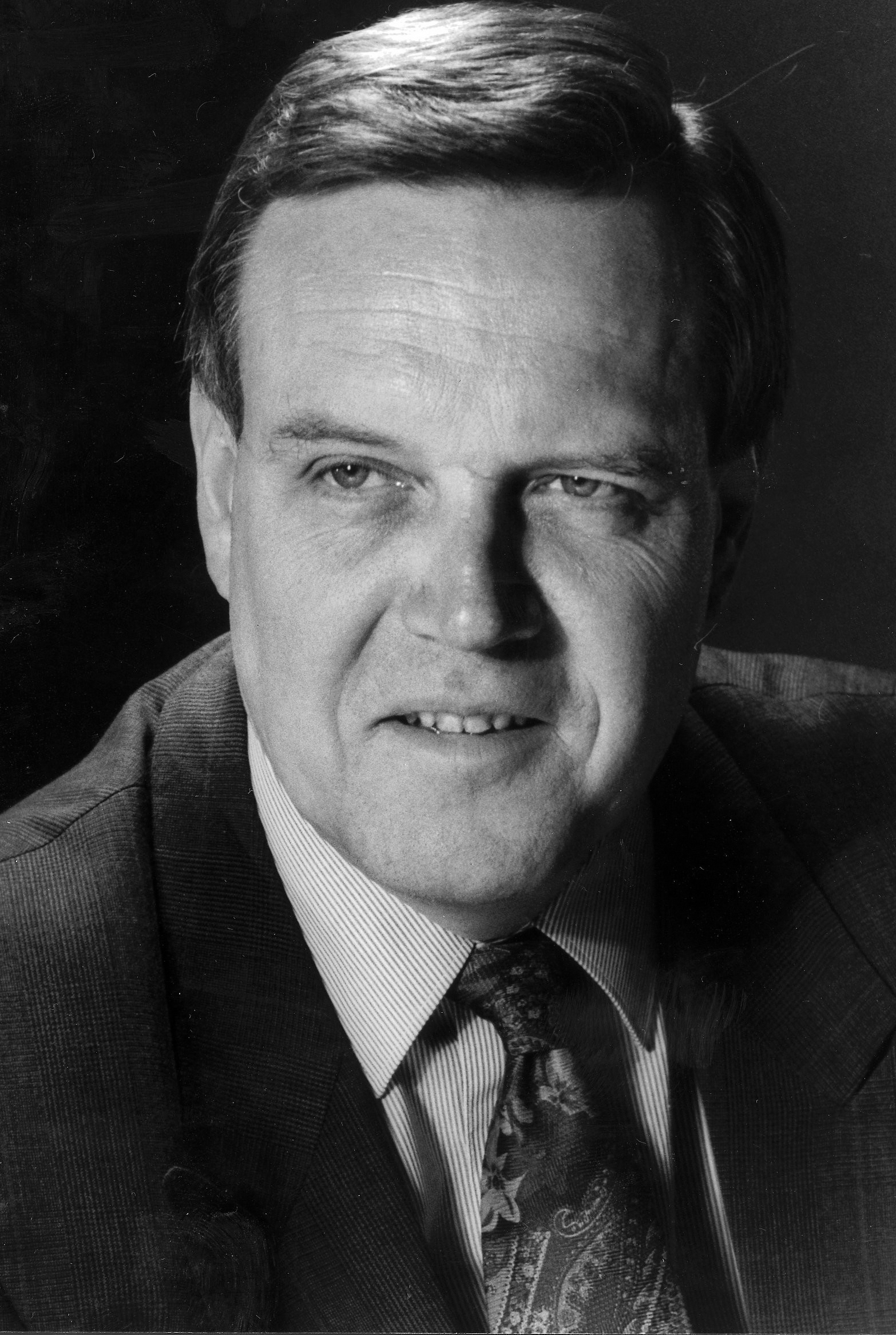
Volker Rühe 1998–2002

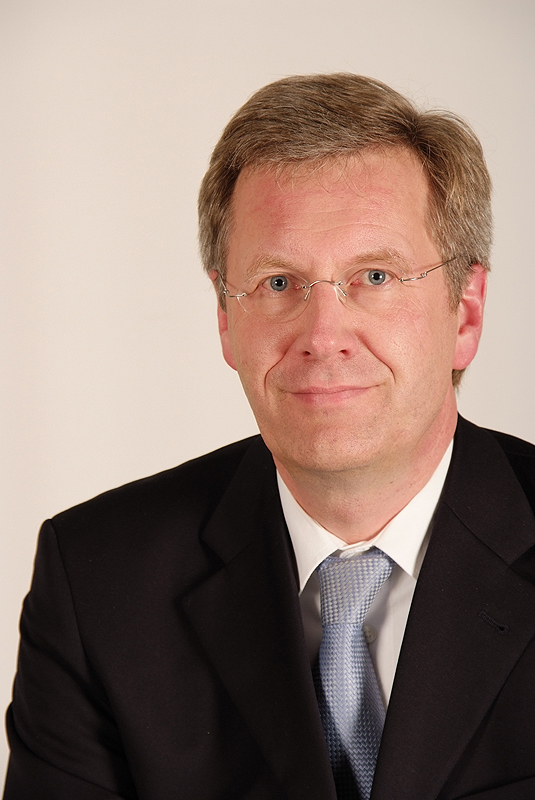
Christian Wulff 1998–2010

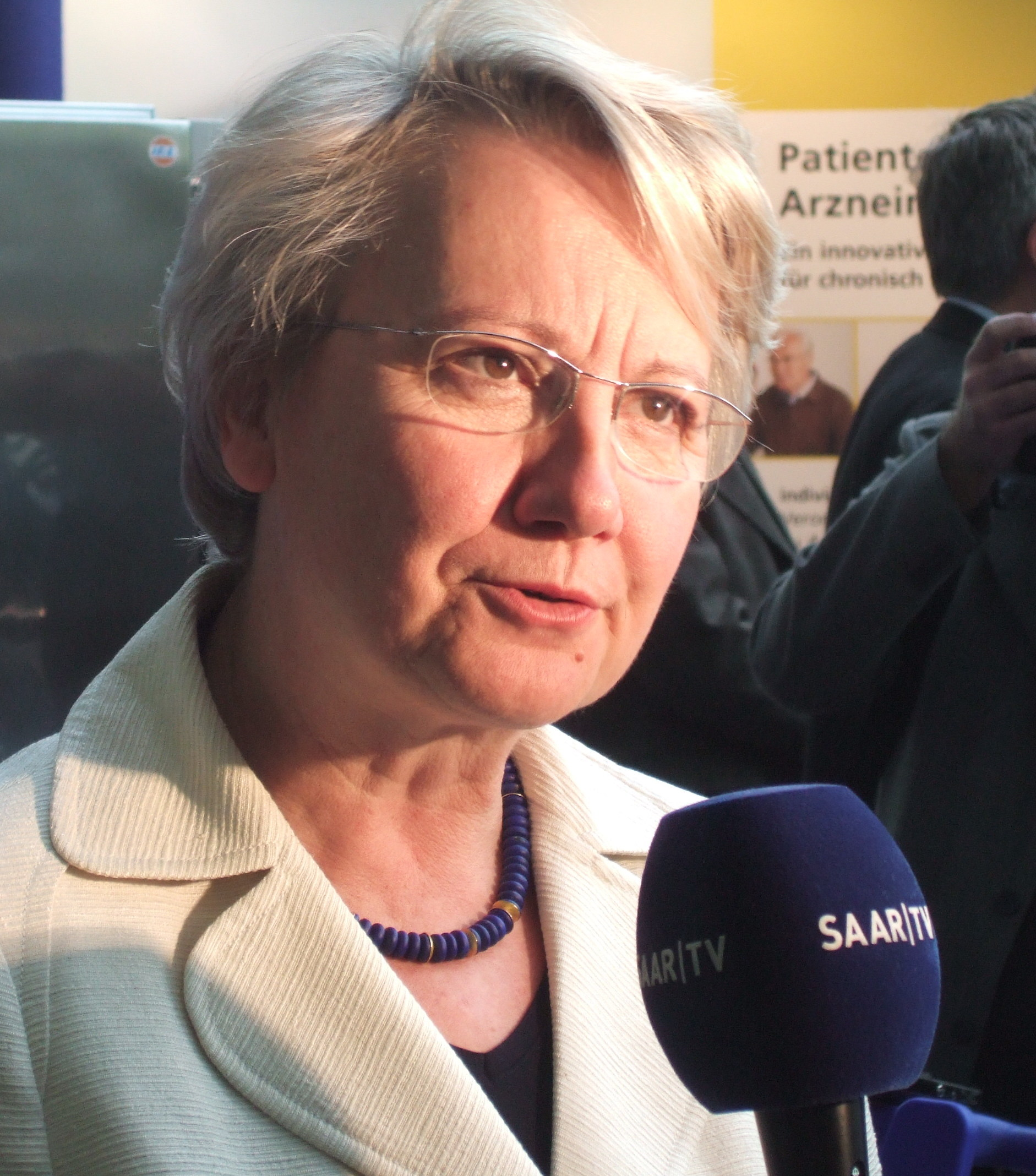
Annette Schavan 1998–2012

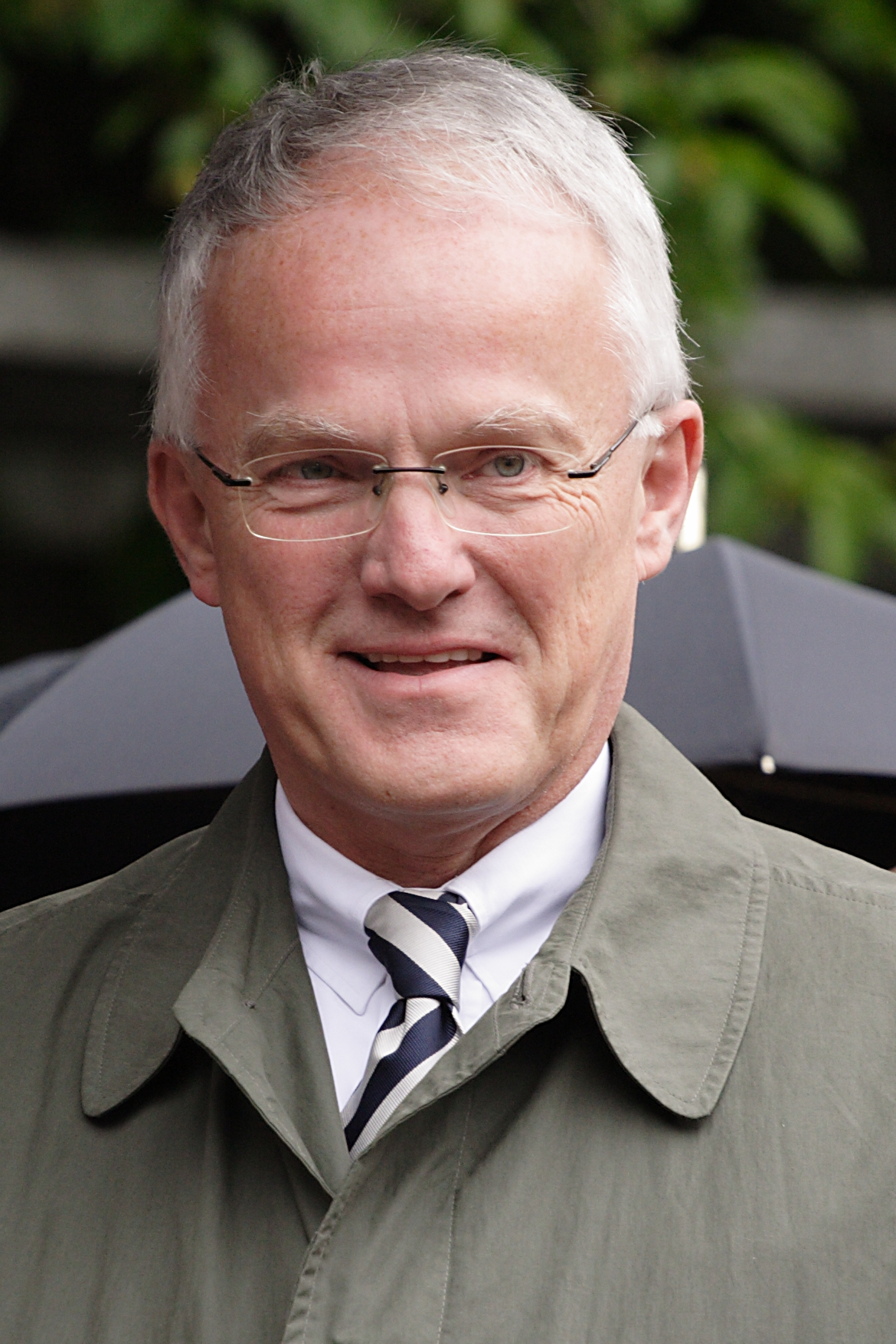
Jürgen Rüttgers 2000–2010

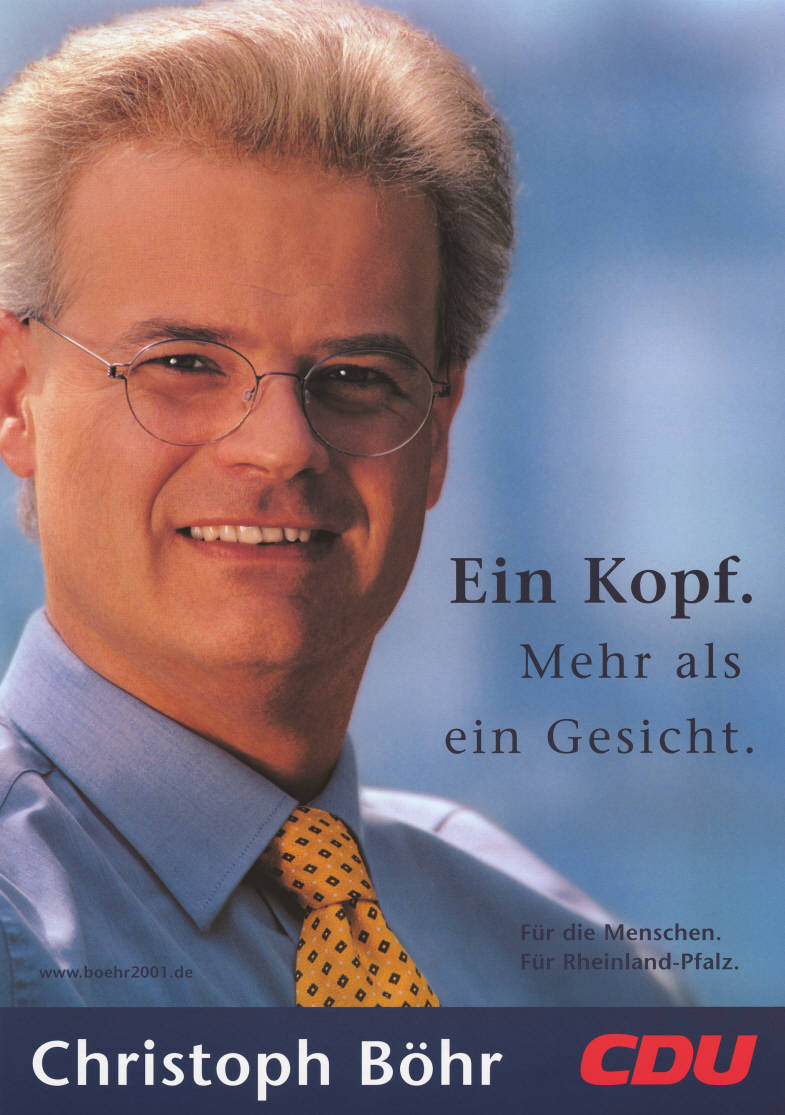
Christoph Böhr 2002–2006

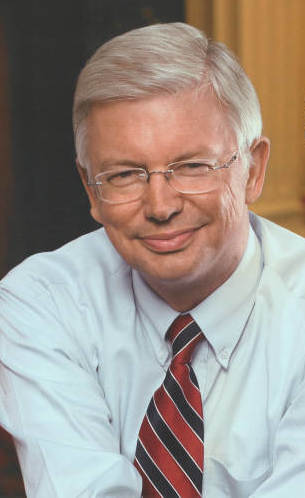
Roland Koch 2006–2010

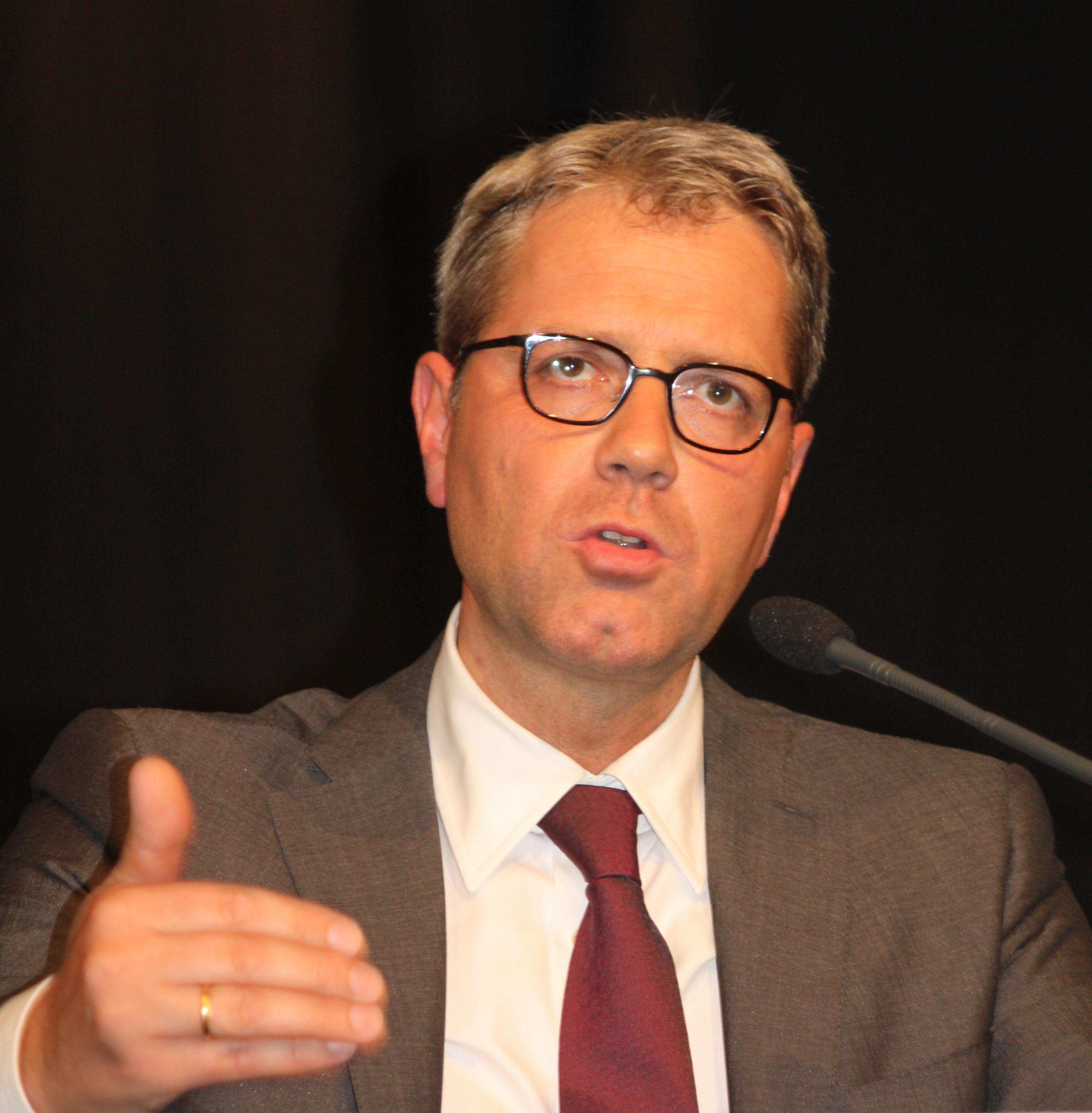
Norbert Röttgen 2010–2012

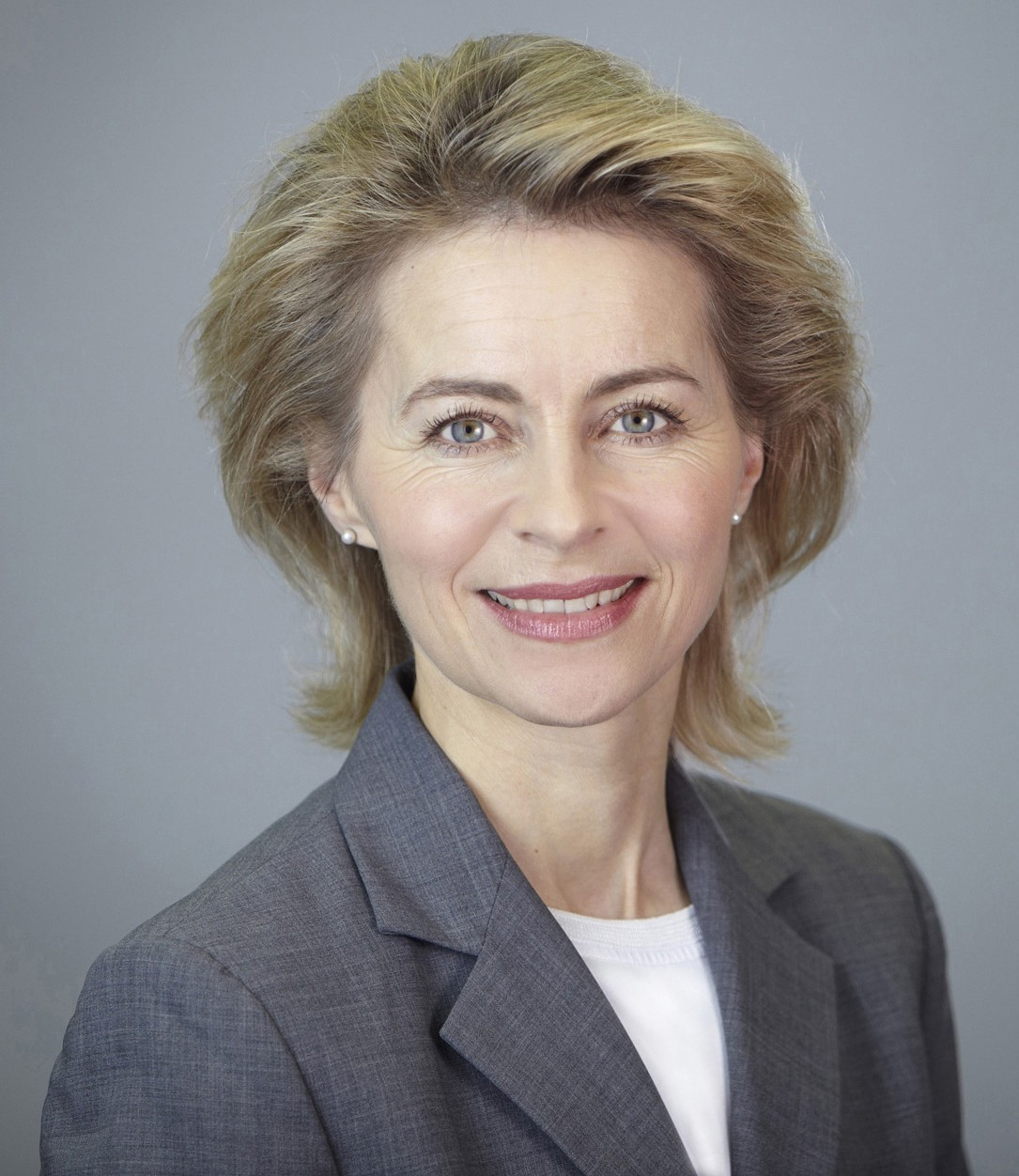
Ursula von der Leyen 2010–2019

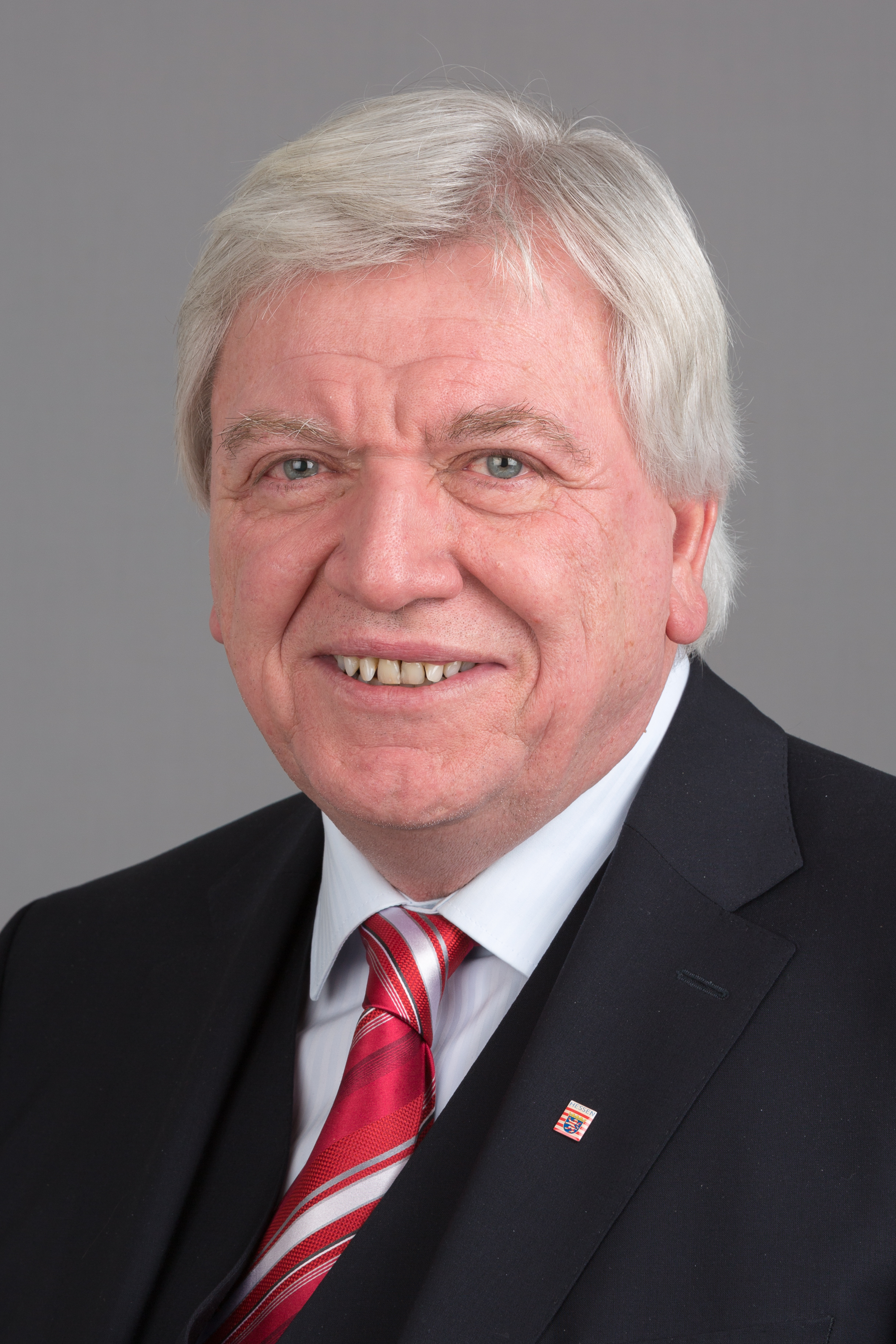
Volker Bouffier 2010–2022

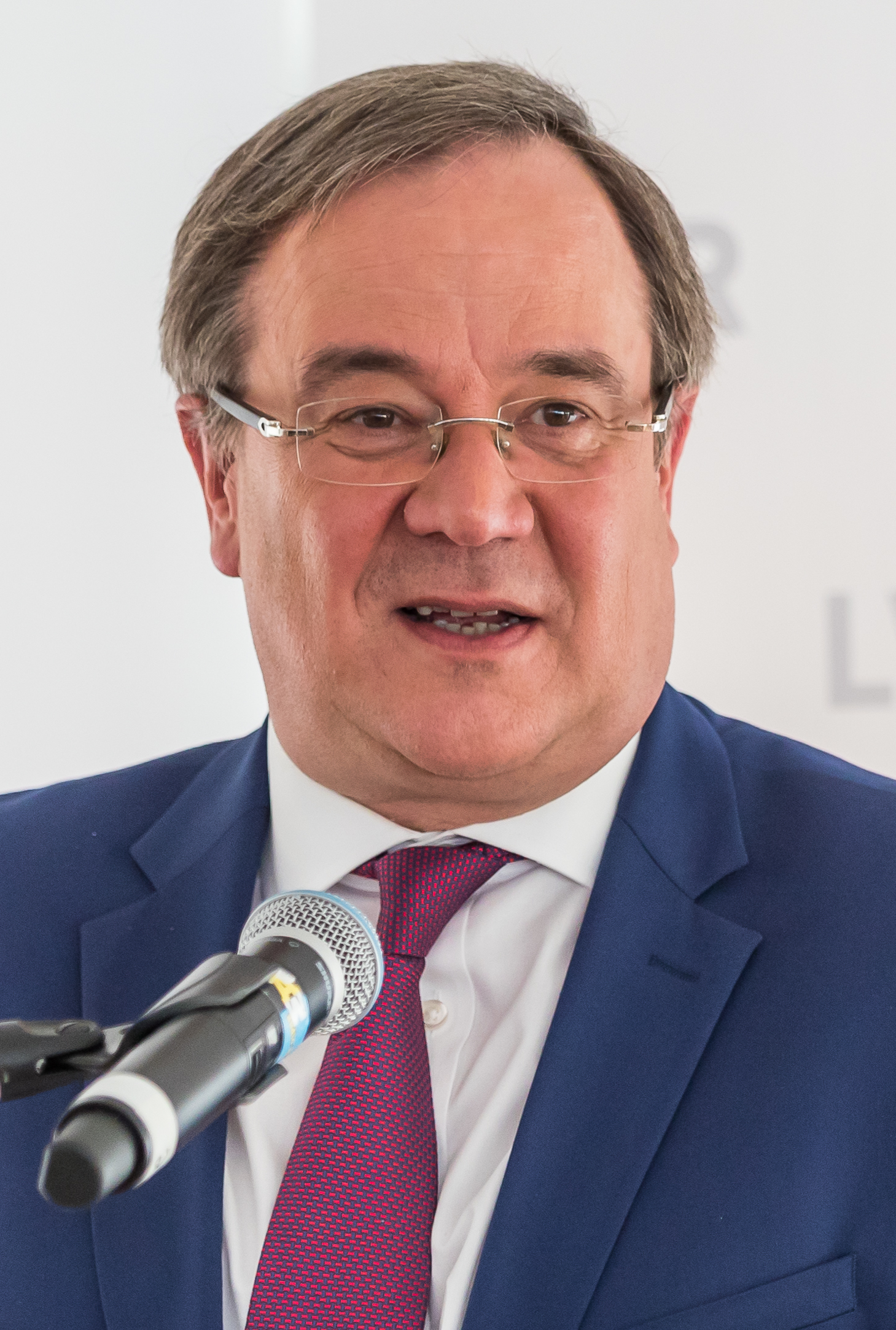
Armin Laschet 2012–2021

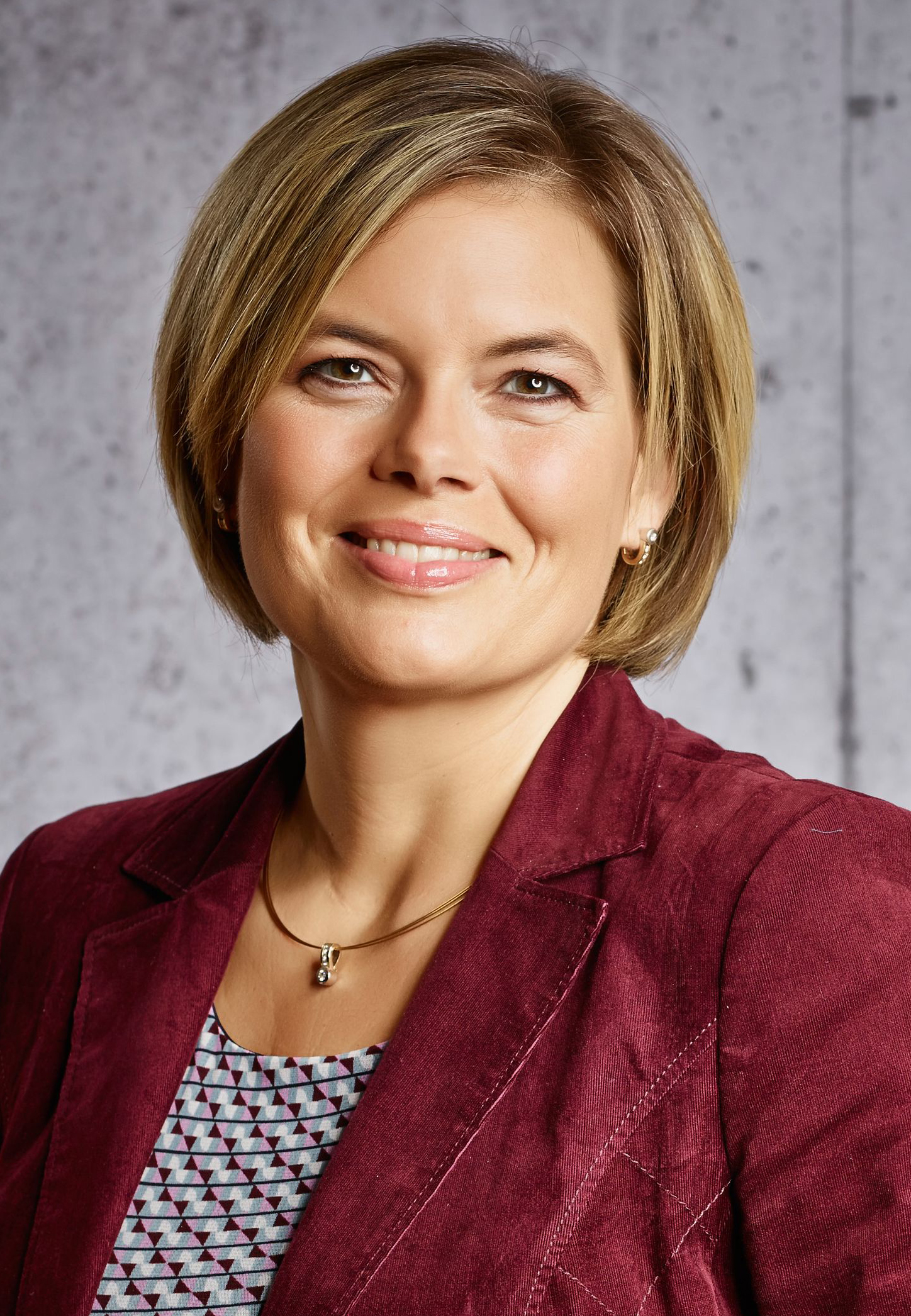
Julia Klöckner 2012–2022

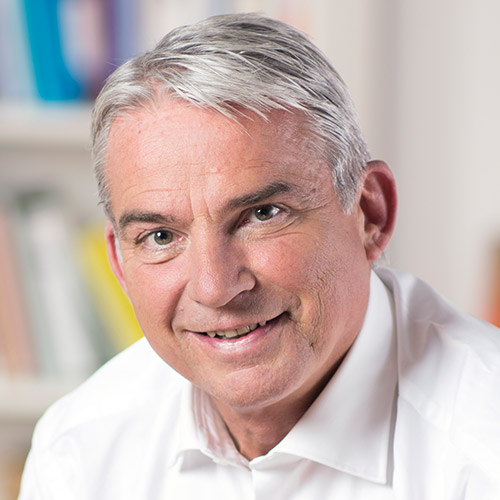
Thomas Strobl 2012–2022

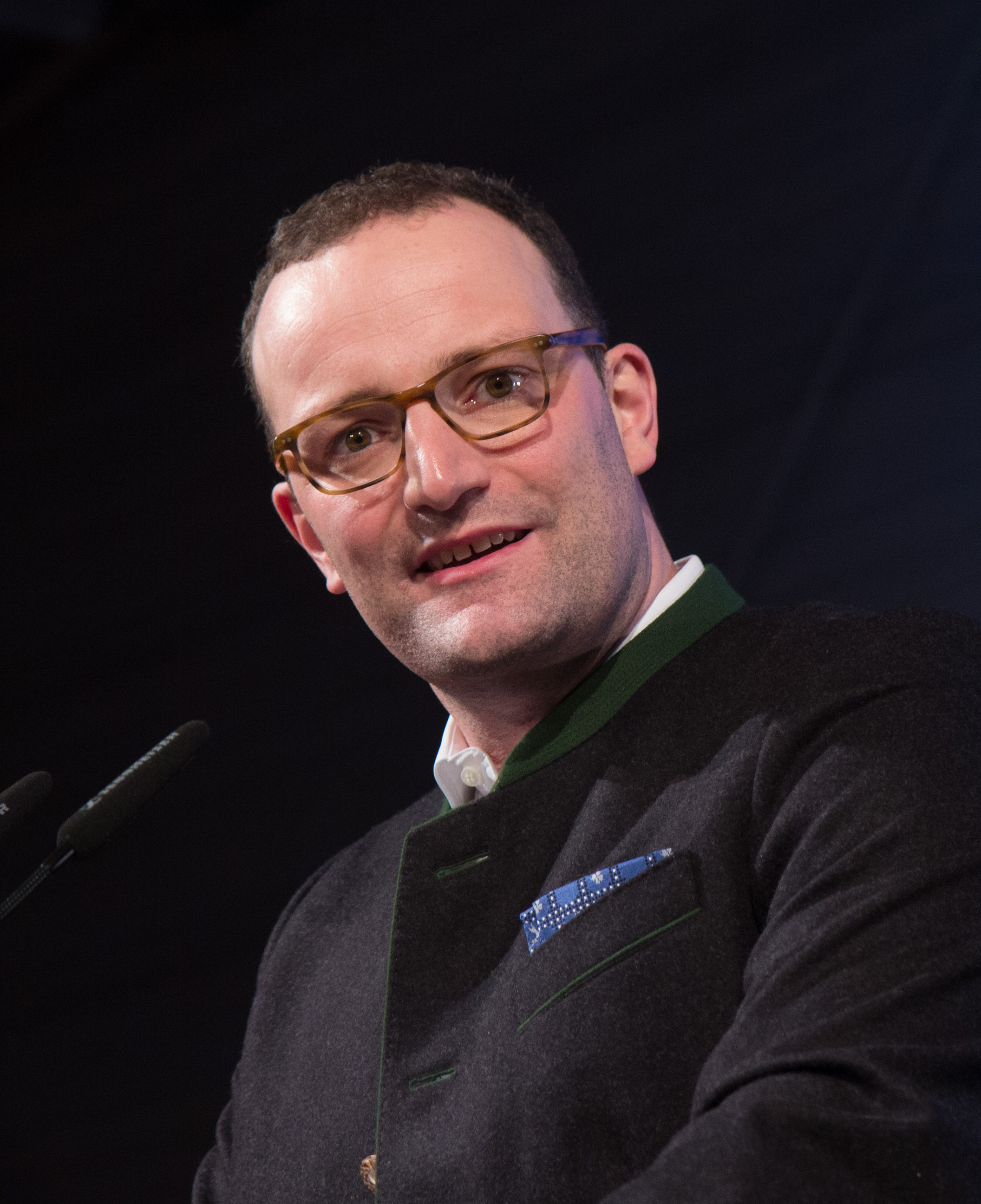
Jens Spahn 2021–2022

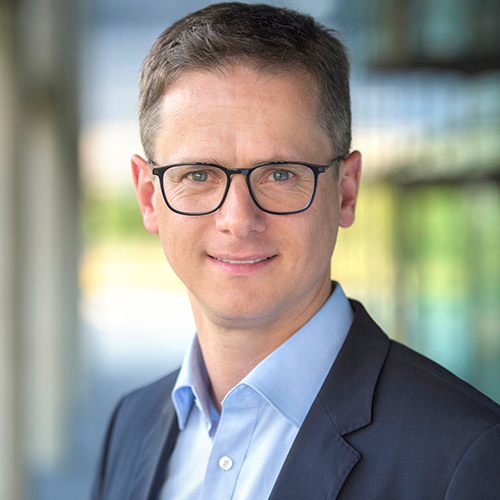
Carsten Linnemann 2022–2023

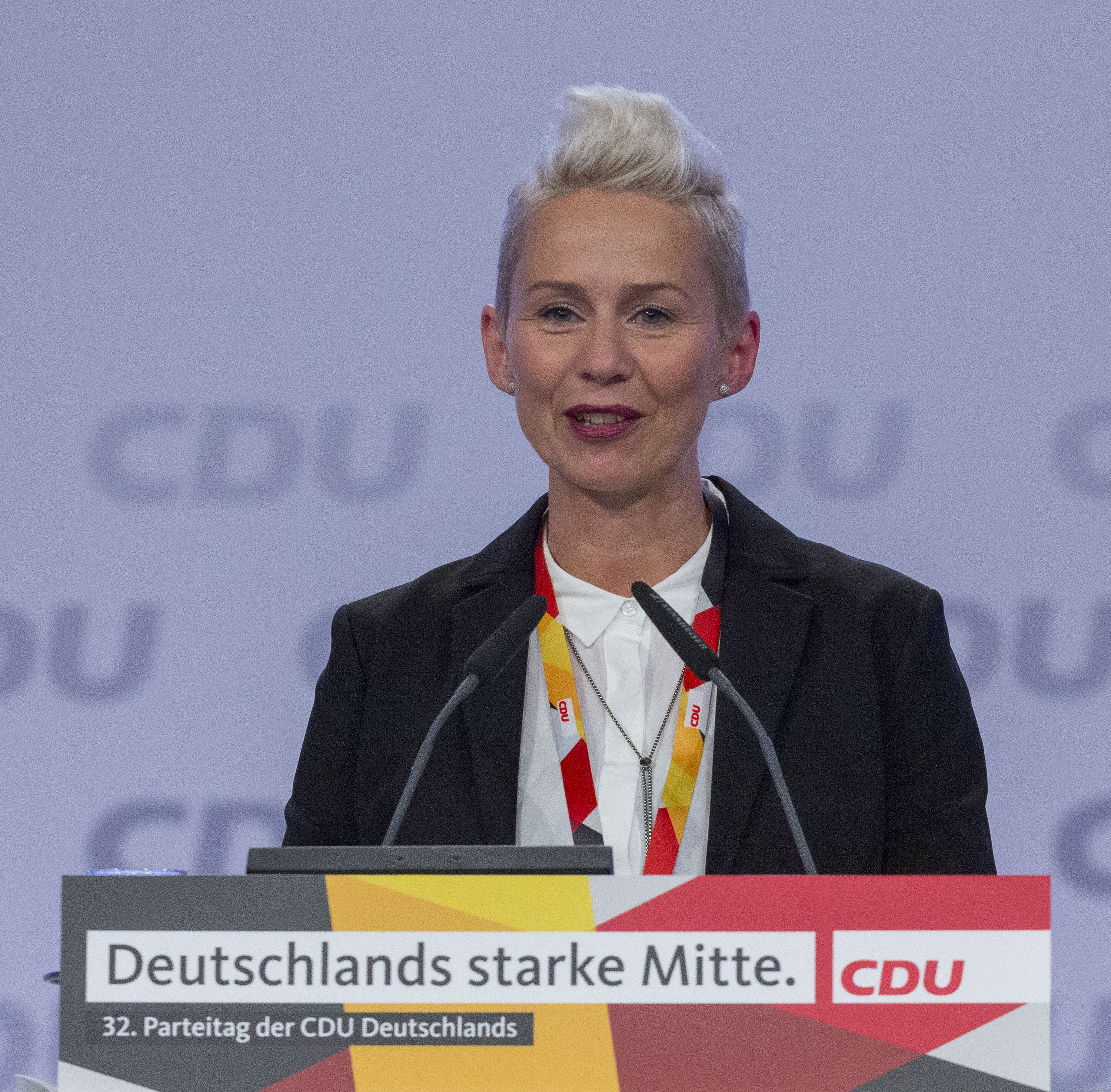
Silvia Breher since 2019

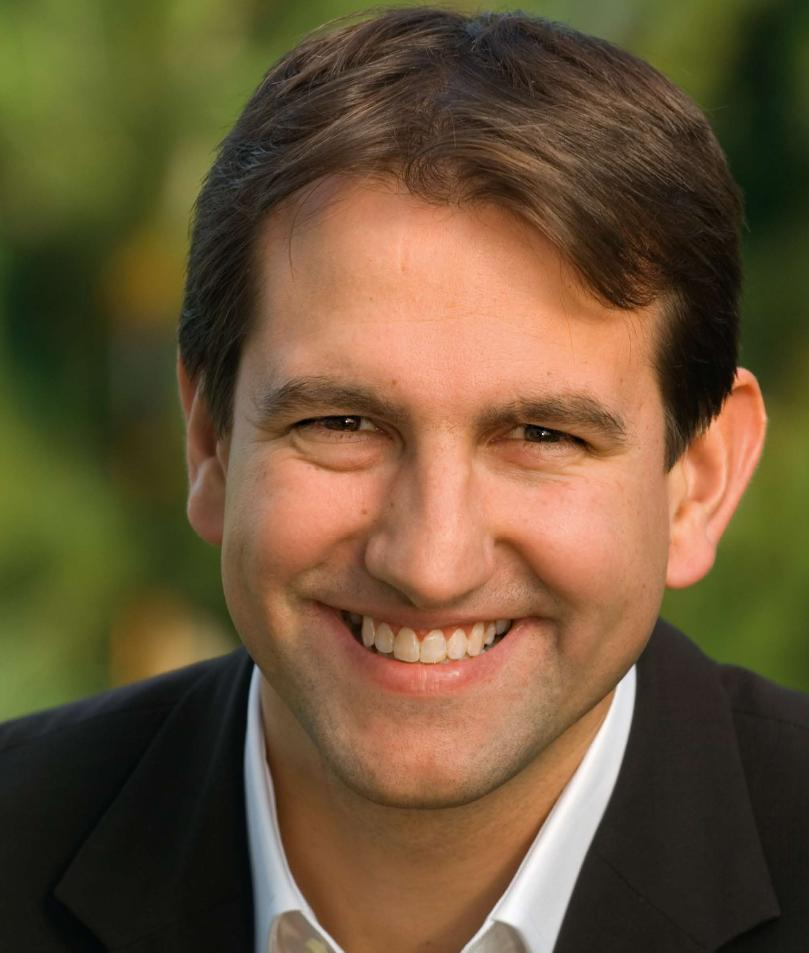
Andreas Jung since 2022

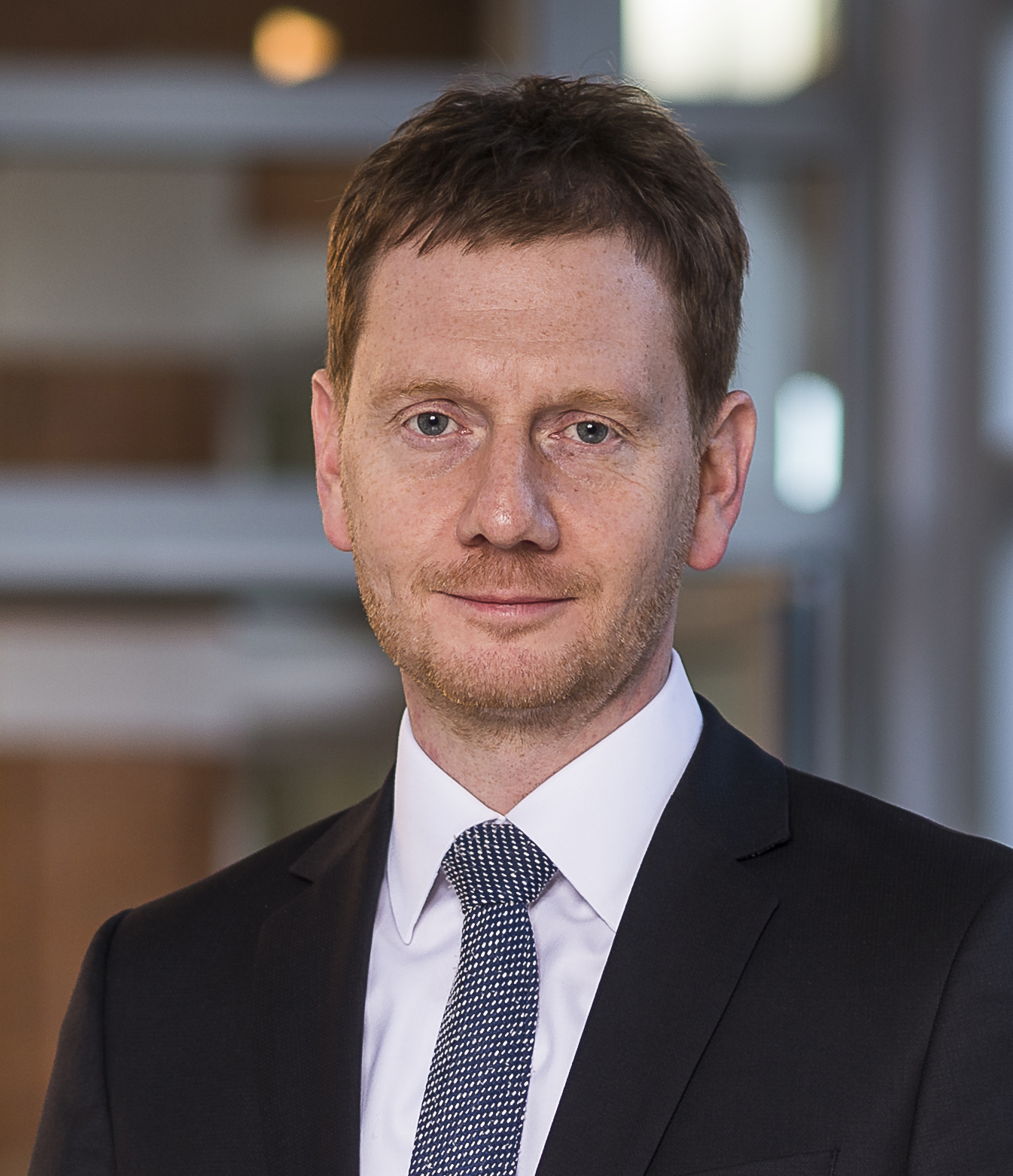
Michael Kretschmer since 2022

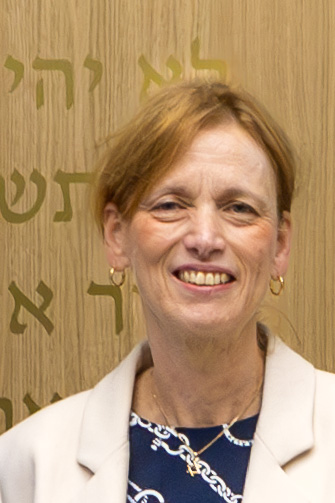
Karin Prien since 2022

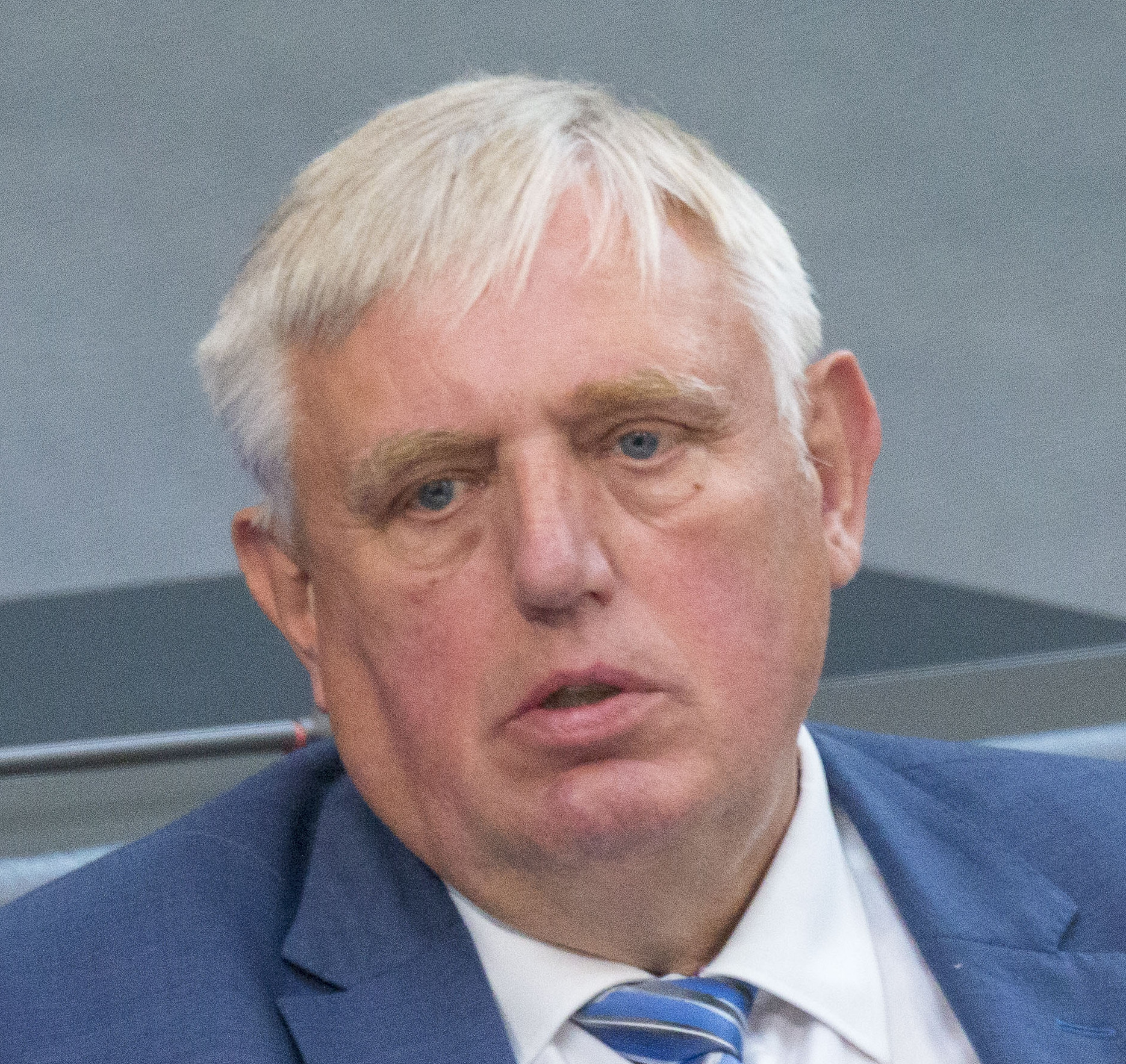
Karl-Josef Laumann since 2024

== See also ==
- SPD Party Executive Committee
- Board of the UK Conservative Party
