= Ines Claus =

German politician (born 1977)

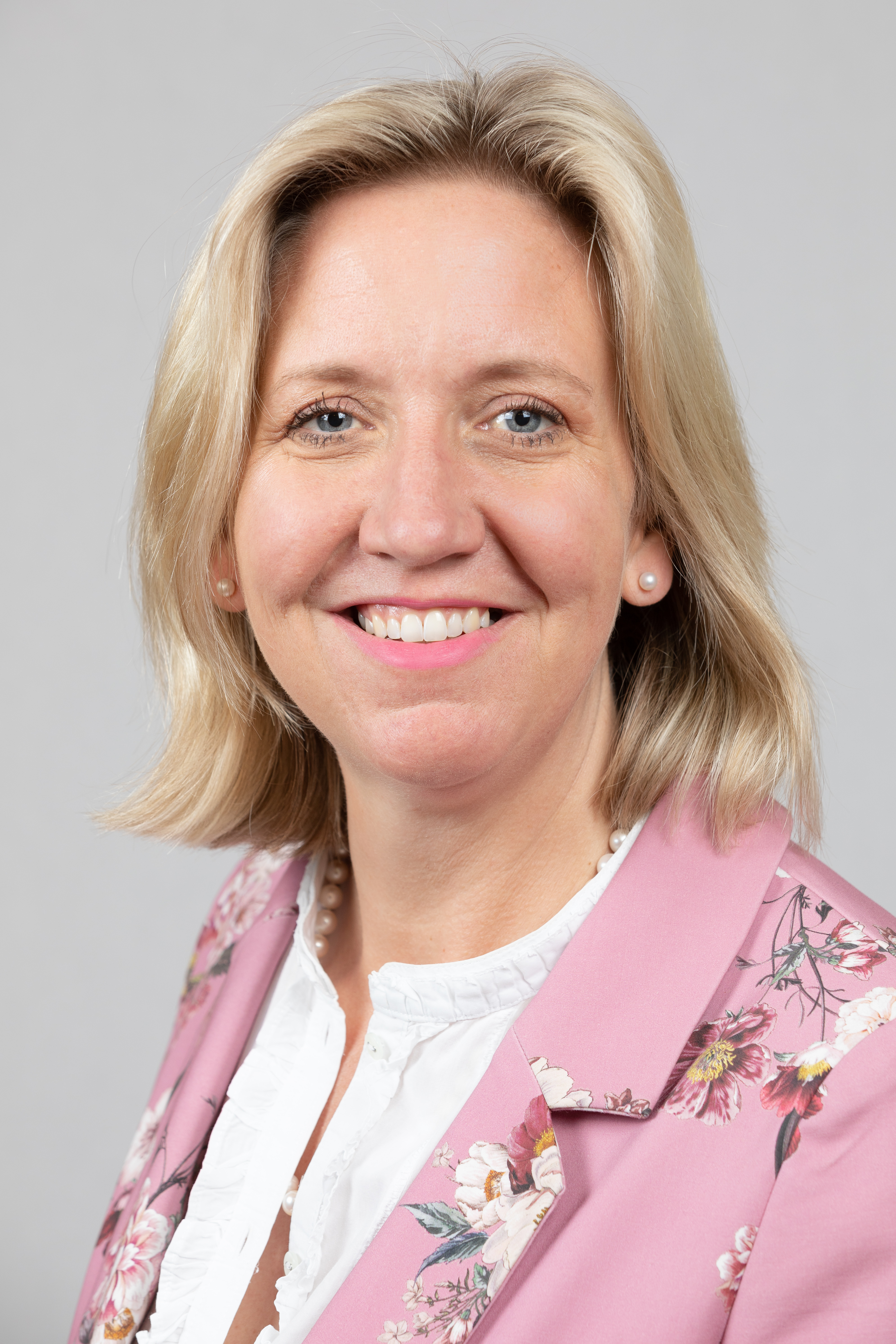
- Claus in 2019

Member of the Landtag of Hesse
- Incumbent
- Assumed office 28 October 2018

Personal details
- Born: 28 July 1977 (age 48)
- Party: Christian Democratic Union (since 1998)

Ines Claus (born 28 July 1977) is a German politician serving as a member of the Landtag of Hesse since 2018. She has served as group leader of the Christian Democratic Union since 2020. She has been a member of the presidium of the Christian Democratic Union since 2022.
