= Birte Glißmann =

German politician (born 1992)

Member of the Landtag of Schleswig-Holstein
- Incumbent
- Assumed office 7 June 2022
- Preceded by: Beate Raudies
- Constituency: Elmshorn

Personal details
- Born: 3 December 1992 (age 33)
- Party: Christian Democratic Union

Birte Glißmann (born 3 December 1992) is a German politician serving as a member of the Landtag of Schleswig-Holstein since 2022. She has been a member of the national board of the CDU since 2022.
