= Jessica Steiner =

German politician (born 1990)

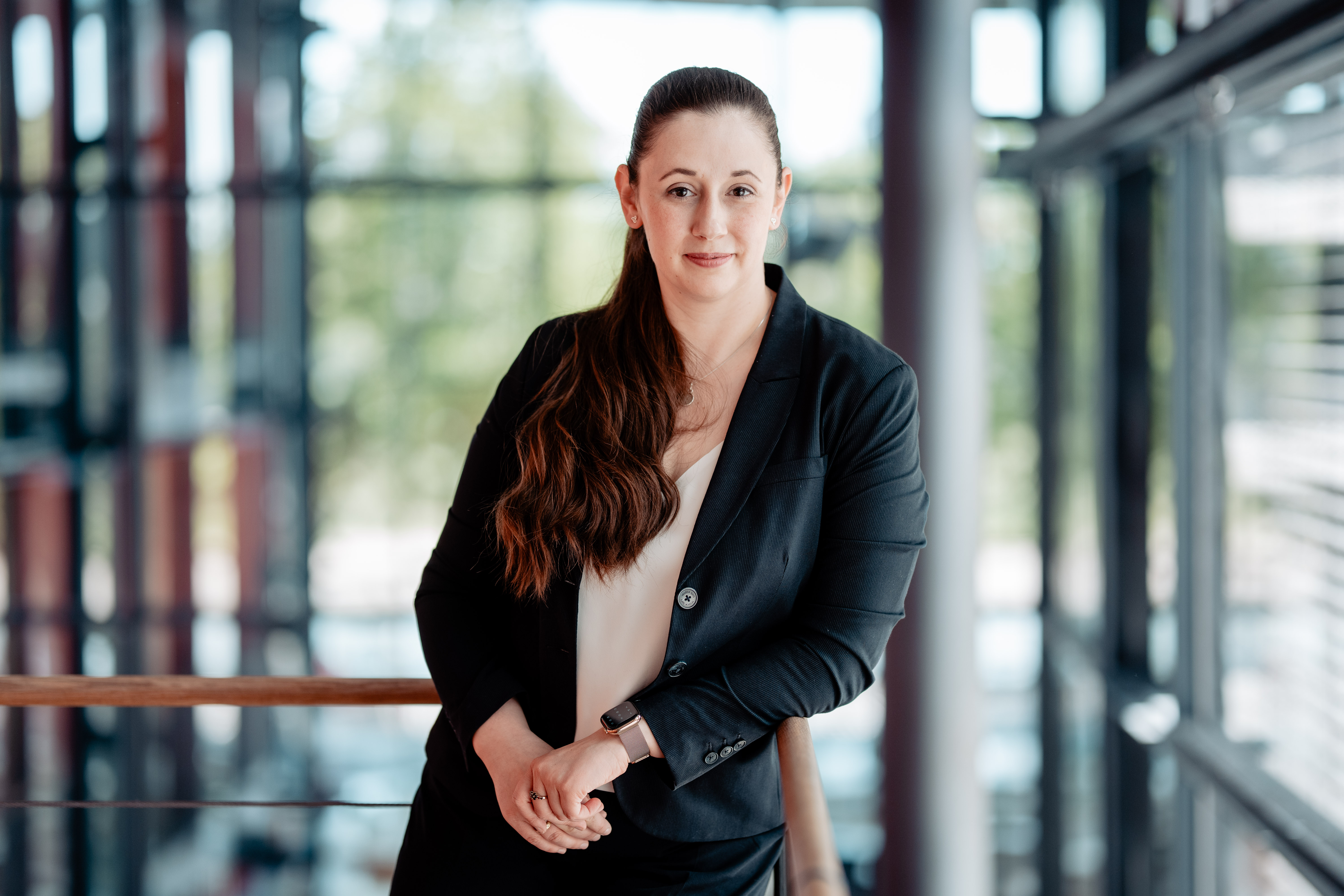
- Steiner in 2025

Member of the Landtag of Saxony
- Incumbent
- Assumed office 1 October 2024

Personal details
- Born: 1990 (age 35–36)
- Party: Christian Democratic Union

Jessica Steiner (née Heller; born 1990) is a German politician serving as a member of the Landtag of Saxony since 2024. She has been a member of the national board of the CDU since 2022. From 2014 to 2025, she was a city councillor of Leipzig.
