= Weinheim (electoral district) =

State electoral district of Germany

39: Weinheim
- Electoral district for the Landtag of Baden-Württemberg
- Weinheim in 2026
- District: Rhein-Neckar-Kreis
- Electorate: 108,849 (2026)
- Major settlements: Dossenheim, Edingen-Neckarhausen, Heddesheim, Hemsbach, Hirschberg an der Bergstraße, Ilvesheim, Ladenburg, Laudenbach, Schriesheim, and Weinheim

Current electoral district
- Party: CDU
- Member: Bastian Schneider

Weinheim is an electoral constituency (German: Wahlkreis) represented in the Landtag of Baden-Württemberg.

Since 2026, it has elected one member via first-past-the-post voting. Voters cast a second vote under which additional seats are allocated proportionally state-wide. Under the constituency numbering system, it is designated as constituency 39.

It is wholly within the district of Rhein-Neckar-Kreis.

== Geography ==
The constituency includes the municipalities of Dossenheim, Edingen-Neckarhausen, Heddesheim, Hemsbach, Hirschberg an der Bergstraße, Ilvesheim, Ladenburg, Laudenbach, Schriesheim, and Weinheim, within the district of Rhein-Neckar-Kreis.

There were 108,849 eligible voters in 2026.

== Members ==
=== First mandate ===
Both prior to and since the electoral reforms for the 2026 election, the winner of the plurality of the vote (first-past-the-post) in every constituency won the first mandate.

| Election | Member | Party | % |
|---|---|---|---|
| 1976 | Gerhart Scheuer | CDU | |
| 1980 | Gerhart Scheuer | CDU | |
| 1984 | Gerhart Scheuer | CDU | |
| 1988 | Hans Lorenz | CDU | |
| 1992 | Hans Lorenz | CDU | |
| 1996 | Georg Wacker | CDU | |
| 2001 | Georg Wacker | CDU | 42.6 |
| 2006 | Georg Wacker | CDU | 42.6 |
| 2011 | Georg Wacker | CDU | 35.0 |
| 2016 | Hans-Ulrich Sckerl | Grüne | 29.2 |
| 2021 | Hans-Ulrich Sckerl | Grüne | 35.6 |
| Feb 2022 | Fadime Tuncer | Grüne | 35.6 |
| 2026 | Bastian Schneider | CDU | 33.0 |

=== Second mandate ===
Prior to the electoral reforms for the 2026 election, the seats in the state parliament were allocated proportionately amongst parties which received more than 5% of valid votes across the state. The seats that were won proportionally for parties that did not win as many first mandates as seats they were entitled to, were allocated to their candidates which received the highest proportion of the vote in their respective constituencies. This meant that following some elections, a constituency would have one or more members elected under a second mandate.

Prior to 2011, these second mandates were allocated to the party candidates who got the greatest number of votes, whilst from 2011-2021, these were allocated according to percentage share of the vote.

| Election | Member | Party | Member | Party | Member | Party |
|---|---|---|---|---|---|---|
| 1976 | Wolfgang Daffinger | SPD | | | | |
| 1980 | Wolfgang Daffinger | SPD | | | | |
| 1984 | Wolfgang Daffinger | SPD | | | | |
| 1988 | Wolfgang Daffinger | SPD | Bernhard Scharf | FDP | Jürgen Rochlitz | Grüne |
| 1992 | Wolfgang Daffinger | SPD | Bernhard Scharf | FDP | | |
| 1996 | Hans Georg Junginger | SPD | Hans Freudenberg | FDP | | |
| Dec 1998 | Hans Georg Junginger | SPD | Lieselotte Schweikert | FDP | | |
| 2001 | Hans Georg Junginger | SPD | | | | |
| 2006 | Hans Georg Junginger | SPD | Birgit Arnold | FDP | Hans-Ulrich Sckerl | Grüne |
| Sep 2009 | Gerhard Kleinböck | SPD | Birgit Arnold | FDP | Hans-Ulrich Sckerl | Grüne |
| 2011 | Gerhard Kleinböck | SPD | | | Hans-Ulrich Sckerl | Grüne |
| 2016 | Gerhard Kleinböck | SPD | Georg Wacker | CDU | | |
| Jan 2018 | Gerhard Kleinböck | SPD | Julia Philippi | CDU | | |
| 2021 | Sebastian Cuny | SPD | | | | |

== Election results ==
=== 2026 election ===
State election (2026): Weinheim
| Notes: | Blue background denotes the winner of the electorate vote. Pink background denotes a candidate elected from their party list. Yellow background denotes an electorate win by a list member, or other incumbent. A ✓ or ✗ denotes status of any incumbent, win or lose respectively. | | | | | | |
| Party | Candidate | Votes | % | ±% | Party votes | % | ±% |
|---|---|---|---|---|---|---|---|
| CDU | Bastian Schneider | 25,445 | 33.0 | ▲10.4 | 21,940 | 28.4 | ▲5.8 |
| Greens | ✗ Fadime Tuncer | 22,255 | 28.9 | ▼6.7 | 26,373 | 34.1 | ▼1.4 |
| AfD | Christian Schäfer | 10,602 | 13.8 | ▲5.9 | 10,774 | 13.9 | ▲6.1 |
| SPD | Sébastian Cuny | 9,027 | 11/7 | ▼1.7 | 6,130 | 7.9 | ▼5.4 |
| Left | Justus Heine | 3,679 | 4.8 | ▲1.2 | 3,578 | 4.6 | ▲1.0 |
| FDP | Christian Schwarz | 2,838 | 3.7 | ▼4.9 | 3,137 | 4.1 | ▼4.5 |
| FW | | | | | 1,403 | 1.8 | ▼1.1 |
| BSW | | | | | 856 | 1.1 | |
| Volt | Kevin Grimmeisen | 1,359 | 1.8 | ▲1.0 | 852 | 1.1 | ▲0.3 |
| APT | | | | | 827 | 1.1 | |
| PARTEI | Jessica Vierling | 1,134 | 1.5 | ▼0.2 | 478 | 0.6 | ▼1.0 |
| Independent | Monika Jiang | 757 | 1.0 | | | | |
| dieBasis | | | | | 261 | 0.3 | ▼0.8 |
| Pensioners | | | | | 154 | 0.2 | |
| Values | | | | | 124 | 0.2 | |
| Bündnis C | | | | | 79 | 0.1 | |
| ÖDP | | | | | 66 | 0.1 | ▼0.6 |
| KlimalisteBW | | | | | 59 | 0.1 | ▼0.7 |
| Team Todenhöfer | | | | | 53 | 0.1 | |
| PdF | | | | | 51 | 0.1 | |
| Verjüngungsforschung | | | | | 36 | 0.0 | |
| Humanists | | | | | 32 | 0.0 | |
| Informal votes | | 549 | | | 382 | | |
| Total valid votes | | 77,096 | | | 77,263 | | |
| Turnout | | 77,645 | 71.3 | ▲3.9 | | | |
| CDU gain from Greens | Majority | 3,190 | 4.1 | | | | |

=== 2021 election ===
State election (2021): Weinheim
| Party | Candidate | Votes | % | ±% |
|---|---|---|---|---|
| Greens | Hans-Ulrich Sckerl | 25,500 | 35.6 | ▲6.4 |
| CDU | Julia Philippi | 16,198 | 22.6 | ▼3.2 |
| SPD | Sebastian Cuny | 9,577 | 13.4 | ▼1.9 |
| FDP | Alexander Kohl | 6,137 | 8.6 | ▼0.2 |
| AfD | Robert Schmidt | 5,633 | 7.9 | ▼7.3 |
| Left | Detlef Gräser | 2,592 | 3.6 | ▲0.6 |
| FW | Stephan Frauenkron | 2,084 | 2.9 | |
| PARTEI | Felix Illert | 1,162 | 1.6 | |
| dieBasis | Peter Ullmann | 793 | 1.1 | |
| KlimalisteBW | Sieglinde Wiese-Striegel | 581 | 0.8 | |
| Volt | Robin Fleige | 580 | 0.8 | |
| ÖDP | Klara Bronberger | 503 | 0.7 | Steady |
| WiR2020 | Uwe Kempermann | 322 | 0.4 | |
| Majority | | 9,302 | 13.0 | |
| Rejected ballots | | 644 | 0.9 | ▼0.2 |
| Turnout | | 72,306 | 67.5 | ▼6.2 |
| Registered electors | | 107,170 | | |
| Greens hold | | Swing | | |

== See also ==
- Politics of Baden-Württemberg
- Landtag of Baden-Württemberg
