= Kim-Sarah Speer =

German politician (born 1993)

Member of the Landtag of Hesse
- Incumbent
- Assumed office 8 October 2023

Personal details
- Born: 2 August 1993 (age 32)
- Party: Christian Democratic Union

Kim-Sarah Speer (born 2 August 1993) is a German politician serving as a member of the Landtag of Hesse since 2023. She has been a member of the national board of the CDU since 2024.
