= Carina Hermann =

German politician (born 1984)

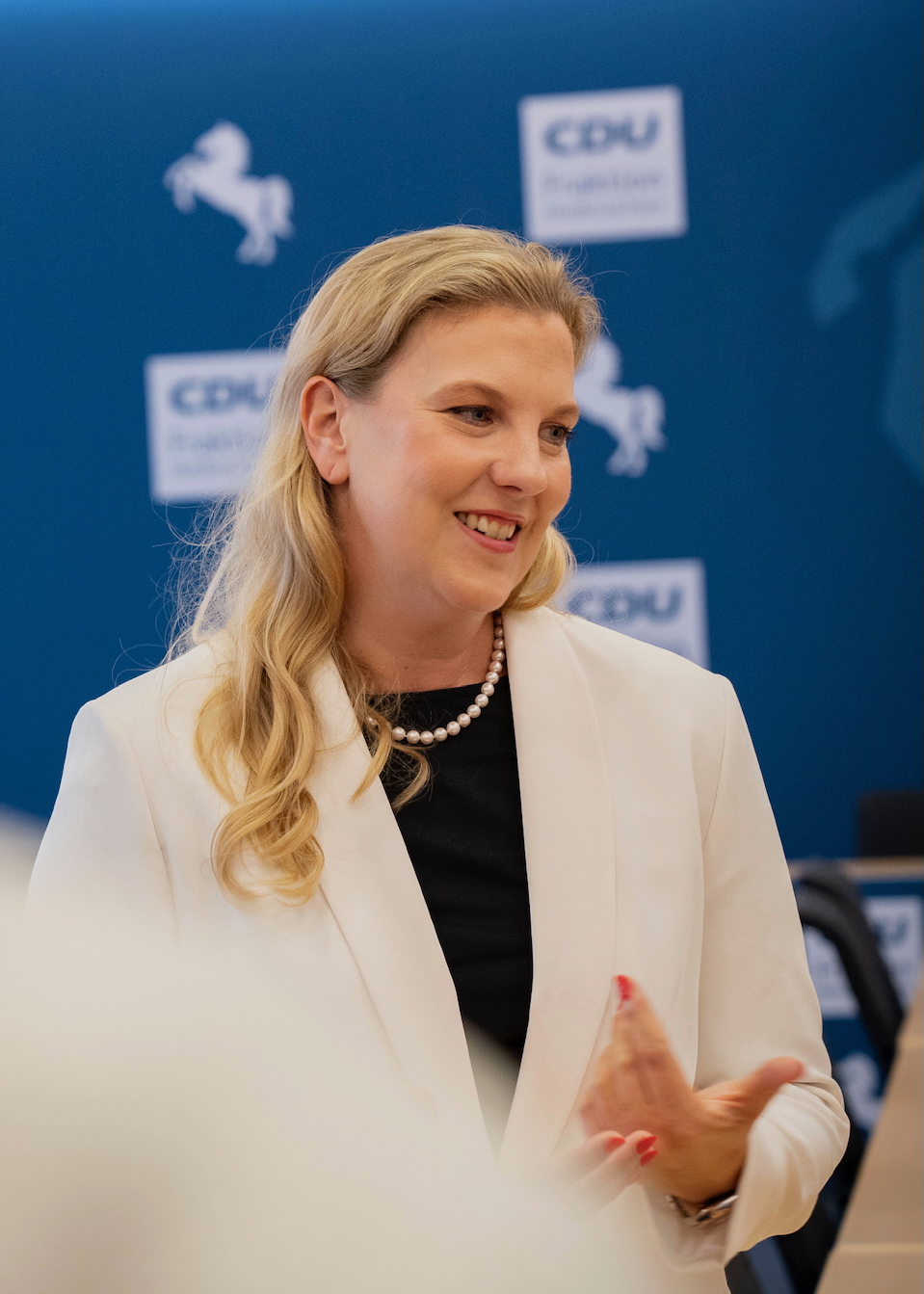
- Hermann in 2023

Member of the Landtag of Lower Saxony
- Incumbent
- Assumed office 8 November 2022

Personal details
- Born: 19 December 1984 (age 41)
- Party: Christian Democratic Union

Carina Hermann (born 19 December 1984) is a German politician serving as a member of the Landtag of Lower Saxony since 2022. She has been a member of the national board of the CDU since 2024.
