= Marc Speicher =

German politician (born 1984)

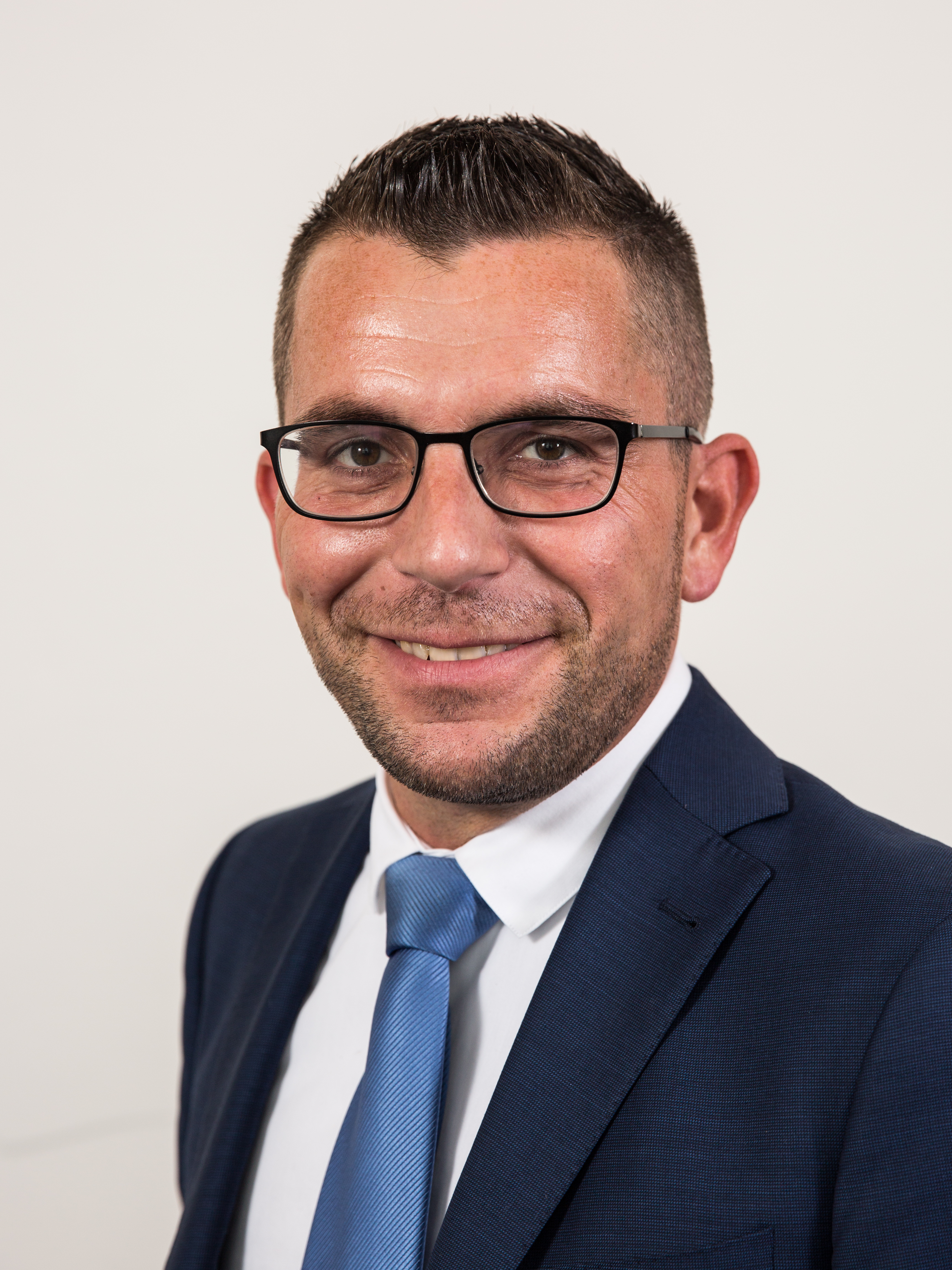
Marc Speicher (2017)

Marc Daniel Johannes Speicher (born 3 November 1984) is a German politician and a member of the Landtag of Saarland.

== Education and career ==
Marc Speicher was born in Roden, a part of Saarlouis. After passing his A-levels in Saarlouis at the Robert-Schuman-Gymnasium and completing a banker apprenticeship, he became a student at the University of Saarland. While studying economy and law, he continued working as a banker. He was a lecturer and also a member of the General Students’ Committee. Later, Marc Speicher became an advisor for Peter Altmaier and Anette Hübinger who were members of the German parliament. He had been an advisor for planning and policy of the CDU Saar, press officer for Annegret Kramp-Karrenbauer as she was state executive and Roland Theis as general secretary before Speicher was elected to be a member of the Landtag of Saarland.

== Party policy ==
At the age of 14, he joined the Junge Union (JU) and two years later, in 2000, he joined the CDU.

In 1999, he founded the JU in his home town and has been the president of this organization for 14 years. 2005, Speicher became a council member in Saarlouis. He has been JU-president of the city association in Saarlouis from 2002 to 2013 and JU-president of the district association from 2012 to 2016. Speicher has also been a member of the German JU Commission for economy. He is part of the state executive committee of the JU Saar since 2005 and of the Christian Democratic Employees' Association since 2002 and its president of district association from 2015 to 2018. 2017 he became a member of the federal executive board of the CDA and acting state executive of the CDA-Saarland. Marc Speicher operated as a press officer and an advisor for policy of the CDU Saar from 2014 to 2017.

November 4, 2017 was the day when CDU-Saar elected him as their first commissioner of membership. He also is the local president of the CDU in Roden. He is the political manager of the CDU district association in Saarland. Following Georg Jungmann, Marc Speicher is holding the presidency for CDU-district association in Saarlouis.

== State Parliament ==
Marc Speicher was elected 2017 to the 16th Landtag of Saarland by being part of the CDU fraction. He is the CDU chairman of the working group as to labour issues, politics of labour, industry, and energy in Saarland. He is part of the committees for budget and finances, economy, labour, energy, and traffic and jury for budget calculations. From 2017 to 2018, he has been part of the committee for data privacy and information security. His membership in the committee for mine safety and handling of disuses mines lasted from 2017 to 2019. The CDU made him a part of the committee of enquiry regarding "system in sports funding" which investigates affairs about proceedings in federal sport clubs. Marc Speicher followed Alexander Funk as the chairman of the committee for budget calculations in year 2018. He was sent by the CDU to participate at the Enquête-Commission in the year 2019 regarding the subject of digitalization.

== Other matters ==
Speicher is one of the authors who wrote the book Chronik der Stadt Saarlouis 1680–2005 which is about the history of the city Saarlouis. Together with the manager of the city museum, he created the special exhibition100 Jahre Hauptbahnhof Saarlouis. Speicher is also a board member of the friends‘ association called „Die Rodener" and also part of the historical association in Roden, of the Geschichtswerkstatt Saarlouis, and of the association for local history. 2001 he published the book Roden im Wandel der Geschichte.

Organizations which he is part of are: Presseclub Saar, the economical association “wiwis united”, “Bundesverband Deutscher Volks- und Betriebswirte”, European Union/Union of European federalists, and the German-Atlantic society.

In his role as a council member, he is part of the main and finance committee, of the plant committee of owner-operated municipal enterprises, of economic promotion, of city marketing and tourism, property, and of culture. Representing the city Saarlouis, he is part of the supervisory council concerning the non-profit building and estate society, of the supervisory council concerning municipal utilities and networks in Saarlouis, of the advisory committee for integration, and of the advisory committee of the folk high school in Saarlouis.
