= Weinheimer =

Weinheimer is a German surname. Notable people with the surname include:

- Frank Weinheimer (1887–?), American politician
- John J. Weinheimer (c. 1896 – 1951), American football player and coach

== See also ==
- Paula Hahn-Weinheimer (1917–2002), German geochemist
