= Bastian Schneider =

German politician (born 1990)

Member of the Landtag of Baden-Württemberg
- Incumbent
- Assumed office 11 May 2026
- Constituency: Weinheim

Personal details
- Born: 1990 (age 35–36)
- Party: Christian Democratic Union

Bastian Schneider (born 1990) is a German politician who was elected member of the Landtag of Baden-Württemberg in 2026. He has been a member of the national board of the CDU since 2022.
