= Spiro (name) =

Spiro is a given name among Greek-speaking populations, Albanians, and the Christians of Lebanon. It also is a surname with a variety of origins.

== As a name ==
As a Greek name, Spiro may also be spelled Spyro. It comes from the Greek Spiros/Spyros/Speros (Greek: Σπύρος, Greek pronunciation: [ˈspiros]), a shortened form of the archaic-sounding Spyridon (Greek: Σπυρίδων, Greek pronunciation: [spiˈriðon]), which means "basket used to carry seeds" (from σπυρί, grain, seed) in ancient Greek. It has a nominative final "s" that is usually dropped when Anglicised. Spiros/Spyros is a male given name fairly common in Greek-speaking population (in Greece, especially in Corfu, whose patron saint is Saint Spyridon, in Cyprus and among the Greek diaspora) as well as among the Christians of Lebanon where it is a common first and last name. The Greek diminutives for Spirydon are Pipis (Πίπης) and Pipeto (Πιπέτο).

Špiro is also a masculine given name in Croatia and Montenegro.

=== Spiro ===
People with the given name Spiro include:

- Spiro Agnew (1918–1996), thirty-ninth vice president of the United States
- Spiro Cheriogotis, American politician from Alabama
- Spiro Debarski (1933–2026), Bulgarian footballer
- Spiro Malakellis (born 1968), Australian rules footballer of Greek descent
- Spiro Malas (1933–2019), Greek-American actor
- Spiro Moisiu (1900–1981), Albanian general

=== Spiros/Spyros ===
People with the given name Spiros include:

- Spyridon Louis (1873–1940), Greek gold medallist of the first modern Olympic Marathon
  - Spiros Louis Stadium, the Athens Olympic Stadium named after Louis
- Spiros Marangos (born 1967), Greek footballer
- Spiros Markezinis (1909–2000), Greek politician
- Spyros Moustakas (1914–2002), Greek writer
- Spyros Paliouras (1875–1957), Greek writer
- Spyros B. Pavlides, Greek geologist
- Spyros Samaras (1861–1917), Greek composer of the Olympic Anthem
- Spyros Skouras (1893–1971), Greek-American chairman of Twentieth Century Fox from 1942 to 1962
- Spyros Spyromilios (1864–1930), Greek Gendarmerie officer
- Spyros Vallas (born 1981), Greek football player
- Spiros Velentzas, American Greek Mob Boss
- Spyros Vrettos (born 1960), Greek poet
- Spiros Zodhiates (1922–2009), Greek-American author
- Spyros Gogolos (born 1978), Greek footballer
- Spyros Kastanas (born 1962), Cypriot footballer
- Spyros Koulkoudinas, Greek politician
- Spyros Kyriakis, Greek politician
- Spyros Kyprianou (1932–2002), former president of Cyprus
- Spiros Latsis (born 1946), Greek businessman
- Spiros Livathinos (born 1955), Greek football player, coach, and current head scout

==== Fictional ====
- Spiros Vondas, fictional character on the HBO drama The Wire

== As a middle name ==
People with the names Spiro/Spiros/Spyros as a middle name include:

- George Spiro Dibie (1932–2022), American cinematographer
- Paul Spyros Sarbanes (1933–2020), former US Senator representing Maryland

== As a surname ==
In Germany, the surname Spiro originated as a corruption of Speyer, the name of a town in Rhineland-Palatinate. It is one of a number of Jewish surnames that originated this way, along with the better-known Shapiro.

People/objects/concepts with the surname Spiro include:

- Alyson Spiro, British actress
- Betty Spiro, birth name of Betty Miller (1910–1965), Irish author
- Bjørn Spiro (1909–1999), Danish film actor
- Ellen Spiro (born 1964), American documentary filmmaker
- Eugene Spiro (1874–1972), German and American painter
- Gideon Spiro (1935–2025), Israeli journalist and activist
- György Spiró (born 1946), Hungarian dramatist, novelist and essayist
- Harold Spiro (1925–1996), English songwriter
- Herbert Spiro (1924–2010), German-born American political scientist
- Jordana Spiro (born 1977), American actress
- Joseph Moses Spiro (c. 1770–1830), Austrian rabbi
- Lev L. Spiro, American film and television director
- Karl Spiro (1867–1932), German biologist and physical chemist
- Mark Spiro (1957–2024), American songwriter, musician, and record producer
- Melford Spiro (1920–2014), American cultural anthropologist
- Michel Spiro (born 1946), French physicist
- Peter J. Spiro (born 1961), American legal scholar
- Samantha Spiro (born 1968), British actor
- Samuel Spiro (d. 1814), Greek-born Argentine naval captain
  - ARA Spiro (P-43), the corvette of the Argentine Navy named after Samuel Spiro
- Sienna Spiro (born 2005), English singer-songwriter
- Stephen Spiro (1939–2007), American political activist

== See also ==
- Spirou
- Spira, a Jewish name sometimes also spelled "Spiro"
- Schapiro, Shapiro, Jewish surname
- Schapira, Shapira, Jewish surname
- Spire
