= Spiro =

Spiro(s) may refer to:

- Spiro, Oklahoma, a town in the U.S.
  - Spiro Mounds, an archaeological site
- Spiro (band), a British music group
- Spiro (name), including a list of people with the name
- Špiro, South Slavic masculine given name
- ARA Spiro, two ships of the Argentine Navy
- SS Spiro, an oil tanker
- Euler spiral, or spiro, a curve
- Spiro compound, a type of chemical structure
- Spironolactone, a medicine, often used in feminizing hormone therapy

== See also ==
- Spiro compound, a class of organic compound featuring two rings joined at one atom
- Spirou (comics), a Belgian comic strip character
- Spyro, a series of platformer video games
- Spira (disambiguation)
