= Spirou =

Spirou may refer to:

== In comics ==
- Spirou (character), the main character of the comics series Spirou et Fantasio and Le Petit Spirou
- Spirou (magazine), originally Le Journal de Spirou, Belgian weekly serial comics magazine
- Spirou (video game), a video game based on the comics series
- Spirou et Fantasio, comics series published in the serial journal and in hardcover book format
- Spirou et Fantasio (comic book), a 1948 comic book that precedes the official Spirou et Fantasio series
- Spirou et Fantasio (1993 TV series), 1993 animated series
- Spirou et Fantasio (2006 TV series), 2006 animated series

== Other ==
- Spirou Charleroi, Belgian professional basketball club
- Spiroudome, indoor arena in Charleroi, Belgium

== See also ==
- Spira (disambiguation)
- Spiro (disambiguation)
- Spiro (name)
