= Moustakas =

Moustakas (Greek: Μουστάκας) is a Greek surname. Notable people with the surname include:

- Clark Moustakas (1923–2012), American psychologist
- Dimitris Moustakas
- Dimitris Moustakas (footballer)
- Mike Moustakas (born 1988), American baseball player
- Sotiris Moustakas (1940–2007), Greek/Cypriot comedy actor
- Spyros Moustakas (1914–2002), Greek writer
- Theodore Moustakas, American engineer
