= Spiridon =

Spiridon may refer to:

- Spyridon or Spriridon, (Ancient Greek: Σπυρίδων; Greek: Σπυρίδωνας), a male given name and surname

== Places ==
- Spiridon Peninsula, Alaska
- Spiridon Bay, Alaska
- Spiridon Lake, Alaska

== Other uses ==
- Spiridon, a fictional planet in the Doctor Who serial Planet of the Daleks
- Spiridon, the title character of Spiridon the Mute a novel by Paschal Grousset
- Spiridon, a brand name for Spironolactone, a diuretic medication
- Spiridon (magazine), German running magazine named after Spyridon Louis

== See also ==
- Saint Spiridon Orthodox Cathedral, in Seattle, United States
