= Spyri =

Spyri is a Swiss surname. Notable people with the surname include:

- Emilie Kempin-Spyri (1853–1901), first Swiss female lawyer
- Johanna Spyri (1827–1901), Swiss author

== See also ==
- Spyra, another surname
