= List of Psi Chi chapters =

Psi Chi is an international honor society in psychology. Following is a list of Psi Chi chapters, with inactive institutions indicated in italics.

Chapter	Charter date and range	Location	Status	Ref.
Drake University	September 4, 1929	Des Moines, Iowa	Active	
Iowa State University	September 4, 1929	Ames, Iowa	Active	
Ohio University	September 4, 1929	Athens, Ohio	Active	
Rutgers University–New Brunswick	September 4, 1929	New Brunswick, New Jersey	Active	
University of Arkansas	September 4, 1929	Fayetteville, Arkansas	Active	
University of California, Los Angeles	September 4, 1929	Los Angeles, California	Active	
University of Chicago	September 4, 1929	Chicago, Illinois	Active	
University of Denver	September 4, 1929	Denver, Colorado	Active	
University of Kansas	September 4, 1929	Lawrence, Kansas	Active	
University of Nebraska–Lincoln	September 4, 1929	Lincoln, Nebraska	Active	
University of Southern California	September 4, 1929	Los Angeles, California	Active	
Washington State University	September 4, 1929	Pullman, Washington	Active	
Wittenberg University	September 4, 1929	Springfield, Ohio	Active	
University of Alabama	September 13, 1929	Tuscaloosa, Alabama	Active	
University of Georgia	December 6, 1929	Athens, Georgia	Active	
Nebraska Wesleyan University	January 1, 1930	Lincoln, Nebraska	Active	
Pennsylvania State University	January 1, 1930	University Park, Pennsylvania	Active	
University of Montana	January 1, 1930	Missoula, Montana	Active	
University of Pennsylvania	January 1, 1930	Philadelphia, Pennsylvania	Active	
University of Washington	January 1, 1930	Seattle, Washington	Inactive	
University of Wyoming	January 1, 1930	Laramie, Wyoming	Active	
Washington and Lee University	January 1, 1930	Lexington, Virginia	Inactive	
Southern Methodist University	December 29, 1930	Dallas, Texas	Active	
Syracuse University	May 2, 1932	Syracuse, New York	Active	
New York University	April 20, 1933	New York City, New York	Active	
New York University-University Heights	April 20, 1934	Bronx, New York	Inactive	(Note: The University Heights campus closed in 1973.)
University of Missouri	April 20, 1934	Columbia, Missouri	Active	
Tulane University	May 20, 1934	New Orleans, Louisiana	Active	
University of Oklahoma	March 21, 1936	Norman, Oklahoma	Active	
University of Minnesota	December 11, 1936	Minneapolis and Saint Paul, Minnesota	Active	
University of Illinois Urbana-Champaign	January 17, 1939	Champaign, Illinois	Active	
Arcadia University	May 12, 1939	Glenside, Pennsylvania	Active	
University of Utah	May 14, 1939	Salt Lake City, Utah	Active	
Morningside University	June 5, 1939	Sioux City, Iowa	Active	
Miami University	May 24, 1940	Oxford, Ohio	Active	
Douglass College	October 19, 1940	New Westminster and Coquitlam, British Columbia, Canada	Inactive	
Pittsburg State University	February 13, 1941	Pittsburg, Kansas	Inactive	
Kent State University	March 21, 1941	Kent, Ohio	Active	
University of California, Berkeley	April 16, 1941	Berkeley, California	Active	
Baylor University	April 18, 1942	Waco, Texas	Active	
University of Wisconsin–Madison	May 23, 1942	Madison, Wisconsin	Active	
Louisiana State University	May 11, 1945	Baton Rouge, Louisiana	Active	
University of Tulsa	January 11, 1946	Tulsa, Oklahoma	Active	
Denison University	June 9, 1946	Granville, Ohio	Active	
Howard University	June 2, 1947	Washington, D.C.	Active	
Bowling Green State University	June 9, 1947	Bowling Green, Ohio	Active	
Baruch College	August 26, 1947	Manhattan, New York City, New York	Active	
Occidental College	September 30, 1947	Los Angeles, California	Inactive	
Roosevelt University - Chicago Campus	December 14, 1947	Chicago, Illinois	Active	
New Mexico Highlands University	March 5, 1948	Las Vegas, New Mexico	Active	
Cornell University	May 4, 1948	Ithaca, New York	Active	
Utah State University	May 26, 1948	Logan, Utah	Active	
Indiana University Bloomington	May 28, 1948	Bloomington, Indiana	Active	
Temple University	May 28, 1948	Philadelphia, Pennsylvania	Active	
Marshall University	June 5, 1948	Huntington, West Virginia	Active	
Western Michigan University	June 9, 1948	Kalamazoo, Michigan	Active	
University of North Texas	July 13, 1948	Denton, Texas	Active	
Oklahoma State University–Stillwater	November 10, 1948	Stillwater, Oklahoma	Active	
University of Louisville	November 12, 1948	Louisville, Kentucky	Active	
West Virginia University	November 15, 1948	Morgantown, West Virginia	Active	
Wichita State University	December 14, 1948	Wichita, Kansas	Active	
San Jose State University	December 17, 1948	San Jose, California	Active	
University of New Hampshire	January 10, 1949	Durham, New Hampshire	Active	
George Washington University	February 18, 1949	Washington, D.C.	Active	
University of Pittsburgh	February 18, 1949	Pittsburgh, Pennsylvania	Active	
Louisiana Christian University	March 17, 1949	Pineville, Louisiana	Active	
University of Colorado Boulder	April 9, 1949	Boulder, Colorado	Active	
Gettysburg College	June 5, 1949	Gettysburg, Pennsylvania	Active	
Case Western Reserve University	December 9, 1949	Cleveland, Ohio	Active	
University of Miami	February 25, 1950	Coral Gables, Florida	Active	
University of Delaware	April 19, 1950	Newark, Delaware	Inactive	
Richmond American University London	April 22, 1950 – xxxx ?; January 26, 2018	London, England, United Kingdom	Active	
University of Texas at Austin	April 27, 1950	Austin, Texas	Active	
Castleton University	May 13, 1950	Castleton, Vermont	Active	
Colgate University	May 18, 1950	Hamilton, New York	Active	
University of Akron	May 20, 1950	Akron, Ohio	Active	
Bucknell University	May 23, 1950	Lewisburg, Pennsylvania	Active	
Duquesne University	May 23, 1950	Pittsburgh, Pennsylvania	Active	
Hunter College	May 24, 1950	Manhattan, New York City, New York	Active	
University of Nevada, Reno	May 25, 1950	Reno, Nevada	Active	
Tufts University	May 29, 1950	Medford and Somerville, Massachusetts	Active	
San Diego State University	June 21, 1950	San Diego, California	Active	
Adelphi University	November 17, 1950	Garden City, New York	Active	
Hofstra University	December 28, 1950	Hempstead, New York	Active	
Ohio State University	April 4, 1951	Columbus, Ohio	Active	
Wayne State University	April 21, 1951	Detroit, Michigan	Active	
Ohio Wesleyan University	May 15, 1951	Delaware, Ohio	Active	
Arizona State University	May 20, 1951	Tempe, Arizona	Active	
California State University, Fresno	May 23, 1951	Fresno, California	Active	
Queens College, City University of New York	May 24, 1951	Flushing, Queens, New York City, New York	Active	
Brooklyn College	June 1, 1951	Brooklyn, New York City, New York	Active	
Hartwick College	December 1, 1951	Oneonta, New York	Active	
Rhodes College	January 20, 1952	Memphis, Tennessee	Active	
University of North Carolina at Chapel Hill	January 22, 1952	Chapel Hill, North Carolina	Active	
Upsala College	May 13, 1952	East Orange, New Jersey	Inactive	(Note: College closed in 1995.)
Willamette University	May 14, 1952	Salem, Oregon	Inactive	
Pepperdine University Graduate School of Education and Psychology	May 18, 1952	West Los Angeles, California	Active	
Loyola University Chicago	October 25, 1952	Chicago, Illinois	Active	
University of South Carolina	November 20, 1952	Columbia, South Carolina	Active	
Boston University	April 10, 1953	Boston, Massachusetts	Active	
University of Oregon	June 12, 1953	Eugene, Oregon	Active	
Brigham Young University	February 23, 1954	Provo, Utah	Active	
University of Memphis	February 27, 1954	Memphis, Tennessee	Inactive	
DePauw University	April 7, 1954	Greencastle, Indiana	Active	
California State University, Long Beach	April 25, 1954	Long Beach, California	Active	
University of Mary Washington	May 20, 1954	Fredericksburg, Virginia	Active	
Yeshiva University	December 12, 1954	New York City, New York	Inactive	
St. Lawrence University	January 7, 1955	Canton, New York	Active	
University of Maryland, College Park	January 13, 1955	College Park, Maryland	Active	
University of Detroit Mercy McNichols Campus	February 27, 1955	Detroit, Michigan	Active	
University of Missouri–Kansas City	May 6, 1955	Kansas City, Missouri	Active	
Lehigh University	May 19, 1955	Bethlehem, Pennsylvania	Active	
Saint Louis University	May 23, 1955	St. Louis, Missouri	Active	
Stanford University	November 10, 1955	Stanford, California	Inactive	
Illinois Institute of Technology	December 9, 1955	Chicago, Illinois	Active	
California State University, Los Angeles	May 6, 1956	Los Angeles, California	Active	
Texas Christian University Psychology Department	September 28, 1956	Fort Worth, Texas	Active	
Baldwin Wallace University	November 9, 1956	Berea, Ohio	Active	
Stetson University	January 10, 1957	DeLand, Florida	Active	
University of Arizona	February 19, 1957	Tucson, Arizona	Active	
Johns Hopkins University	April 26, 1957	Baltimore, Maryland	Active	
University of Texas at El Paso	May 6, 1957	El Paso, Texas	Active	
Berea College	November 29, 1957	Berea, Kentucky	Active	
American University	March 28, 1958	Washington, D.C.	Active	
University of North Carolina at Greensboro	May 2, 1958	Greensboro, North Carolina	Active	
University of Houston	May 9, 1958	Houston, Texas	Active	
Morgan State University	May 23, 1958	Baltimore, Maryland	Active	
University of Wisconsin–Milwaukee	May 25, 1958	Milwaukee, Wisconsin	Inactive	
California State University, Sacramento	October 28, 1958	Sacramento, California	Active	
University of Minnesota Duluth	December 5, 1958	Duluth, Minnesota	Active	
Catholic University of America	December 10, 1958	Washington, D.C.	Active	
Hollins University	March 17, 1959	Hollins, Virginia	Active	
Duke University	April 15, 1959	Durham, North Carolina	Active	
Trinity College	April 16, 1959	Hartford, Connecticut	Active	
Florida State University	May 2, 1959	Tallahassee, Florida	Active	
University of Dayton	May 2, 1959	Dayton, Ohio	Active	
University of Redlands	May 4, 1959	Redlands, California	Active	
University of Cincinnati	May 13, 1959	Cincinnati, Ohio	Active	
University of Hawaiʻi at Mānoa	June 9, 1959	Mānoa, Honolulu, Hawaii	Active	
Muhlenberg College	December 9, 1959	Allentown, Pennsylvania	Active	
LIU Post	December 16, 1959	Brookville, New York	Active	
University of Louisiana at Lafayette	December 16, 1959	Lafayette, Louisiana	Active	
Texas Tech University	January 6, 1960	Lubbock, Texas	Active	
Marquette University	February 2, 1960	Milwaukee, Wisconsin	Active	
Lafayette College	March 23, 1960	Easton, Pennsylvania	Active	
Clark University	May 13, 1960	Worcester, Massachusetts	Inactive	
Alma College	May 19, 1960	Alma, Michigan	Active	
Georgia State University	May 28, 1960	Atlanta, Georgia	Active	
MacMurray College	June 1, 1960	Jacksonville, Illinois	Inactive	(Note: The college closed in May 2020.)
Lake Forest College	December 1, 1960	Lake Forest, Illinois	Active	
Virginia Commonwealth University	January 6, 1961	Richmond, Virginia	Active	
University of Kentucky	February 18, 1961	Lexington, Kentucky	Active	
City College of New York	February 22, 1961	New York City, New York	Active	
University of North Dakota	April 7, 1961	Grand Forks, North Dakota	Active	
University of Florida	May 13, 1961	Gainesville, Florida	Active	
Concordia College	May 20, 1961	Moorhead, Minnesota	Active	
Auburn University	May 21, 1961	Auburn, Alabama	Active	
College of William & Mary	May 21, 1961	Williamsburg, Virginia	Active	
LIU Brooklyn	May 21, 1961	Brooklyn, New York	Active	
North Carolina Central University	May 21, 1961	Durham, North Carolina	Active	
Southern University	May 26, 1961	Baton Rouge, Louisiana	Active	
Hampden–Sydney College	April 13, 1962	Hampden Sydney, Virginia	Inactive	
Whitworth University	April 30, 1962	Spokane County, Washington	Active	
Westminster College	May 1, 1962	New Wilmington, Pennsylvania	Active	
Central Washington University	May 13, 1962	Ellensburg, Washington	Active	
New Mexico State University	May 16, 1962	Las Cruces, New Mexico	Active	
West Virginia Wesleyan College	May 20, 1962	Buckhannon, West Virginia	Inactive	
Florida Southern College	May 22, 1962	Lakeland, Florida	Active	
Eastern Washington University	June 1, 1962	Cheney, Washington	Active	
University of New Orleans	June 7, 1962	New Orleans, Louisiana	Active	
Xavier University	September 28, 1962	Cincinnati, Ohio	Active	
University of Bridgeport	March 17, 1963	Bridgeport, Connecticut	Inactive	
Northern Illinois University	April 17, 1963	DeKalb, Illinois	Active	
Teachers College, Columbia University	April 19, 1963	New York City, New York	Active	
Fairleigh Dickinson University Rutherford Campus	May 4, 1963	Rutherford, New Jersey	Inactive	(Note: The Rutherford Campus programs merged with the Metropolitan Campus in 1993. The campus was sold to Felician College in 1997.)
Winthrop University	May 14, 1963	Rock Hill, South Carolina	Active	
University of Southern Mississippi	May 23, 1963	Hattiesburg, Mississippi	Active	
University of Wisconsin–Oshkosh	December 13, 1963	Oshkosh, Wisconsin	Active	
Benedictine College	January 14, 1964	Atchison, Kansas	Active	
St. John's University	February 6, 1964	Queens, New York	Active	
Albion College	February 11, 1964	Albion, Michigan	Active	
Lebanon Valley College	February 12, 1964	Annville Township, Pennsylvania	Active	
Alfred University	February 20, 1964	Alfred, New York	Active	
University of Tampa	February 25, 1964	Tampa, Florida	Active	
San Francisco State University	April 9, 1964	San Francisco, California	Active	
University of Evansville	May 13, 1964	Evansville, Indiana	Inactive	
University of Wisconsin–Eau Claire	May 13, 1964	Eau Claire, Wisconsin	Inactive	
Purdue University	May 14, 1964	West Lafayette, Indiana	Active	
Colorado State University	May 15, 1964	Fort Collins, Colorado	Active	
Emporia State University	May 17, 1964	Emporia, Kansas	Active	
California State University, Chico	May 23, 1964	Chico, California	Active	
La Salle University	June 1, 1964	Philadelphia, Pennsylvania	Active	
Monmouth University	June 2, 1964	West Long Branch, New Jersey	Active	
Emmanuel College	February 25, 1965	Boston, Massachusetts	Active	
College of the Holy Cross	March 30, 1965	Worcester, Massachusetts	Active	
Stephen F. Austin State University	April 14, 1965	Nacogdoches, Texas	Active	
Huntingdon College	April 25, 1965	Montgomery, Alabama	Active	
Carson–Newman University	May 10, 1965	Jefferson City, Tennessee	Active	
Virginia State University	May 13, 1965	Ettrick, Virginia	Active	
Murray State University	May 19, 1965	Murray, Kentucky	Active	
Springfield College	May 19, 1965	Springfield, Massachusetts	Active	
Rider University	May 24, 1965	Lawrence Township, New Jersey	Active	
Michigan State University	May 27, 1965	East Lansing, Michigan	Active	
Montana State University	June 4, 1965	Bozeman, Montana	Active	
Jacksonville University	October 1, 1965	Jacksonville, Florida	Active	
Hope College	October 27, 1965	Holland, Michigan	Active	
University of Nebraska Omaha	November 2, 1965	Omaha, Nebraska	Active	
John Carroll University	November 4, 1965	University Heights, Ohio	Active	
Elmhurst University	December 15, 1965	Elmhurst, Illinois	Active	
DePaul University	February 2, 1966	Chicago, Illinois	Active	
University of Toledo	May 4, 1966	Toledo, Ohio	Active	
Westmar University	May 20, 1966	Le Mars, Iowa	Inactive	(Note: University closed in November 1997.)
Trinity University	May 21, 1966	San Antonio, Texas	Inactive	
Edgecliff College	May 22, 1966	Cincinnati, Ohio	Inactive	(Note: The college merged with Xavier University in 1980.)
Wagner College	May 27, 1966	Staten Island, New York City, New York	Active	
Marywood University	May 28, 1966	Scranton, Pennsylvania	Active	
Towson University	June 22, 1966	Towson, Maryland	Active	
University at Albany, SUNY	December 6, 1966	Albany, New York	Active	
East Carolina University	December 8, 1966	Greenville, North Carolina	Active	
Parsons College	January 21, 1967	Fairfield, Iowa	Inactive	(Note: College closed in 1973.)
Eastern New Mexico University	February 18, 1967	Portales, New Mexico	Active	
University of Massachusetts Boston	March 22, 1967	Boston, Massachusetts	Active	
California State University, Northridge	April 7, 1967	Los Angeles, California	Active	
California State University, Fullerton	April 14, 1967	Fullerton, California	Active	
University of Central Missouri	April 27, 1967	Warrensburg, Missouri	Active	
State University of New York at Cortland	May 10, 1967	Cortland, New York	Active	
University of Missouri–St. Louis	May 12, 1967	St. Louis, Missouri	Active	
Wabash College	May 15, 1967	Crawfordsville, Indiana	Active	
Lake Erie College	May 18, 1967	Painesville, Ohio	Active	
Alliant International University	May 19, 1967	San Diego, California	Active	
Ursinus College	June 2, 1967	Collegeville, Pennsylvania	Active	
Fairleigh Dickinson University	July 7, 1967	Teaneck, New Jersey	Active	
Oklahoma City University	August 19, 1967	Oklahoma City, Oklahoma	Active	
Loyola University New Orleans	October 6, 1967	New Orleans, Louisiana	Active	
University of South Florida	October 19, 1967	Tampa, Florida	Active	
St. Bonaventure University	December 6, 1967	St. Bonaventure, New York	Active	
University of South Dakota	December 18, 1967	Vermillion, South Dakota	Active	
Central Connecticut State University	January 12, 1968	New Britain, Connecticut	Active	
University of Notre Dame	January 14, 1968	Notre Dame, Indiana	Active	
State University of New York at Plattsburgh	February 17, 1968	Plattsburgh, New York	Active	
Bellarmine University	April 21, 1968	Louisville, Kentucky	Active	
North Carolina State University	May 1, 1968	Raleigh, North Carolina	Active	
Susquehanna University	May 1, 1968	Selinsgrove, Pennsylvania	Active	
Iona University	May 6, 1968	New Rochelle, New York	Active	
Southern Illinois University Edwardsville	May 6, 1968	Edwardsville, Illinois	Active	
Fairleigh Dickinson University Madison Campus	May 13, 1968	Madison, New Jersey	Inactive	
Muskingum University	May 14, 1968	New Concord, Ohio	Active	
State University of New York at Oswego	May 16, 1968	Oswego, New York	Active	
Bradley University	May 20, 1968	Peoria, Illinois	Active	
Nasson College	May 20, 1968	Springvale, Maine	Inactive	
Rutgers University–Camden	May 23, 1968	Camden, New Jersey	Active	
Eastern Kentucky University	May 24, 1968	Richmond, Kentucky	Active	
Washburn University	May 28, 1968	Topeka, Kansas	Active	
Colorado State University Pueblo	May 29, 1968	Pueblo, Colorado	Active	
Holy Family University	June 1, 1968	Philadelphia, Pennsylvania	Active	
Northeastern Illinois University	July 30, 1968	Chicago, Illinois	Active	
Oklahoma Baptist University	September 27, 1968	Shawnee, Oklahoma	Active	
Wheeling University	September 28, 1968	Wheeling, West Virginia	Active	
Hamline University	October 9, 1968	Saint Paul, Minnesota	Active	
West Chester University	November 13, 1968	West Chester, Pennsylvania	Active	
Northwestern State University	January 8, 1969	Natchitoches, Louisiana	Active	
Rutgers University–Newark	January 27, 1969	Newark, New Jersey	Active	
University of Louisiana at Monroe	April 10, 1969	Monroe, Louisiana	Active	
St. Cloud State University	April 17, 1969	St. Cloud, Minnesota	Active	
Saint Mary's University of Minnesota	April 24, 1969 – xxxx ?; November 15, 2018	Winona, Minnesota	Active	
University of Hartford	April 25, 1969	West Hartford, Connecticut	Active	
Skidmore College	April 29, 1969	Saratoga Springs, New York	Active	
Lehman College	May 7, 1969	New York City, New York	Active	
Western Illinois University	May 7, 1969	Macomb, Illinois	Active	
Davis & Elkins College	May 14, 1969	Elkins, West Virginia	Inactive	
Eastern Illinois University	May 19, 1969	Charleston, Illinois	Active	
University of Scranton	May 30, 1969	Scranton, Pennsylvania	Active	
Seton Hall University	June 1, 1969	South Orange, New Jersey	Active	
Florida A&M University	June 4, 1969	Tallahassee, Florida	Active	
Augustana College	October 24, 1969	Rock Island, Illinois	Active	
Pace University	December 21, 1969	New York City, New York	Active	
Western Carolina University	March 13, 1970	Cullowhee, North Carolina	Active	
Fort Hays State University	April 24, 1970	Hays, Kansas	Active	
University of Nevada, Las Vegas	April 26, 1970	Paradise, Nevada	Active	
The Citadel	April 29, 1970	Charleston, South Carolina	Active	
Texas A&M University–Commerce	April 30, 1970	Commerce, Texas	Active	
State University of New York at Geneseo	May 3, 1970	Geneseo, New York	Active	
Texas Woman's University	May 11, 1970	Denton, Texas	Active	
Fordham School of Professional and Continuing Studies, Westchester Campus	May 14, 1970	Harrison, New York	Inactive	
Slippery Rock University	May 16, 1970	Slippery Rock, Pennsylvania	Active	
University of Jamestown	May 20, 1970	Jamestown, North Dakota	Active	
Bloomsburg University of Pennsylvania	May 21, 1970	Bloomsburg, Pennsylvania	Active	
Indiana University of Pennsylvania	May 24, 1970	Indiana, Pennsylvania	Active	
Kansas State University	May 24, 1970	Manhattan, Kansas	Active	
University of Central Arkansas	May 26, 1970	Conway, Arkansas	Active	
Central Michigan University	May 29, 1970	Mount Pleasant, Michigan	Active	
Missouri State University	May 29, 1970	Springfield, Missouri	Active	
University of West Florida	June 3, 1970	Pensacola, Florida	Active	
Texas A&M University	October 28, 1970	College Station, Texas	Active	
Ripon College	November 1, 1970	Ripon, Wisconsin	Active	
Regis College	April 27, 1971	Boston, Massachusetts	Active	
Montclair State University	May 9, 1971	Montclair, New Jersey	Active	
Furman University	May 18, 1971	Greenville, South Carolina	Active	
PennWest Edinboro	May 20, 1971	Edinboro, Pennsylvania	Active	
Lipscomb University	May 31, 1971	Nashville, Tennessee	Active	
Western Connecticut State University	June 4, 1971	Danbury, Connecticut	Active	
Elmira College	June 5, 1971	Elmira, New York	Active	
West Texas A&M University	October 8, 1971	Canyon, Texas	Inactive	
Tarkio College	October 10, 1971	Tarkio, Missouri	Inactive	(Note: The college closed in 1992.)
James Madison University	December 9, 1971	Harrisonburg, Virginia	Active	
Utica University	December 9, 1971	Utica, New York	Active	
University of South Florida St. Petersburg	February 2, 1972	St. Petersburg, Florida	Inactive	
Montana State University Billings	February 5, 1972	Billings, Montana	Active	
St. Mary's University, Texas	April 14, 1972	San Antonio, Texas	Active	
The Sage Colleges	May 11, 1972	New York	Inactive	
Carthage College	May 13, 1972	Kenosha, Wisconsin	Active	
University of Pittsburgh at Johnstown	May 13, 1972	Johnstown, Pennsylvania	Active	
St. Olaf College	May 14, 1972	Northfield, Minnesota	Active	
University of South Alabama	May 18, 1972	Mobile, Alabama	Active	
Monmouth College	May 25, 1972	Monmouth, Illinois	Active	
Stevens Institute of Technology	June 2, 1972	Hoboken, New Jersey	Inactive	
California State University, Dominguez Hills	July 14, 1972	Carson, California	Active	
Middle Tennessee State University	August 31, 1972	Murfreesboro, Tennessee	Active	
Old Dominion University	December 1, 1972	Norfolk, Virginia	Active	
Southern Connecticut State University	December 4, 1972	New Haven, Connecticut	Active	
Presbyterian College	December 5, 1972	Clinton, South Carolina	Active	
Loyola University Maryland	January 19, 1973	Baltimore, Maryland	Active	
University of Maryland, Baltimore County	February 21, 1973	Catonsville, Maryland	Active	
Georgetown University	February 23, 1973	Washington, D.C.	Active	
Thiel College	March 19, 1973	Greenville, Pennsylvania	Active	
University of Nebraska at Kearney	April 27, 1973	Kearney, Nebraska	Active	
Southeastern Louisiana University	May 4, 1973	Hammond, Louisiana	Active	
University of North Carolina at Asheville	May 4, 1973	Asheville, North Carolina	Active	
Sam Houston State University	May 5, 1973	Huntsville, Texas	Active	
Western Kentucky University	May 8, 1973	Bowling Green, Kentucky	Active	
Dillard University	May 10, 1973	New Orleans, Louisiana	Active	
Alverno College	May 14, 1973	Milwaukee, Wisconsin	Active	
Drexel University	May 14, 1973	Philadelphia, Pennsylvania	Active	
College of St. Benedict and St. John's University	May 15, 1973	St. Joseph and Collegeville, Minnesota	Active	
King's College	May 16, 1973	Wilkes-Barre, Pennsylvania	Active	
Tennessee State University	May 23, 1973	Nashville, Tennessee	Active	
Columbus State University	May 25, 1973	Columbus, Georgia	Active	
Molloy University	May 25, 1973	Rockville Centre, New York	Active	
University of San Francisco	June 7, 1973	San Francisco, California	Active	
Adrian College	November 28, 1973	Adrian, Michigan	Active	
Mansfield University of Pennsylvania	December 6, 1973	Mansfield, Pennsylvania	Active	
George Mason University	February 8, 1974	Fairfax, Virginia	Active	
North Dakota State University	February 12, 1974	Fargo, North Dakota	Inactive	
Saint Joseph's University	April 10, 1974	Lower Merion Township, Pennsylvania	Active	
Birmingham–Southern College	April 11, 1974	Birmingham, Alabama	Active	
Metropolitan State University of Denver	April 18, 1974	Denver, Colorado	Active	
Salisbury University	April 29, 1974	Salisbury, Maryland	Active	
Spelman College	May 2, 1974	Atlanta, Georgia	Active	
Kean University	May 3, 1974	Union Township, New Jersey	Active	
North Central College	May 4, 1974	Naperville, Illinois	Active	
Canisius University	May 6, 1974	Buffalo, New York	Active	
Western New England University	May 8, 1974	Springfield, Massachusetts	Active	
Catawba College	May 9, 1974	Salisbury, North Carolina	Active	
Midwestern State University	May 12, 1974	Wichita Falls, Texas	Active	
McDaniel College	May 15, 1974	Westminster, Maryland	Active	
Hood College	May 16, 1974	Frederick, Maryland	Active	
Weber State University	May 22, 1974	Ogden, Utah	Active	
Bowie State University	May 23, 1974	Prince George's County, Maryland	Active	
Mundelein College	May 29, 1974	Chicago, Illinois	Inactive	(Note: The college merged with Loyola University Chicago in 1991.)
John Jay College of Criminal Justice	May 30, 1974	New York City, New York	Active	
West Virginia State University	June 2, 1974	Institute, West Virginia	Active	
State University of New York at Fredonia	October 23, 1974	Fredonia, New York	Active	
Barry University	November 2, 1974	Miami Shores, Florida	Active	
University of Tennessee at Martin	December 9, 1974	Martin, Tennessee	Active	
Notre Dame of Maryland University	December 10, 1974	Baltimore, Maryland	Inactive	
New York Institute of Technology	December 19, 1974	Old Westbury, New York	Active	
Manhattan College	January 30, 1975	Bronx, New York City, New York	Active	
Southwestern University	April 18, 1975	Georgetown, Texas	Active	
University of Michigan–Flint	April 18, 1975	Flint, Michigan	Active	
Texas Lutheran University	April 22, 1975	Seguin, Texas	Active	
Clemson University	April 24, 1975	Clemson, South Carolina	Active	
Dickinson College	April 24, 1975	Carlisle, Pennsylvania	Active	
State University of New York Brockport	April 25, 1975	Brockport, New York	Active	
PennWest Clarion	May 6, 1975	Clarion, Pennsylvania	Active	
Illinois Wesleyan University	May 8, 1975	Bloomington, Illinois	Active	
Norfolk State University	May 8, 1975	Norfolk, Virginia	Active	
Mary Baldwin University	May 9, 1975	Staunton, Virginia	Active	
Meredith College	May 9, 1975	Raleigh, North Carolina	Active	
University of Baltimore	May 12, 1975	Baltimore, Maryland	Active	
University of San Diego	May 12, 1975	San Diego, California	Active	
Carnegie Mellon University	May 13, 1975	Pittsburgh, Pennsylvania	Active	
York College, City University of New York	May 14, 1975	Jamaica, Queens, New York City, New York	Inactive	
Houston Christian University	May 15, 1975	Houston, Texas	Active	
University of Colorado Colorado Springs	May 18, 1975	Colorado Springs, Colorado	Active	
Avila University	May 24, 1975	Kansas City, Missouri	Active	
Florida International University	June 4, 1975	Miami, Florida	Active	
Indiana University South Bend	September 12, 1975	South Bend, Indiana	Active	
Hampton University	November 11, 1975	Hampton, Virginia	Active	
Smith College	November 13, 1975	Northampton, Massachusetts	Inactive	
College of New Rochelle	November 14, 1975	New Rochelle, New York	Inactive	(Note: College closed in 2019.)
Waynesburg University	January 26, 1976	Waynesburg, Pennsylvania	Active	
University of Tennessee at Chattanooga	February 6, 1976	Chattanooga, Tennessee	Inactive	
Troy University	February 26, 1976	Troy, Alabama	Active	
University of New Haven	March 22, 1976	West Haven, Connecticut	Active	
California State University, San Bernardino	April 2, 1976	San Bernardino, California	Active	
Frostburg State University	April 4, 1976	Frostburg, Maryland	Active	
Lycoming College	April 12, 1976	Williamsport, Pennsylvania	Active	
Truman State University	April 15, 1976	Kirksville, Missouri	Active	
Louisiana Tech University	April 21, 1976	Ruston, Louisiana	Active	
Whittier College	April 22, 1976	Whittier, California	Active	
Shippensburg University of Pennsylvania	April 23, 1976	Shippensburg, Pennsylvania	Active	
Northern Arizona University	May 5, 1976	Flagstaff, Arizona	Active	
Moravian University	May 11, 1976	Bethlehem, Pennsylvania	Active	
William Paterson University	May 11, 1976	Wayne, New Jersey	Active	
Emory University	May 23, 1976	Atlanta, Georgia	Active	
St. Francis College	May 28, 1976	Downtown Brooklyn, New York City, New York	Active	
Mount St. Mary's University	November 1, 1976	Emmitsburg, Maryland	Active	
Austin College	November 5, 1976	Sherman, Texas	Active	
Harding University	November 11, 1976	Searcy, Arkansas	Active	
University of Central Oklahoma	November 30, 1976	Edmond, Oklahoma	Active	
Ball State University	January 28, 1977	Muncie, Indiana	Active	
Pepperdine University	January 29, 1977	Malibu, California	Active	
East Tennessee State University	March 3, 1977	Johnson City, Tennessee	Active	
Dowling College	March 30, 1977	Oakdale, New York	Inactive	(Note: College closed in 2016.)
Westfield State University	April 21, 1977	Westfield, Massachusetts	Active	
Franklin & Marshall College	April 27, 1977	Lancaster, Pennsylvania	Active	
Saint Mary's College	April 27, 1977	Notre Dame, Indiana	Active	
Virginia Tech	April 28, 1977	Blacksburg, Virginia	Active	
University of St. Thomas	April 29, 1977	Houston, Texas	Active	
Elizabethtown College	May 3, 1977	Elizabethtown, Pennsylvania	Active	
University of Wisconsin–Stevens Point	May 3, 1977	Stevens Point, Wisconsin	Active	
Cheyney University of Pennsylvania	May 4, 1977	Cheyney, Pennsylvania	Active	
Fairfield University	May 4, 1977	Fairfield, Connecticut	Active	
Hamilton College	May 4, 1977	Clifton, New York	Active	
Immaculata University	May 5, 1977	East Whiteland Township, Pennsylvania	Active	
Clark Atlanta University	May 9, 1977	Atlanta, Georgia	Active	
Capital University	May 14, 1977	Bexley, Ohio	Active	
University of Alabama in Huntsville	May 14, 1977	Huntsville, Alabama	Active	
Hillsdale College	May 17, 1977	Hillsdale, Michigan	Active	
Hanover College	May 25, 1977	Hanover, Indiana	Inactive	
Georgian Court University	April 9, 1978	Lakewood Township, New Jersey	Active	
University of North Carolina at Pembroke	April 19, 1978	Pembroke, North Carolina	Active	
Andrews University	April 26, 1978	Berrien Springs, Michigan	Active	
Suffolk University	April 28, 1978	Boston, Massachusetts	Active	
East Central University	May 2, 1978	Ada, Oklahoma	Active	
Indiana University Northwest	May 7, 1978	Gary, Indiana	Active	
Southeast Missouri State University	May 8, 1978	Cape Girardeau, Missouri	Active	
University of Idaho	May 13, 1978	Moscow, Idaho	Active	
American International College	May 14, 1978	Springfield, Massachusetts	Active	
Drury University	May 18, 1978	Springfield, Missouri	Active	
Spring Arbor University	May 18, 1978	Spring Arbor, Michigan	Active	
College of Staten Island	May 19, 1978	Staten Island, New York	Active	
University of Tennessee	June 2, 1978	Knoxville, Tennessee	Active	
Francis Marion University	June 29, 1978	Florence, South Carolina	Active	
University of Texas Permian Basin	July 17, 1978	Odessa, Texas	Active	
Mercy University	September 1, 1978	Dobbs Ferry, New York	Active	
Roger Williams University	September 29, 1978	Bristol, Rhode Island	Active	
Eastern Michigan University	December 7, 1978	Ypsilanti, Michigan	Active	
Villanova University	December 13, 1978	Villanova, Pennsylvania	Active	
St. Catherine University	February 6, 1979	Saint Paul, Minnesota	Active	
Cardinal Stritch University	February 10, 1979	Fox Point and Glendale, Wisconsin	Active	
University of Virginia	February 12, 1979	Charlottesville, Virginia	Inactive	
Arkansas State University	February 27, 1979	Jonesboro, Arkansas	Active	
University of Olivet	February 27, 1979	Olivet, Michigan	Active	
Marymount Manhattan College	February 28, 1979	Manhattan, New York City, New York	Active	
Marist College	March 2, 1979	Poughkeepsie, New York	Active	
Radford University	March 16, 1979	Radford, Virginia	Active	
State University of New York College at Oneonta	March 29, 1979	Oneonta, New York	Active	
Trinity International University	April 2, 1979	Omaha, Nebraska	Active	
College of Charleston	April 10, 1979	Charleston, South Carolina	Active	
Saint Joseph's College	April 10, 1979	Rensselaer, Indiana	Inactive	
Missouri University of Science and Technology	April 20, 1979	Rolla, Missouri	Active	
Creighton University	April 22, 1979	Omaha, Nebraska	Active	
South Dakota State University	April 23, 1979	Brookings, South Dakota	Active	
Morehead State University	April 24, 1979	Morehead, Kentucky	Active	
Siena College	April 24, 1979	Loudonville, New York	Active	
Benedictine University	April 26, 1979	Chicago, Illinois	Active	
Nazareth University	April 27, 1979	Pittsford, New York	Active	
Ohio Dominican University	May 1, 1979	Columbus, Ohio	Active	
Virginia Wesleyan University	May 1, 1979	Virginia Beach, Virginia	Active	
Stockton University	May 3, 1979	Galloway Township, New Jersey	Active	
University of Massachusetts Amherst	May 3, 1979	Amherst, Massachusetts	Active	
University of Alaska Fairbanks	May 5, 1979	College, Alaska	Active	
New Jersey City University	May 7, 1979	Jersey City, New Jersey	Active	
Transylvania University	May 8, 1979	Lexington, Kentucky	Active	
Loyola Marymount University	May 9, 1979	Los Angeles, California	Active	
Claremont McKenna College	May 10, 1979	Claremont, California	Active	
Union College	May 22, 1979	Schenectady, New York	Active	
Tennessee Tech	June 1, 1979	Cookeville, Tennessee	Active	
University of California, Santa Barbara	June 6, 1979	Santa Barbara, California	Active	
Texas Wesleyan University	July 7, 1979	Fort Worth, Texas	Active	
South Carolina State University	October 26, 1979	Orangeburg, South Carolina	Active	
Nicholls State University	November 8, 1979	Thibodaux, Louisiana	Active	
Buffalo State University	November 16, 1979	Buffalo, New York	Active	
North Carolina A&T State University	November 18, 1979	Greensboro, North Carolina	Active	
Manhattanville College	November 28, 1979	Purchase, New York	Active	
University of Michigan–Dearborn	January 12, 1980	Dearborn, Michigan	Active	
University of Wisconsin–Whitewater	March 16, 1980	Whitewater, Wisconsin	Active	
St. Norbert College	March 25, 1980	De Pere, Wisconsin	Active	
Wesleyan College	April 14, 1980	Macon, Georgia	Active	
Dominican University of California	April 15, 1980	San Rafael, California	Active	
Drew University	April 20, 1980	Madison, New Jersey	Active	
Indiana State University	April 20, 1980	Terre Haute, Indiana	Active	
Jackson State University	April 22, 1980	Jackson, Mississippi	Active	
Dominican University	April 30, 1980	River Forest, Illinois	Active	
Roanoke College	May 4, 1980	Salem, Virginia	Active	
East Stroudsburg University of Pennsylvania	May 7, 1980	East Stroudsburg, Pennsylvania	Active	
Mount Holyoke College	May 8, 1980	South Hadley, Massachusetts	Inactive	
Carroll University	May 11, 1980	Waukesha, Wisconsin	Active	
Salem State University	June 6, 1980	Salem, Massachusetts	Active	
Youngstown State University	June 6, 1980	Youngstown, Ohio	Active	
Missouri Southern State University	June 18, 1980	Joplin, Missouri	Active	
Bethany College	September 14, 1980	Lindsborg, Kansas	Inactive	
University of Alaska Anchorage	October 25, 1980	Anchorage, Alaska	Active	
Fordham University at Rose Hill	October 29, 1980	The Bronx, New York City, New York	Active	
St. Ambrose University	November 10, 1980	Davenport, Iowa	Active	
Western Oregon University	November 19, 1980	Monmouth, Oregon	Active	
University of Texas at Arlington	January 22, 1981	Arlington, Texas	Active	
Aquinas College	January 25, 1981	Grand Rapids, Michigan	Active	
Colby College	March 5, 1981	Waterville, Maine	Active	
Westminster College	March 19, 1981	Fulton, Missouri	Active	
William Woods University	March 19, 1981	Fulton, Missouri	Active	
Lewis University	March 25, 1981	Romeoville, Illinois	Active	
Vanderbilt University	March 31, 1981	Nashville, Tennessee	Active	
Worcester State University	April 2, 1981	Worcester, Massachusetts	Active	
Chestnut Hill College	April 9, 1981	Chestnut Hill, Philadelphia, Pennsylvania	Active	
Northern Kentucky University	April 10, 1981	Highland Heights, Kentucky	Active	
Fisk University	April 16, 1981	Nashville, Tennessee	Inactive	
Bethune–Cookman University	April 24, 1981	Daytona Beach, Florida	Active	
University of North Carolina Wilmington	May 1, 1981	Wilmington, North Carolina	Active	
Biola University	May 22, 1981	La Mirada, California	Active	
Georgia Southern University	June 3, 1981	Statesboro, Georgia	Active	
Florida Institute of Technology	July 1, 1981	Melbourne, Florida	Active	
University of Detroit Mercy	September 28, 1981	Detroit, Michigan	Active	
Wilkes University	October 8, 1981	Wilkes-Barre, Pennsylvania	Active	
Marymount University	October 24, 1981	Arlington County, Virginia	Active	
University of New Mexico	November 3, 1981	Albuquerque, New Mexico	Active	
University of Montevallo	November 8, 1981	Montevallo, Alabama	Active	
Washington & Jefferson College	November 11, 1981	Washington, Pennsylvania	Active	
Delaware State University	December 7, 1981	Dover, Delaware	Active	
Pacific Union College	December 8, 1981	Angwin, California	Active	
Indiana University Indianapolis	December 9, 1981	Indianapolis, Indiana	Active	
Marietta College	December 10, 1981	Marietta, Ohio	Active	
University of Central Florida	December 11, 1981	Orlando, Florida	Active	
Gannon University	January 29, 1982	Erie, Pennsylvania	Inactive	
University of Southern Maine	January 29, 1982	Portland, Maine	Active	
California State Polytechnic University, Pomona	February 12, 1982	Pomona, California	Active	
Beloit College	February 25, 1982	Beloit, Wisconsin	Active	
University of Mount Saint Vincent	March 23, 1982	New York City, New York	Active	
Binghamton University	April 19, 1982	Binghamton, New York	Active	
Pfeiffer University	April 19, 1982	Misenheimer, North Carolina	Inactive	
Lincoln University	April 22, 1982		Inactive	
Appalachian State University	April 27, 1982	Boone, North Carolina	Active	
Stephens College	April 28, 1982	Columbia, Missouri	Active	
Northwest Missouri State University	May 7, 1982	Maryville, Missouri	Active	
Washington College	May 16, 1982	Chestertown, Maryland	Active	
University of North Georgia Gainesville Campus	May 18, 1982	Oakwood, Georgia	Active	
Central State University	May 20, 1982	Wilberforce, Ohio	Active	
Eastern Oregon University	May 22, 1982	La Grande, Oregon	Active	
Southern Oregon University	August 15, 1982	Ashland, Oregon	Active	
University of Michigan	October 29, 1982	Ann Arbor, Michigan	Active	
Texas State University	November 9, 1982	San Marcos, Texas	Active	
Eastern Connecticut State University	November 17, 1982	Willimantic, Connecticut	Active	
Kennesaw State University	November 17, 1982	Cobb County, Georgia	Active	
University of California, Davis	November 22, 1982	Davis, California	Active	
University of Northern Colorado	November 22, 1982	Greeley, Colorado	Active	
Hastings College	December 1, 1982	Hastings, Nebraska	Active	
Northeastern State University	December 10, 1982	Tahlequah, Oklahoma	Active	
Seton Hill University	February 15, 1983	Greensburg, Pennsylvania	Active	
State University of New York at Buffalo	March 11, 1983	Buffalo, New York	Active	
University of Texas Rio Grande Valley	March 26, 1983	Edinburg, Texas	Active	
University of Mobile	March 27, 1983	Mobile, Alabama	Active	
Linfield University	March 31, 1983	McMinnville, Oregon	Active	
Methodist University	April 22, 1983	Fayetteville, North Carolina	Active	
Niagara University	April 29, 1983	Lewiston, New York	Active	
University of Northern Iowa	May 1, 1983	Cedar Falls, Iowa	Active	
Stonehill College	May 4, 1983	Easton, Massachusetts	Active	
Fitchburg State University	May 5, 1983	Fitchburg, Massachusetts	Active	
North Carolina Wesleyan University	May 7, 1983	Rocky Mount, North Carolina	Active	
Western Washington University	May 20, 1983	Bellingham, Washington	Active	
Augusta University	June 3, 1983	Augusta, Georgia	Active	
Texas A&M University–Texarkana	June 23, 1983	Texarkana, Texas	Inactive	
St. Thomas University	September 30, 1983	Miami Gardens, Florida	Inactive	
University of Connecticut	October 5, 1983	Storrs, Connecticut	Active	
Marian University	October 30, 1983	Indianapolis, Indiana	Active	
Cabrini University	November 9, 1983	Radnor Township, Pennsylvania	Active	
Fordham University at Lincoln Center	December 9, 1983	New York City, New York	Active	
Lock Haven University of Pennsylvania	December 16, 1983	Lock Haven, Pennsylvania	Active	
Saginaw Valley State University	February 12, 1984	University Center, Michigan	Active	
Spalding University	February 12, 1984	Louisville, Kentucky	Active	
University of Rhode Island	February 15, 1984	Kingston, Rhode Island	Active	
University of Colorado Denver	February 24, 1984	Denver, Colorado	Active	
Washington University in St. Louis	February 29, 1984	St. Louis, Missouri	Active	
California State Polytechnic University, Humboldt	March 9, 1984	Arcata, California	Active	
University of Mississippi	March 20, 1984	Oxford, Mississippi	Active	
Bloomfield College	April 6, 1984	Bloomfield, New Jersey	Active	
University of Southern Indiana	April 12, 1984	Evansville, Indiana	Active	
Heidelberg University	April 26, 1984	Tiffin, Ohio	Active	
University of Maine at Farmington	April 29, 1984	Farmington, Maine	Active	
University of Wisconsin–La Crosse	April 30, 1984	La Crosse, Wisconsin	Active	
Eastern University	May 3, 1984	St. Davids, Pennsylvania	Active	
SUNY Polytechnic Institute	May 13, 1984	Albany, New York	Active	
University of Minnesota Morris	May 23, 1984	Morris, Minnesota.	Active	
Cleveland State University	June 11, 1984	Cleveland, Ohio	Active	
Minnesota State University Moorhead	July 16, 1984	Moorhead, Minnesota	Active	
Oakland University	October 30, 1984	Oakland County, Michigan	Active	
Morehouse College	November 1, 1984	Atlanta, Georgia	Active	
Plymouth State University	November 1, 1984	Plymouth, New Hampshire	Active	
California State University, Stanislaus	November 16, 1984	Turlock, California	Active	
Mount Saint Mary's University, Los Angeles	November 17, 1984	Los Angeles, California	Inactive	
Illinois State University	November 28, 1984	Normal, Illinois	Active	
Xavier University of Louisiana	March 15, 1985	New Orleans, Louisiana	Active	
Wheaton College	March 21, 1985	Wheaton, Illinois	Active	
Merrimack College	April 17, 1985	North Andover, Massachusetts	Active	
University of Iowa	April 25, 1985	Iowa City, Iowa	Active	
University of North Florida	April 26, 1985	Jacksonville, Florida	Active	
University of Puget Sound	April 27, 1985	Tacoma, Washington	Inactive	
Oglethorpe University	May 8, 1985	Brookhaven, Georgia	Active	
University of Texas at Dallas	May 9, 1985	Richardson, Texas	Active	
Webster University	May 9, 1985	Webster Groves, Missouri	Active	
Saint Peter's University	May 10, 1985	Jersey City, New Jersey	Active	
Seattle University	May 28, 1985	Seattle, Washington	Active	
Athens State University	May 30, 1985	Athens, Alabama	Active	
University of Texas at San Antonio	October 16, 1985	San Antonio, Texas	Active	
Albizu University Miami Campus	October 18, 1985	Miami, Florida	Active	
North Park University	November 6, 1985	Chicago, Illinois	Active	
University of Houston–Clear Lake	November 16, 1985	Houston and Pasadena, Texas	Active	
Saint Xavier University	November 17, 1985	Chicago, Illinois	Active	
Argosy University Schaumburg Campus	November 22, 1985	Schaumburg, Illinois	Inactive	(Note: Argosy University closed all locations in 2019.)
Auburn University at Montgomery	January 19, 1986	Montgomery, Alabama	Active	
University of Illinois Chicago	February 21, 1986	Chicago, Illinois	Active	
MidAmerica Nazarene University	March 11, 1986	Olathe, Kansas	Inactive	
Lamar University	April 23, 1986	Beaumont, Texas	Active	
Lander University	April 23, 1986	Greenwood, South Carolina	Active	
Berry College	May 8, 1986	Mount Berry, Georgia	Active	
University of Maine	May 15, 1986	Orono, Maine	Active	
University of Wisconsin–Parkside	June 3, 1986	Kenosha, Wisconsin	Active	
Lewis & Clark College	June 4, 1986	Portland, Oregon	Active	
Quinnipiac University	September 18, 1986	Hamden, Connecticut	Active	
Bridgewater State University	November 23, 1986	Bridgewater, Massachusetts	Active	
Christian Brothers University	January 30, 1987	Memphis, Tennessee	Active	
Wake Forest University	February 25, 1987	Winston-Salem, North Carolina	Active	
University of Wisconsin–Platteville	February 26, 1987	Platteville, Wisconsin	Active	
University of California, Riverside	February 28, 1987	Riverside, California	Active	
Doane University	March 4, 1987	Crete, Nebraska	Active	
Sacred Heart University	April 5, 1987	Fairfield, Connecticut	Active	
DeSales University	April 29, 1987	Center Valley, Pennsylvania	Active	
University of Wisconsin–River Falls	April 29, 1987	River Falls, Wisconsin	Active	
Gardner–Webb University	May 4, 1987	Boiling Springs, North Carolina	Active	
Wheaton College	May 4, 1987	Norton, Massachusetts	Active	
Southwest Minnesota State University	May 14, 1987	Marshall, Minnesota	Active	
Pacific Lutheran University	May 15, 1987	Parkland, Washington	Active	
Williams College	May 25, 1987	Williamstown, Massachusetts	Inactive	
Briar Cliff University	July 18, 1987	Sioux City, Iowa	Active	
St. Mary's College of Maryland	September 15, 1987	St. Mary's City, Maryland	Active	
Johnson C. Smith University	October 22, 1987	Charlotte, North Carolina	Active	
Connecticut College	March 8, 1988	New London, Connecticut	Active	
Colorado Mesa University	April 4, 1988	Grand Junction, Colorado	Active	
High Point University	April 9, 1988	High Point, North Carolina	Active	
University of Texas at Tyler	April 11, 1988	Tyler, Texas	Active	
Covenant College	April 15, 1988	Lookout Mountain, Georgia	Active	
State University of New York at Stony Brook	April 15, 1988	Stony Brook, New York	Active	
University of Charleston	April 18, 1988	Charleston, West Virginia	Active	
Thomas More University	April 20, 1988	Crestview Hills, Kentucky	Active	
Liberty University	April 21, 1988	Lynchburg, Virginia	Active	
Gustavus Adolphus College	April 25, 1988	St. Peter, Minnesota	Active	
University of North Alabama	April 25, 1988	Florence, Alabama	Active	
Longwood University	April 26, 1988	Farmville, Virginia	Active	
Stony Brook Southampton	May 9, 1988	Southampton, New York	Inactive	
Neumann University	May 9, 1988	Aston Township, Pennsylvania	Active	
Chapman University	May 19, 1988	Orange, California	Active	
Sonoma State University	May 27, 1988	Rohnert Park, California	Active	
University of California, Irvine	June 10, 1988	Irvine, California	Active	
Conception Seminary College	September 5, 1988	Conception, Missouri	Inactive	
Pomona College	November 28, 1988	Claremont, California	Inactive	
Georgetown College	February 2, 1989	Georgetown, Kentucky	Active	
Franciscan University of Steubenville	March 15, 1989	Steubenville, Ohio	Active	
Christopher Newport University	March 30, 1989	Newport News, Virginia	Active	
Washington Adventist University	April 19, 1989	Takoma Park, Maryland	Active	
Northern State University	April 28, 1989	Aberdeen, South Dakota	Inactive	
University of Lynchburg	April 28, 1989	Lynchburg, Virginia	Active	
William Jewell College	April 28, 1989	Liberty, Missouri	Active	
Millersville University of Pennsylvania	May 4, 1989	Millersville, Pennsylvania	Active	
California University of Pennsylvania	May 6, 1989	California, Pennsylvania	Active	
Regis University	May 7, 1989	Denver, Colorado	Active	
Carroll College	May 12, 1989	Helena, Montana	Active	
Keene State College	May 12, 1989	Keene, New Hampshire	Active	
Eastern Nazarene College	May 18, 1989	Quincy, Massachusetts	Active	
Georgia Southwestern State University	October 13, 1989	Americus, Georgia	Active	
University of California, Santa Cruz	October 18, 1989	Santa Cruz, California	Active	
Idaho State University	October 27, 1989	Pocatello, Idaho	Active	
Missouri Western State University	October 27, 1989	St. Joseph, Missouri	Active	
Holy Names University	November 7, 1989	Oakland, California	Inactive	
Texas A&M University–Corpus Christi	November 17, 1989	Corpus Christi, Texas	Active	
Texas A&M University–Victoria	November 19, 1989	Victoria, Texas	Active	
Indiana University Southeast	December 1, 1989	New Albany, Indiana	Active	
Allegheny College	January 12, 1990	Meadville, Pennsylvania	Active	
University of Illinois Springfield	February 17, 1990	Springfield, Illinois	Active	
Southern Utah University	March 8, 1990	Cedar City, Utah	Active	
Coastal Carolina University	March 22, 1990	Conway, South Carolina	Active	
University of Massachusetts Lowell	March 29, 1990	Lowell, Massachusetts	Active	
University of North Carolina at Charlotte	April 10, 1990	Charlotte, North Carolina	Active	
Agnes Scott College	April 16, 1990	Decatur, Georgia	Active	
Austin Peay State University	April 16, 1990	Clarksville, Tennessee	Active	
Point Park University	April 18, 1990	Pittsburgh, Pennsylvania	Inactive	
Rice University	April 23, 1990	Houston, Texas	Active	
University of La Verne	April 25, 1990	La Verne, California	Active	
Brandeis University	April 26, 1990	Waltham, Massachusetts	Active	
Spring Hill College	April 29, 1990	Mobile, Alabama	Active	
Pitzer College	May 2, 1990	Claremont, California	Active	
Saint Anselm College	May 2, 1990	Goffstown, New Hampshire	Active	
Mississippi College	May 3, 1990	Clinton, Mississippi	Active	
Randolph–Macon College	May 7, 1990	Ashland, Virginia	Active	
Trinity College of Vermont	May 10, 1990	Burlington, Vermont	Inactive	(Note: The college closed in 2000.)
Luther College	May 16, 1990	Decorah, Iowa	Active	
Albright College	May 18, 1990	Reading, Pennsylvania	Active	
Cedar Crest College	September 12, 1990	Allentown, Pennsylvania	Active	
Grand Valley State University	September 12, 1990	Allendale, Michigan	Active	
Le Moyne College	October 23, 1990	DeWitt, New York	Active	
Macalester College	November 8, 1990	Saint Paul, Minnesota	Active	
Valparaiso University	November 30, 1990	Valparaiso, Indiana	Active	
Otterbein University	February 6, 1991	Westerville, Ohio	Active	
Penn State Erie, The Behrend College	February 24, 1991	Erie, Pennsylvania	Active	
Southern Arkansas University	March 11, 1991	Magnolia, Arkansas	Active	
Mississippi State University	April 6, 1991	Starkville, Mississippi	Active	
Geneva College	April 11, 1991	Beaver Falls, Pennsylvania	Active	
University of Pittsburgh at Bradford	April 16, 1991	Bradford, Pennsylvania	Active	
Rowan University	April 19, 1991	Glassboro, New Jersey	Active	
Winston-Salem State University	April 24, 1991	Winston-Salem, North Carolina	Active	
Southern Illinois University Carbondale	April 25, 1991	Carbondale, Illinois	Active	
University of Mount Olive	April 27, 1991	Mount Olive, North Carolina	Active	
Central College	April 29, 1991	Pella, Iowa	Active	
Chatham University	May 6, 1991	Pittsburgh, Pennsylvania	Active	
Goucher College	May 6, 1991	Towson, Maryland	Active	
Maryville College	May 6, 1991	Maryville, Tennessee	Active	
Caldwell University	May 8, 1991	Caldwell, New Jersey	Active	
Pace University Pleasantville Campus	May 10, 1991	Pleasantville, New York	Active	
Forest Institute	May 11, 1991	Springfield, Missouri	Inactive	(Note: The school closed in 2015.)
St. John's University Staten Island Campus	May 14, 1991	Staten Island, New York City, New York	Active	
Winona State University	May 18, 1991	Winona, Minnesota	Inactive	
Santa Clara University	June 6, 1991	Santa Clara, California	Active	
California State University, Bakersfield	June 15, 1991	Bakersfield, California	Active	
Providence College	June 30, 1991	Providence, Rhode Island	Active	
Juniata College	October 3, 1991	Huntingdon, Pennsylvania	Active	
Belmont University	October 14, 1991	Nashville, Tennessee	Active	
Mercyhurst University	October 16, 1991	Erie, Pennsylvania	Active	
Bethany College	December 4, 1991	Bethany, West Virginia	Active	
Defiance College	December 10, 1991	Defiance, Ohio	Inactive	
California Lutheran University	February 2, 1992	Thousand Oaks, California	Active	
Ouachita Baptist University	March 12, 1992	Arkadelphia, Arkansas	Active	
Colorado College	March 26, 1992	Colorado Springs, Colorado	Active	
Angelo State University	March 27, 1992	San Angelo, Texas	Active	
Boise State University	April 22, 1992	Boise, Idaho	Active	
Piedmont University	April 22, 1992	Demorest, Georgia	Active	
Alabama Agricultural and Mechanical University	April 28, 1992	Normal, Alabama	Active	
Augsburg University	April 28, 1992	Minneapolis, Minnesota	Active	
Lee University	April 29, 1992	Cleveland, Tennessee	Active	
State University of New York at Potsdam	April 29, 1992	Potsdam, New York	Active	
Ithaca College	May 2, 1992	Ithaca, New York	Active	
Concord University	May 5, 1992	Athens, West Virginia	Active	
Tuskegee University	May 6, 1992	Tuskegee, Alabama	Active	
California State University, East Bay	May 8, 1992	Hayward, California	Active	
Elon University	May 12, 1992	Elon, North Carolina	Active	
La Roche University	May 13, 1992	McCandless, Pennsylvania	Active	
Castleton University	May 14, 1992	Castleton, Vermont	Active	
Lawrence University	May 18, 1992	Appleton, Wisconsin	Active	
Adler University	June 16, 1992	Chicago, Illinois	Active	
National University	June 30, 1992	San Diego, California	Active	
Gonzaga University	September 10, 1992	Spokane, Washington	Active	
University of Saint Joseph	September 27, 1992	West Hartford, Connecticut	Active	
Saint Elizabeth University	September 28, 1992	Morris County, New Jersey	Active	
Wright State University	October 1, 1992	Fairborn, Ohio	Active	
Baker University	October 3, 1992	Baldwin City, Kansas	Active	
Phillips University	October 23, 1992	Enid, Oklahoma	Inactive	(Note: University closed in 1998.)
Knox College	October 28, 1992	Galesburg, Illinois	Active	
Kutztown University of Pennsylvania	October 28, 1992	Kutztown, Pennsylvania	Active	
Texas A&M University–Kingsville	November 13, 1992	Kingsville, Texas	Inactive	
Evangel University	November 16, 1992	Springfield, Missouri	Active	
Rhode Island College	November 25, 1992	Providence, Rhode Island	Active	
Madonna University	December 1, 1992	Livonia, Michigan	Active	
Ferrum College	December 4, 1992	Ferrum, Virginia	Active	
Lenoir–Rhyne University	December 4, 1992	Hickory, North Carolina	Active	
Henderson State University	December 7, 1992	Arkadelphia, Arkansas	Active	
Rollins College Brevard Campus	December 11, 1992	Brevard County, Florida	Inactive	
Williams Baptist University	January 28, 1993	Walnut Ridge, Arkansas.	Inactive	
University of Alabama at Birmingham	February 13, 1993	Birmingham, Alabama	Active	
College of St. Joseph	February 14, 1993	Rutland County, Vermont	Inactive	
Wesleyan University	February 25, 1993	Middletown, Connecticut	Active	
College of Saint Rose	March 26, 1993	Albany, New York	Active	
University of South Carolina Upstate	March 29, 1993	Valley Falls, South Carolina	Active	
Lyon College	April 14, 1993	Batesville, Arkansas	Active	
Yale University	April 14, 1993	New Haven, Connecticut	Active	
Ashland University	April 16, 1993	Ashland, Ohio	Active	
Fort Lewis College	April 16, 1993	Durango, Colorado	Active	
Quincy University	April 18, 1993	Quincy, Illinois	Inactive	
Randolph College	April 18, 1993	Lynchburg, Virginia	Active	
Saint Mary's College of California	April 18, 1993	Moraga, California	Active	
John Brown University	April 19, 1993	Siloam Springs, Arkansas	Active	
Sweet Briar College	April 20, 1993	Sweet Briar, Virginia	Inactive	
University of Portland	April 21, 1993	Portland, Oregon	Active	
Cameron University	April 23, 1993	Lawton, Oklahoma	Active	
Northwestern College	April 28, 1993	Orange City, Iowa	Active	
West Liberty University	April 28, 1993	West Liberty, West Virginia	Active	
Alvernia University	April 29, 1993	Reading, Pennsylvania	Active	
Centenary University	May 5, 1993	Hackettstown, New Jersey	Active	
Elizabeth City State University	May 5, 1993	Elizabeth City, North Carolina	Active	
College of Wooster	May 6, 1993	Wooster, Ohio	Active	
Wayland Baptist University	May 9, 1993	Plainview, Texas	Active	
Dominican University New York	May 12, 1993	Orangeburg, New York	Active	
Pennsylvania State University at Harrisburg	May 14, 1993	Harrisburg, Pennsylvania	Active	
Point Loma Nazarene University	May 14, 1993	San Diego County, California	Active	
Sewanee: The University of the South	May 14, 1993	Sewanee, Tennessee	Active	
Purdue University Northwest	May 16, 1993	Hammond, Indiana	Active	
Cornell College	May 19, 1993	Mount Vernon, Iowa	Active	
Mercer University	May 26, 1993	Macon, Georgia	Active	
Marygrove College	June 23, 1993	Detroit, Michigan	Inactive	
Fairmont State University	September 24, 1993	Fairmont, West Virginia	Active	
Asbury University	October 16, 1993	Wilmore, Kentucky	Active	
Chicago State University	October 24, 1993	Chicago, Illinois	Active	
Georgia College & State University	November 2, 1993	Milledgeville, Georgia	Active	
Minnesota State University, Mankato	November 4, 1993	Mankato, Minnesota	Active	
Shepherd University	November 13, 1993	Shepherdstown, West Virginia	Active	
Southern Nazarene University	November 13, 1993	Bethany, Oklahoma	Active	
Delta State University	December 2, 1993	Cleveland, Mississippi	Active	
Fayetteville State University	December 3, 1993	Fayetteville, North Carolina	Active	
California State University San Marcos	December 9, 1993	San Marcos, California	Active	
University of California, San Diego	January 1, 1994	San Diego, California	Active	
Bennett College	January 28, 1994	Greensboro, North Carolina	Inactive	
Rockhurst University	February 11, 1994	Kansas City, Missouri.	Active	
The College of New Jersey	February 17, 1994	Ewing Township, New Jersey	Active	
University of Virginia's College at Wise	March 5, 1994	Wise, Virginia	Active	
Coker University	March 9, 1994	Hartsville, South Carolina	Active	
Pacific University	March 15, 1994	Forest Grove, Oregon	Active	
Southern Adventist University	March 20, 1994	Collegedale, Tennessee	Active	
Mount Saint Mary College	March 29, 1994	Newburgh, New York	Active	
Wartburg College	April 5, 1994	Waverly, Iowa	Active	
Gordon–Conwell Theological Seminary	April 8, 1994	Hamilton, Massachusetts	Inactive	
Centre College	April 21, 1994	Danville, Kentucky	Inactive	
King University	April 21, 1994	Bristol, Tennessee	Active	
Vanguard University	April 22, 1994	Costa Mesa, California.	Active	
University of Wisconsin–Stout	April 27, 1994	Menomonie, Wisconsin	Active	
College of Santa Fe	April 29, 1994	Santa Fe, New Mexico	Inactive	
University of Massachusetts Dartmouth	April 29, 1994	Dartmouth, Massachusetts	Active	
University of the Cumberlands	May 6, 1994	Williamsburg, Kentucky	Active	
St. Edward's University	May 10, 1994	Austin, Texas	Active	
Southeastern Oklahoma State University	May 11, 1994	Durant, Oklahoma	Inactive	
College of Idaho	May 12, 1994	Caldwell, Idaho	Active	
LaGrange College	May 16, 1994	LaGrange, Georgia	Active	
Jacksonville State University	May 17, 1994	Jacksonville, Alabama	Active	
Southwest Baptist University	May 18, 1994	Bolivar, Missouri	Active	
Wayne State College	May 20, 1994	Wayne, Nebraska	Active	
Lindenwood University	May 21, 1994	St. Charles, Missouri	Active	
York College of Pennsylvania	September 29, 1994	Spring Garden Township, Pennsylvania	Active	
Hawaii Pacific University	November 6, 1994	Honolulu, Hawaii	Active	
Charleston Southern University	November 9, 1994	North Charleston, South Carolina	Active	
Misericordia University	November 11, 1994	Dallas, Pennsylvania	Active	
McNeese State University	December 10, 1994	Lake Charles, Louisiana	Active	
University of Arkansas at Little Rock	February 3, 1995	Little Rock, Arkansas	Active	
Samford University	February 6, 1995	Homewood, Alabama	Active	
Centenary College of Louisiana	February 22, 1995	Shreveport, Louisiana	Active	
University of Rochester	March 7, 1995	Rochester, New York	Active	
Brescia University Psychology Program	March 14, 1995	Owensboro, Kentucky	Active	
Albany State University	March 16, 1995	Albany, Georgia	Active	
Indiana University Kokomo	April 6, 1995	Kokomo, Indiana	Active	
Loras College	April 9, 1995	Dubuque, Iowa	Active	
Indiana University East	April 14, 1995	Richmond, Indiana	Inactive	
George Fox University	April 17, 1995	Newberg, Oregon	Active	
University of Pittsburgh at Greensburg	April 23, 1995	Greensburg, Pennsylvania	Active	
Notre Dame de Namur University	April 26, 1995	Belmont, California	Inactive	
Westmont College	April 26, 1995	Montecito, California	Active	
Ohio State University at Lima	April 27, 1995	Lima, Ohio	Active	
Grove City College	April 28, 1995	Grove City, Pennsylvania	Active	
Mount Mercy University	April 29, 1995	Cedar Rapids, Iowa	Active	
Grand Canyon University	May 3, 1995	Phoenix, Arizona	Active	
Saint Vincent College	May 6, 1995	Latrobe, Pennsylvania	Active	
Talladega College	May 7, 1995	Talladega, Alabama	Active	
Coppin State University	May 12, 1995	Baltimore, Maryland	Active	
Wellesley College	May 12, 1995	Wellesley, Massachusetts	Active	
Saint Michael's College	May 13, 1995	Colchester, Vermont	Active	
Boston College	May 15, 1995	Chestnut Hill, Massachusetts	Active	
Franklin Pierce University	May 16, 1995	Rindge, New Hampshire	Active	
Seattle Pacific University	May 16, 1995	Seattle, Washington	Active	
Walla Walla University	June 1, 1995	College Place, Washington	Active	
California Polytechnic State University, San Luis Obispo	June 5, 1995	San Luis Obispo, California	Active	
Western New Mexico University	June 12, 1995	Silver City, New Mexico	Active	
University of Mary Hardin–Baylor	September 27, 1995	Belton, Texas	Active	
Northwestern Oklahoma State University	October 3, 1995	Alva, Oklahoma	Active	
Arizona State University West campus	November 30, 1995	Phoenix, Arizona	Active	
Lincoln Memorial University	December 1, 1995	Harrogate, Tennessee	Active	
Dartmouth College	January 12, 1996	Hanover, New Hampshire	Inactive	
Culver–Stockton College	February 23, 1996	Canton, Missouri	Active	
Emory & Henry College	March 24, 1996	Emory, Virginia	Active	
Indiana University–Purdue University Fort Wayne	April 16, 1996	Fort Wayne, Indiana	Active	
Greensboro College	April 17, 1996	Greensboro, North Carolina	Active	
Southeastern University	April 25, 1996	Lakeland, Florida	Active	
University of Indianapolis	April 27, 1996	Indianapolis, Indiana	Active	
Morris Brown College	May 3, 1996	Atlanta, Georgia	Inactive	
Chaminade University of Honolulu	May 11, 1996	Honolulu, Hawaii	Active	
Ohio Northern University	May 15, 1996	Ada, Ohio	Active	
Middlebury College	May 24, 1996	Middlebury, Vermont	Inactive	
Concordia University Chicago	May 27, 1996	River Forest, Illinois	Active	
University of Central Florida Cocoa Center	August 10, 1996	Cocoa, Florida	Inactive	
Hendrix College	October 11, 1996	Conway, Arkansas	Active	
Hardin–Simmons University	October 18, 1996	Abilene, Texas	Active	
Widener University	November 11, 1996	Chester, Pennsylvania	Active	
Thomas University	November 19, 1996	Thomasville, Georgia	Active	
Friends University	November 20, 1996	Wichita, Kansas	Inactive	
Park University	December 4, 1996	Parkville, Missouri	Active	
Ursuline College	December 13, 1996	Pepper Pike, Ohio	Active	
Calvin University	February 22, 1997	Grand Rapids, Michigan	Inactive	
Tarleton State University	March 17, 1997	Stephenville, Texas	Active	
Rockford University	April 8, 1997	Rockford, Illinois	Active	
Concordia University Irvine	April 13, 1997	Irvine, California	Active	
University of the District of Columbia	April 17, 1997	Washington, D.C.	Active	
Butler University	April 23, 1997	Indianapolis, Indiana	Active	
Columbia College	April 30, 1997	Columbia, Missouri	Active	
Sul Ross State University	May 1, 1997	Alpine, Texas	Active	
Washington State University Vancouver	May 2, 1997	Vancouver, Washington	Inactive	
University of Vermont	May 3, 1997	Burlington, Vermont	Active	
Vassar College	May 8, 1997	Poughkeepsie, New York	Active	
Illinois College	May 9, 1997	Jacksonville, Illinois	Active	
St. John Fisher University	May 9, 1997	Pittsford, New York	Active	
Northeastern University	May 27, 1997	Boston, Massachusetts	Active	
Rollins College	May 30, 1997	Winter Park, Florida	Active	
Saint Leo University	June 6, 1997	St. Leo, Florida	Active	
Kentucky Wesleyan College	September 2, 1997	Owensboro, Kentucky	Inactive	
Governors State University	September 15, 1997	University Park, Illinois	Active	
Northern Michigan University	September 21, 1997	Marquette, Michigan	Active	
Rochester Christian University	October 1, 1997	Rochester Hills, Michigan	Active	
Saint Meinrad Seminary and School of Theology	October 28, 1997	Saint Meinrad, Indiana	Active	
Gallaudet University	October 29, 1997	Washington, D.C.	Active	
Mount St. Joseph University	January 25, 1998	Delhi Township, Ohio	Active	
Florida Atlantic University	February 27, 1998	Boca Raton, Florida	Inactive	
College of the Ozarks	March 26, 1998	Point Lookout, Missouri	Active	
Corban University	April 20, 1998	Salem, Oregon	Inactive	
Norwich University	April 30, 1998	Northfield, Vermont	Active	
Olivet Nazarene University	April 30, 1998	Bourbonnais, Illinois	Active	
Western Colorado University	May 1, 1998	Gunnison, Colorado	Active	
Mississippi University for Women	May 4, 1998	Columbus, Mississippi	Active	
University of St. Thomas	May 5, 1998	Saint Paul, Minnesota	Active	
Simmons University	May 8, 1998	Boston, Massachusetts	Active	
St. Thomas Aquinas College	May 11, 1998	Sparkill, New York.	Active	
Stern College for Women	May 11, 1998	Murray Hill, Manhattan, New York	Inactive	
Northwest Nazarene University	June 2, 1998	Nampa, Idaho	Active	
Portland State University	June 12, 1998	Portland, Oregon	Active	
State University of New York at Old Westbury	July 28, 1998	Old Westbury, New York	Active	
Ramapo College	November 1, 1998	Mahwah, New Jersey	Active	
Our Lady of the Lake University	November 4, 1998	San Antonio, Texas	Active	
Midland University	November 8, 1998	Fremont, Nebraska	Active	
Anderson University	December 2, 1998	Anderson, Indiana	Active	
Bridgewater College	December 10, 1998	Bridgewater, Virginia	Active	
William Peace University	February 22, 1999	Raleigh, North Carolina	Active	
University of Memphis Lambuth Campus	February 23, 1999	Jackson, Tennessee	Inactive	
Westminster University	April 7, 1999	Salt Lake City, Utah	Active	
Black Hills State University	April 14, 1999	Spearfish, South Dakota	Active	
Clarke University	April 21, 1999	Dubuque, Iowa	Inactive	
Northwest University	April 21, 1999	Kirkland, Washington	Active	
Metropolitan State University	April 23, 1999	Minneapolis and St. Paul, Minnesota	Active	
Oklahoma Christian University	April 25, 1999	Oklahoma City, Oklahoma	Active	
McMurry University	April 28, 1999	Abilene, Texas	Active	
Colby–Sawyer College	May 4, 1999	New London, New Hampshire	Active	
Davidson College	May 7, 1999	Davidson, North Carolina	Active	
Northland College	May 7, 1999	Ashland, Wisconsin	Inactive	
Wisconsin Lutheran College	May 7, 1999	Milwaukee, Wisconsin	Active	
Georgia Tech	May 27, 1999	Atlanta, Georgia	Inactive	
University of Science and Arts of Oklahoma	July 30, 1999 – xxxx ?; 2019	Chickasha, Oklahoma	Active	
Trinity Washington University	September 17, 1999	Washington, D.C.	Active	
Daemen University	October 15, 1999	Amherst, New York	Active	
Louisiana State University Shreveport	November 5, 1999	Shreveport, Louisiana	Active	
Earlham College	November 12, 1999	Richmond, Indiana	Active	
Dakota Wesleyan University	March 23, 2000	Mitchell, South Dakota	Inactive	
Wesley College	April 9, 2000	Dover, Delaware	Inactive	(Note: The college closed in 2021.)
North Central University	April 18, 2000	Minneapolis, Minnesota	Inactive	
Simpson College	April 18, 2000	Indianola, Iowa	Active	
Tennessee Wesleyan University	April 28, 2000	Athens, Tennessee	Active	
University of Wisconsin–Superior	May 1, 2000	Superior, Wisconsin	Active	
Cumberland University	May 4, 2000	Lebanon, Tennessee	Active	
Nelson University	May 5, 2000	Waxahachie, Texas	Active	(Note: Chapter formed at the Southwestern Assemblies of God, now Nelson University.)
Bluffton University	May 6, 2000	Bluffton, Ohio	Active	
Assumption University	May 8, 2000	Worcester, Massachusetts	Active	
La Sierra University	June 15, 2000	Riverside, California	Active	
Walden University	July 21, 2000	Minneapolis, Minnesota	Inactive	
University of Pikeville	August 21, 2000	Pikeville, Kentucky	Active	
Bluefield University	September 10, 2000	Bluefield, Virginia	Inactive	
Azusa Pacific University	November 10, 2000	Azusa, California	Active	
Indiana Wesleyan University	November 17, 2000	Marion, Indiana	Active	
University of Mount Union	December 10, 2000	Alliance, Ohio	Inactive	
University of Central Florida Sanf≥ord-Lake Mary Center	December 13, 2000	Sanford, Florida	Active	
Southwestern Oklahoma State University	January 15, 2001	Weatherford and Sayre, Oklahoma	Inactive	
Eckerd College	March 8, 2001	St. Petersburg, Florida	Active	
University of Houston–Downtown	March 10, 2001	Houston, Texas	Active	
St. Joseph's University	March 30, 2001	Long Island, New York	Active	
University of Southern Mississippi Gulf Coast	April 8, 2001	Hattiesburg, Mississippi	Active	
Texas A&M International University	April 30, 2001	Laredo, Texas	Active	
Mount Mary University	May 3, 2001	Milwaukee, Wisconsin	Inactive	
State University of New York at New Paltz	May 4, 2001	New Paltz, New York	Active	
Manchester University	May 7, 2001	North Manchester, Indiana	Active	
Salve Regina University	May 9, 2001	Newport, Rhode Island	Active	
Southern New Hampshire University	May 11, 2001	Manchester and Hooksett, New Hampshire	Active	
University of Dallas	May 19, 2001	Irving, Texas	Active	
Union University	October 24, 2001	Jackson, Tennessee	Active	
Valdosta State University	December 7, 2001	Valdosta, Georgia	Active	
Roosevelt University Albert A. Robin Campus	December 19, 2001	Schaumburg, Illinois	Inactive	
Milligan University	March 19, 2002	Milligan College, Tennessee	Active	
United States Military Academy	April 8, 2002	West Point, New York	Active	
College of St. Scholastica	April 18, 2002	Duluth, Minnesota	Inactive	
University of Hawaiʻi at West Oʻahu	April 26, 2002	Kapolei, Hawaii	Active	
Abilene Christian University	May 1, 2002	Abilene, Texas	Active	
Prairie View A&M University	May 3, 2002	Prairie View, Texas	Active	
Gordon-Conwell Theological Seminary	May 4, 2002	Charlotte, North Carolina	Inactive	
Buena Vista University	May 14, 2002	Storm Lake, Iowa	Active	
Oregon Institute of Technology	May 16, 2002	Klamath Falls, Oregon	Inactive	
Oregon State University	May 30, 2002	Corvallis, Oregon	Active	
Florida Memorial University	August 21, 2002	Miami Gardens, Florida	Active	
Arkansas Tech University	October 18, 2002	Russellville, Arkansas	Active	
Flagler College	December 5, 2002	St. Augustine, Florida	Active	
Massachusetts College of Liberal Arts	December 11, 2002	North Adams, Massachusetts	Active	
Lynn University	February 7, 2003	Boca Raton, Florida	Active	
University of Victoria	April 8, 2003	Greater Victoria, British Columbia, Canada	Active	
Nova Southeastern University	April 25, 2003	Fort Lauderdale and Davie, Florida	Active	
University of South Carolina Aiken	May 7, 2003	Aiken, South Carolina	Active	
Rogers State University	May 9, 2003	Claremore, Oklahoma	Active	
St. Andrews University	October 15, 2003	Laurinburg, North Carolina	Active	
Freed–Hardeman University	October 16, 2003	Henderson, Tennessee	Active	
Embry–Riddle Aeronautical University	November 14, 2003	Daytona Beach, Florida	Active	
Georgia Southern University–Armstrong Campus	November 18, 2003	Savannah, Georgia	Inactive	
Ohio State University at Newark	November 20, 2003	Newark, Ohio	Active	
Houghton University	December 2, 2003	Houghton, New York	Active	
Coe College	January 23, 2004	Cedar Rapids, Iowa	Active	
Penn State Abington	January 27, 2004	Abington, Pennsylvania	Active	
Clarkson University	February 25, 2004	Potsdam, New York	Active	
Saint Francis University	April 2, 2004	Loretto, Pennsylvania	Active	
Bay Path University	April 25, 2004	Longmeadow, Massachusetts	Active	
Greenville University	May 5, 2004	Greenville, Illinois	Active	
Woodbury University	May 7, 2004	Burbank, California	Inactive	
Penn State Lehigh Valley	May 10, 2004	Center Valley, Pennsylvania	Active	
Campbell University	September 30, 2004	Buies Creek, North Carolina	Active	
University of Wisconsin–Green Bay	October 1, 2004	Green Bay, Wisconsin	Active	
East Texas Baptist University	November 9, 2004	Marshall, Texas	Active	
Southern University at New Orleans	December 1, 2004	New Orleans, Louisiana	Active	
Union College	December 1, 2004	Barbourville, Kentucky	Active	
University of the Sciences	December 3, 2004	Philadelphia, Pennsylvania	Inactive	
Alcorn State University	December 4, 2004	Lorman, Mississippi	Active	
University of West Alabama	April 7, 2005	Livingston, Alabama	Active	
Judson University	April 12, 2005	Elgin, Illinois	Active	
Palm Beach Atlantic University	April 12, 2005	West Palm Beach, Florida	Active	
Messiah University	April 14, 2005	Mechanicsburg, Pennsylvania	Active	
Wingate University	April 19, 2005	Wingate, North Carolina	Active	
Queens University of Charlotte	April 24, 2005	Charlotte, North Carolina	Active	
Newman University, Wichita	April 30, 2005	Wichita, Kansas	Inactive	
Lewis–Clark State College	May 6, 2005	Lewiston, Idaho	Active	
Shenandoah University	June 3, 2005	Winchester, Virginia	Active	
Aurora University	September 23, 2005	Aurora, Illinois	Active	
Siena Heights University	November 11, 2005	Adrian, Michigan	Active	
Virginia Union University	November 20, 2005	Richmond, Virginia	Inactive	
Louisiana State University of Alexandria	November 23, 2005	Alexandria, Louisiana	Active	
University of St. Francis	December 3, 2005	Joliet, Illinois	Active	
Penn State New Kensington	December 9, 2005	New Kensington, Pennsylvania	Active	
Thomas Jefferson University	February 1, 2006	Philadelphia, Pennsylvania	Active	
Brenau University	February 2, 2006	Gainesville, Georgia	Active	
Mitchell College	March 29, 2006	New London, Connecticut	Active	
Stevenson University	April 6, 2006	Baltimore County, Maryland	Active	
Saint Joseph's College of Maine	April 20, 2006	Standish, Maine	Active	
University of Hawaiʻi at Hilo	April 21, 2006	Hilo, Hawaii	Active	
Scripps College	April 27, 2006	Claremont, California	Active	
Framingham State University	April 30, 2006	Framingham, Massachusetts	Active	
McKendree University	April 30, 2006	Lebanon, Illinois	Active	
Brigham Young University–Hawaii	May 3, 2006	Laie, Hawaii	Inactive	
Edgewood College	May 3, 2006	Madison, Wisconsin	Active	
Purdue University Northwest	May 5, 2006	Hammond and Westville, Indiana	Active	
Endicott College	May 8, 2006	Beverly, Massachusetts	Active	
Trinity Christian College	May 19, 2006	Palos Heights, Illinois	Active	
United States Air Force Academy	September 1, 2006	El Paso County, Colorado	Active	
University of Findlay	September 30, 2006	Findlay, Ohio	Active	
Penn State Berks	October 29, 2006	Spring Township, Pennsylvania	Active	
Clayton State University	November 6, 2006	Morrow, Georgia	Active	
Penn State Altoona	February 8, 2007	Logan Township, Pennsylvania		
Gwynedd Mercy University	February 23, 2007	Lower Gwynedd Township, Pennsylvania	Active	
State University of New York at Purchase	April 25, 2007	Purchase, New York	Active	
Chowan University	May 1, 2007	Murfreesboro, North Carolina	Active	
Cazenovia College	May 4, 2007	Cazenovia, New York	Active	
University of Maryland Global Campus	May 6, 2007	Adelphi, Maryland	Active	
Grinnell College	October 9, 2007	Grinnell, Iowa	Active	
Campbellsville University	October 11, 2007	Campbellsville, Kentucky	Active	
Penn State Greater Allegheny	October 22, 2007	McKeesport, Pennsylvania	Active	
University of Arkansas at Pine Bluff	November 8, 2007	Pine Bluff, Arkansas	Inactive	
Adams State University	November 28, 2007	Alamosa, Colorado	Active	
University of Connecticut Stamford	December 3, 2007	Stamford, Connecticut	Inactive	
Victoria University of Wellington	February 15, 2008	Wellington, New Zealand	Inactive	
Walsh University	February 15, 2008	North Canton, Ohio	Active	
Dana College	February 29, 2008	Blair, Nebraska	Inactive	
Bard College	April 12, 2008	Annandale-on-Hudson, New York	Active	
Hiram College	April 30, 2008	Hiram, Ohio	Active	
Maryville University	September 7, 2008	Town and Country, Missouri	Active	
Robert Morris University	October 12, 2008	Moon Township, Pennsylvania	Active	
University of Central Florida Palm Bay	October 13, 2008	Palm Bay, Florida	Inactive	(Note: Campus closed in 2023.)
University of Puerto Rico at Mayagüez	October 23, 2008	Mayagüez, Puerto Rico	Active	
University of Northwestern – St. Paul	November 14, 2008	Roseville, Minnesota	Inactive	
University of Texas at Brownsville	December 2, 2008	Brownsville, Texas	Inactive	
Millsaps College	December 7, 2008	Jackson, Mississippi	Active	
California State University Channel Islands	December 8, 2008	Camarillo, California	Active	
Texas Southern University	December 12, 2008	Houston, Texas	Inactive	
University of Galway	January 23, 2009	Galway, Connacht, Ireland	Inactive	
University of the Virgin Islands	April 9, 2009	St. Croix, United States Virgin Islands	Active	
Concordia University	April 18, 2009	Portland, Oregon	Inactive	(Note: The university closed in 2020.)
University of Arkansas at Monticello	April 21, 2009	Monticello, Arkansas	Active	
Bryant University	May 5, 2009	Smithfield, Rhode Island	Active	
Fontbonne University	May 15, 2009	Clayton, Missouri	Active	
Michigan Technological University	April 17, 2010	Houghton, Michigan	Active	
North Greenville University	April 26, 2010	Tigerville, South Carolina	Active	
Lasell University	April 27, 2010	Auburndale, Massachusetts	Active	
University of New England	April 29, 2010	Portland and Biddeford, Maine	Active	
Fielding Graduate University	July 29, 2010	Santa Barbara, California	Inactive	
Purdue University Global	August 18, 2010	online	Active	
California State University, Monterey Bay	November 5, 2010	Monterey County, California	Active	
University of the Incarnate Word	November 5, 2010	San Antonio, Texas	Active	
Franklin College	November 10, 2010	Franklin, Indiana	Active	
Regent University	November 17, 2010	Virginia Beach, Virginia	Active	
Curry College	November 19, 2010	Milton, Massachusetts	Active	
Haverford College	February 3, 2011	Haverford, Pennsylvania	Inactive	
University of Puerto Rico, Río Piedras Campus	March 4, 2011	San Juan, Puerto Rico	Active	
Claremont Graduate University	April 7, 2011	Claremont, California	Active	
Warren Wilson College	April 7, 2011	Swannanoa, North Carolina	Active	
Simpson University	April 20, 2011	Redding, California	Active	
Mount Vernon Nazarene University	April 28, 2011	Mount Vernon, Ohio	Active	
Virginia Military Institute	May 3, 2011	Lexington, Virginia	Inactive	
Georgia Gwinnett College	May 24, 2011	Lawrenceville, Georgia	Active	
Touro University	June 16, 2011	New York City, New York	Active	
Rivier University	November 11, 2011	Nashua, New Hampshire	Active	
LeTourneau University	November 22, 2011	Longview, Texas	Active	
University of British Columbia Vancouver Campus	November 23, 2011	Vancouver, British Columbia, Canada	Active	
University of the West Indies Cave Hill	January 5, 2012	Cave Hill, Saint Michael, Barbados	Inactive	
Farmingdale State College	January 6, 2012	East Farmingdale, New York	Active	
The American University in Cairo	February 1, 2012	Cairo, Egypt	Active	
University of California, Merced	April 2, 2012	Merced, California	Active	
Tusculum University	April 9, 2012	Tusculum, Tennessee	Active	
Concordia University Wisconsin	April 25, 2012	Mequon, Wisconsin	Active	
Philadelphia College of Osteopathic Medicine	June 13, 2012	Philadelphia, Pennsylvania	Active	
Mississippi State University Meridian Campus	August 7, 2012	Meridian, Mississippi	Active	
Felician University	October 1, 2012	Rutherford, New Jersey	Active	
Shawnee State University	October 8, 2012	Portsmouth, Ohio	Active	
Howard Payne University	February 27, 2013	Brownwood, Texas	Inactive	
University of the West Indies St. Augustine Campus	March 21, 2013	Saint Augustine, Trinidad and Tobago	Active	
Huntington University	April 1, 2013	Huntington, Indiana	Active	
William Woods University	April 10, 2013	Fulton, Missouri	Active	
Lakehead University	April 13, 2013	Thunder Bay, Ontario, Canada	Active	
Kenyon College	April 28, 2013	Gambier, Ohio	Active	
Life University	May 1, 2013	Marietta, Georgia	Active	
Alabama State University	May 8, 2013	Montgomery, Alabama	Active	
Universidad del Valle de Guatemala	June 1, 2013	Guatemala City, Guatemala	Active	
Carlow University	July 25, 2013	Pittsburgh, Pennsylvania	Active	
Patrice Lumumba Peoples' Friendship University of Russia	October 10, 2013	Moscow, Russia	Active	
University of South Florida Sarasota–Manatee	October 16, 2013	Sarasota, Florida	Inactive	
Blackburn College	January 30, 2014	Carlinville, Illinois	Active	
Central Methodist University	March 3, 2014	Fayette, Missouri	Active	
Hobart and William Smith Colleges	March 5, 2014	Geneva, New York	Active	
Florida Gulf Coast University	March 18, 2014	Fort Myers, Florida	Active	
All Hallows College	March 26, 2014	Dublin, Ireland	Inactive	(Note: The college closed and was sold to Dublin City University in 2016, becoming the All Hallows Campus of Dublin City University.)
Ferris State University	April 7, 2014	Big Rapids, Michigan	Active	
Southern Polytechnic State University	April 10, 2014	Marietta, Georgia	Inactive	
Lindenwood University – Belleville	April 21, 2014	Belleville, Illinois	Inactive	
Lake Superior State University	April 27, 2014	Sault Ste. Marie, Michigan	Active	
Husson University	May 4, 2014	Bangor, Maine	Active	
Upper Iowa University	May 6, 2014	Fayette, Iowa	Active	
Stillman College	May 7, 2014	Tuscaloosa, Alabama	Active	
Midwestern University - Downers Grove Campus	July 11, 2014	Downers Grove, Illinois	Active	
Dalton State College	August 8, 2014	Dalton, Georgia	Active	
Trinity Western University	September 30, 2014	Canada	Active	
Pennsylvania State University World Campus	October 24, 2014	online	Active	
Alliant International University Los Angeles	October 29, 2014	Los Angeles, California	Active	
Mars Hill University	December 4, 2014	Mars Hill, North Carolina	Active	
Utah Tech University	January 29, 2015	St. George, Utah	Active	
Michigan School of Psychology	February 25, 2015	Farmington Hills, Michigan	Active	
Marymount California University	March 27, 2015	Rancho Palos Verdes, California	Inactive	(Note: The university closed in August 2022.)
Fisher College	April 7, 2015	Boston, Massachusetts	Active	
Saint Martin's University	April 9, 2015	Lacey, Washington	Active	
University of South Carolina Beaufort	April 21, 2015	Bluffton, South Carolina	Active	
Nevada State University	April 24, 2015	Henderson, Nevada	Active	
CUNY Graduate Center	April 24, 2015	New York City, New York	Active	
Texas A&M University–San Antonio	April 29, 2015	San Antonio, Texas	Active	
HELP University	June 1, 2015	Kuala Lumpur, Malaysia	Active	
Faulkner University	October 6, 2015	Montgomery, Alabama	Active	
Ohio Valley University	November 10, 2015	Vienna, West Virginia	Inactive	
Ohio State University at Mansfield	November 13, 2015	Mansfield, Ohio	Active	
Concordia University Texas	December 4, 2015	Austin, Texas	Active	
Claflin University	January 25, 2016	Orangeburg, South Carolina	Active	
Midwestern University-Glendale	February 9, 2016	Glendale, Arizona	Active	
Süleyman Şah Üniversitesi	February 17, 2016	Istanbul, Turkey	Inactive	(Note: The university is closed.)
Taylor University	February 22, 2016	Upland, Indiana	Active	
Brevard College	April 5, 2016	Brevard, North Carolina	Active	
University of Washington Tacoma	April 7, 2016	Tacoma, Washington	Active	
Newbury College	April 12, 2016	Brookline, Massachusetts	Inactive	(Note: College closed after the 2018–19 academic year.)
Hilbert College	April 15, 2016	Hamburg, New York	Active	
Lakeland University	April 20, 2016	Sheboygan, Wisconsin	Active	
Huston–Tillotson University	April 27, 2016	Austin, Texas	Active	
Penn State Brandywine	April 28, 2016	Middletown Township, Pennsylvania	Active	
Augustana University	May 10, 2016	Sioux Falls, South Dakota	Active	
Wisconsin School of Professional Psychology	May 13, 2016	Milwaukee, Wisconsin	Active	
Palo Alto University	June 3, 2016	Palo Alto, California	Active	
Wilmington University	October 20, 2016	Wilmington Manor, Delaware	Active	
University Central Florida Valencia-Osceola Center	December 7, 2016	Kissimmee, Florida	Active	
Hope International University	December 14, 2016	Fullerton, California	Active	
Universidad San Francisco de Quito	February 10, 2017	Quito, Ecuador	Inactive	
Limestone University	February 18, 2017	Gaffney, South Carolina	Inactive	
University of Dubuque	April 4, 2017	Dubuque, Iowa	Inactive	
Peru State College	April 8, 2017	Peru, Nebraska	Active	
Columbia College	April 9, 2017	Columbia, South Carolina	Active	
University of Guelph-Humber	April 13, 2017	Toronto, Ontario, Canada	Active	
Champlain College	April 23, 2017	Burlington, Vermont	Active	
Rochester Institute of Technology	May 2, 2017	Henrietta, New York	Active	
Kentucky State University	May 12, 2017	Frankfort, Kentucky	Active	
Uniformed Services University of the Health Sciences	May 24, 2017	Bethesda, Maryland	Inactive	
Columbia University	September 15, 2017	New York City, New York	Active	
University of Toronto Scarborough	October 3, 2017	Scarborough, Ontario, Canada	Active	
Keiser University	November 15, 2017	Fort Lauderdale, Florida	Active	
Eureka College	December 5, 2017	Eureka, Illinois	Active	
University of Nicosia	January 31, 2018	Nicosia, Cyprus	Active	
Grand View University	March 6, 2018	Des Moines, Iowa	Active	
University of North Texas at Dallas	March 6, 2018	Dallas, Texas	Active	
University of Guam	April 27, 2018	Mangilao, Guam	Active	
Holy Cross College	October 2, 2018	Notre Dame, Indiana	Active	
Washington State University Global Campus	March 2, 2019	Pullman, Washington	Active	
Barton College	2019	Wilson, North Carolina	Active	
Embry-Riddle Aeronautical University, Prescott	2019	Prescott, Arizona	Active	
Lincoln University	2019	Jefferson City, Missouri	Active	
New England College	2019	Henniker, New Hampshire	Active	
Ottawa University	2019	Surprise, Arizona	Inactive	
Pillar College	2019	Newark, New Jersey	Active	
Salem College	2019	Winston-Salem, North Carolina	Active	
Viterbo University	2019	La Crosse, Wisconsin	Active	
William James College	2019	Newton, Massachusetts	Inactive	
University of New Brunswick	2019	Fredericton and Saint John, New Brunswick, Canada	Active	
Universidad de Sonora	2019	Hermosillo, Sonora, Mexico	Active	
Yerevan State University	December 2019	Yerevan, Armenia	Active	
Tyndale University		Toronto, Ontario, Canada	Active	
University of the Pacific	201x ?	Stockton, California	Active	
Mercer University College of Professional Advancement	2020	Atlanta, Georgia	Active	
Keuka College	April 11, 2020	Keuka Park, New York	Active	
Ozyegin University	August 2020	Istanbul, Turkey	Active	
University of Lincoln	October 2020	Lincoln, England, United Kingdom	Inactive	
Nnamdi Azikiwe University	November 2020	Anka, Nigeria	Inactive	
Universita Cattolica del Sacro Cuore	January 2021	Milan, Italy	Active	
American University of Sharjah	January 2021	Sharjah, United Arab Emirates	Active	
Criswell College	April 6, 2021	Dallas, Texas	Active	
Pontificia Universidad Javeriana	May 2021	Bogotá, Colombia	Inactive	
Effat University	July 2021	Jeddah, Saudi Arabia	Active	
Albizu University	202x ?	San Juan, Puerto Rico	Active	
College of Coastal Georgia	December 3, 2021	Brunswick, Georgia	Active	
Wenzhou-Kean University	November 17, 2022	Wenzhou, China	Active	
Universidad Iberoamericana	January 19, 2023	Santo Domingo, Dominican Republic	Active	
Valley City State University	April 24, 2023	Valley City, North Dakota	Active	
Averett University	20xx ?	Danville, Virginia	Active	
Chicago School of Professional Psychology	20xx ?	Georgia (online)	Active	
Dallas Baptist College	20xx ?	Dallas, Texas	Active	
Grambling State University	20xx ?	Grambling, Louisiana	Active	
Middle Georgia State University	20xx ?	Macon, Georgia	Active	
The New School	20xx ?	Greenwich Village, New York City, New York	Active	
Northwestern University	20xx ?	Evanston, Illinois	Active	
Rosalind Franklin University of Medicine and Science	20xx ?	North Chicago, Illinois	Active	
Southwestern Christian University	20xx ?	Bethany, Oklahoma	Active	
Texas A&M University–Central Texas	20xx ?	Killeen, Texas	Active	
University of Richmond	20xx ?	Richmond, Virginia	Active	
Utah Valley University	2025	Orem, Utah	Active	
