= Farallon Steamship Disaster =

Steamship that hit a reef in Alaska in 1910

- Location: Territory of Alaska; 59°37′36.66″N 153°31′41.27″W (estimated)
- Type: Maritime disaster
- Cause: Collision with Black reef

The survivors collecting provisions from the wreck

The survivors collecting firewood

The Farallon Steamship Disaster was the wreck of a wooden Alaska Steamship Company passenger liner, SS Farallon, that hit Black Reef in Cook Inlet in the Territory of Alaska on 5 January 1910. All on board evacuated to a nearby island, where most had to survive for a month in a mid-winter climate before they were rescued. Six other survivors survived an attempt to row across Shelikof Strait in search of rescue for the stranded men.

== Construction and design of SS Farallon ==
On 27 January 1902, SS Farallon entered service as the fourth ship in the Alaska Steamship Company fleet. She was a wooden steamer rigged as a schooner, having a two-masted fore-and-aft rig with both a foremast and mainmast. She was named after the Farallon Islands – from the Spanish word farallones, meaning rock or cliff in the sea – located in the Pacific Ocean 26 miles (42 km) off San Francisco, California. She was 171 feet (52 m) long with a 34 feet (10 m) beam, a gross register tonnage of 749, a net register tonnage of 565, and a cargo hold more than 10 feet (3.0 m) deep. This deep hold allowed the ship to transport over 400,000 board feet of lumber at a time, including Pacific Coast fir, pine, redwood, and cedar.

== Wreck ==
Farallon departed Valdez bound for Unalaska in the Aleutian Islands and way ports with eight passengers, a crew of 30, and a cargo of 30 tons of general merchandise aboard on 2 January 1910. Caught in a blinding snowstorm with extremely high winds on 5 January, Farallon ran aground on Black Reef in Cook Inlet 1 nautical mile (1.9 km; 1.2 mi) from shore. The ship struck the reef around 5:00 a.m. when the tides were very high. Within a matter of hours, however, the waters receded. Farallon′s crew deemed the damage to the ship irreparable and evacuation essential.

== Survival ==
The passengers and crew of Farallon took to the lifeboats, but not without difficulty. All on board, 38 men, eventually evacuated to the shore of Iliamna Bay, but the extremely high surf and a large amount of ice made landing on the coast dangerous. Once ashore, the men faced relentless cold, snow, and a lack of adequate food supplies. They lived off the few provisions and supplies that they had been able to save from the wreck, including sails, tarpaulins, passenger baggage, and mattresses. They had no artificial source of light, and had to acquire water by melting snow. A typical meal included raw bacon and frozen bread. Throughout their ordeal, the men travelled back to the shipwreck to scavenge any useful materials they could find. Consequently, they haphazardly constructed several convenience items, including makeshift stoves. As temperatures plummeted to −40 °F (−40 °C), they built fires using driftwood found along the shore. The steamer SS Victoria finally rescued them on 3 February 1910, 29 days after they were stranded.

=== J.E. Thwaites and his documentation ===
John Edward Thwaites worked as a shipboard mail clerk on the route from Valdez to Unalaska, Alaska. He held the responsibility of making monthly mail deliveries to the people of southwestern Alaska living in areas inaccessible by any other means. His office was in the "mail closet," a stateroom often located on the port side of the schooners operating on the route.

Thwaites mainly served aboard SS Dora, a ship that was part of the Northwestern Steamship Company fleet, but also was assigned to other schooners travelling in the Alaskan region and was one of the men on board Farallon when she was wrecked. Thwaites was an amateur photographer who owned a Kodak 3-A Special camera, popular in the postcard industry. He used photography to document the events of the wreck of Farallon and the subsequent efforts of the shipwrecked men to survive while stranded on the shore of Iliamna Bay, depicting the desolate and harsh environment the men and documenting the survival efforts the men made to stay alive. While Thwaites had no professional training or schooling in photography, he was able to take advantage of the expanding postcard industry and sell his images for a profit.

=== The brave six ===
Of the 38 men aboard Farallon, six – Gus Swanson, the second mate of Farallon; Charles Peterson, a seaman; Ottoe Nelson, a seamen; Albert Bailey, a passenger; Charles Bourne, a resident of Afognak, Alaska, and Farallon′s Captain Weidingdid – did not stay at Iliamna Bay. They instead attempted to reach Kodiak Island in the hope of arranging a rescue. They set out on 7 January 1910 from the wreck in a 12-foot (3.7 m) lifeboat to row across the Shelikof Strait, one of the most dangerous bodies of water in the Western Hemisphere.

When the men left, the wind was blowing north by northwest, but during the night the wind increased and the group was forced to beach their rowboat at Ursus Cove and remain there until morning. The following morning, 8 January 1910, when the men returned to the water, there was a new northeast wind and a heavy snowstorm. Suddenly, in mid-morning, the wind changed course and began blowing very strongly toward the northwest. The small rowboat stood no chance against the heavy seas and the men and boat soon became completely ice-coated. The ice weighed down the boat to the point where it could hardly stay afloat and the group was once again forced to find a place to land. That evening, heavy pack ice completely crushed the lifeboat. Luckily, the men were not far from shore, but the boat sank with almost all their provisions and they were forced to walk shoulder-high through the ice-cold water. They eventually reached the shore at Cape Douglas, Alaska.

The following morning, 9 January 1910, the party trekked to the top of the cliff above the beach for protection from the high seas and wind, and there they constructed a makeshift tent and fire. The physical state of the men was deteriorating quickly . All of them were frostbitten and some were showing the early signs of hypothermia. For the next 38 hours they stayed on the cliff in a desperate attempt to regain strength. Once the strong winds died down, the men walked two miles (3.2 km) from the cliff and found the camp of Michael Pablow, a fur trapper, who owned his own small schooner. Although Pablow refused to attempt to cross the strait, he supplied the ravenous men with provisions. The group did not leave Pablow's camp until 7 February 1910 because of intense storms. Albert Bailey and Otto Nelson then led the way to Kaguak on foot while Swanson, Peterson, Bourne, and Weiding followed in a bidarka – a type of skin-covered kayak – because they had lost their ability to walk. The men found an old skiff at Kaguak, dug it out of the snow, and – except for Bourne, was forced to stay with the natives at Kaguak because of physical disability – began making their way across the strait to Kafliar Bay on 12 February 1910. The men were able to reach Cape Ugat on Kodiak Island before a fierce wind once again destroyed their vessel. Fortunately, the party was able to travel on land to the village of Ugansk, but remained stormbound there until 5 March 1910. On 5 March, the people of Ugansk provided the men with a dory, a small flat-bottomed boat. In this, the men reached Afognak. Finally on 11 March 1910, just before midnight, Swanson, Peterson, Nelson, and Bailey were brought into Seward, Alaska, aboard USRC Tahoma, a United States Revenue Cutter Service cutter that had been searching for the men for almost three weeks. Tahoma then retrieved Bourne from Kaguak and Captain Weiding from Kodiak Island, where he had been forced to stay due to hypothermia.

== In popular culture ==
Steve K. Lloyd wrote a book on the story. Ray Mears, the British woodsman, instructor, businessman, author and TV presenter based a programme of his TV series "Ray Mears' Extreme Survival" on the story of the survival of those shipwrecked.
