= Archbishop Spyridon =

Archbishop Spyridon may refer to:

- Archbishop Spyridon of America
- Archbishop Spyridon of Athens

== See also ==
- Spyridon
