= Špirić =

Špirić is a surname found in Croatia, Bosnia and Serbia, a patronymic derived from Špiro. Notable people with the surname include:

- Nikola Špirić (born 1956), Bosnian politician
- Jelena Špirić (born 1983), Serbian women's basketball player
