= Spyridon =

Spyridon (Ancient Greek: Σπυρίδων; Greek: Σπυρίδωνας) or Spiridon is a male given name. It is often shortened to Σπύρος (Spyros) and can sometimes be found as Σπυρέτος(Spyretos), sometimes Anglicised as Spyro or Spiro.

Notable people with the name include:

== Given name ==
- Saint Spyridon, Christian saint

- Saint Spyridon Church, Romanian Orthodox church in Iași, Romania
- St Spyridon College, Greek Orthodox school in Sydney

- Spyridon of Serbia (1379–1389), Patriarch of the Serbian Patriarchate of Peć and Eastern Orthodox saint
- Spyridon of Athens, Archbishop of Athens from 1949 to 1956
- Spiro Agnew, 39th vice president of the United States from 1969 to 1973, under President Richard Nixon
- Spyridon Belokas (1877–unknown), Greek runner
- Spyros Christopoulos, Greek footballer
- Spiridon Gabrovski, Bulgarian clergyman
- Spyridon Gianniotis, freestyle swimmer
- Spyros Gogolos, Greek footballer
- Spiridon Gopčević (1855–1928), Serbian astronomer and historian
- Spyros Kokotos, Greek architect
- Spyros Kyprianou, 2nd President of the Republic of Cyprus
- Spyridon Lambros, Greek history professor and former Prime Minister of Greece
- Spyros Livathinos, Greek footballer and football coach
- Spyridon Louis, gold medalist of the first modern Olympic Marathon
- Spyridon Marinatos, 20th-century archaeologist
- Spyros Markezinis, Greek politician
- Spyridon Mavrogenis, Phanariot (Ottoman) Greek doctor
- Spyridon Mercouris, Greek politician, long-time mayor of Athens
- Spyros Moustakas, Greek writer
- Spyros Moustaklis, Greek democracy activist
- Spyros Paliouras, Greek writer
- Spiridon Popescu (1864–1933), Romanian writer
- Spiridon Putin (1879–1965), Russian chef for Vladimir Lenin and Joseph Stalin, grandfather of Vladimir Putin
- Spiridione Roma, 18th-century Greek painter traveled to London
- Spyros Spyromilios, Greek Gendarmerie officer in the Greek struggle for Macedonia
- Spyridon Samaras, Greek composer
- Spiridon Stais, Greek sport shooter
- Spyridon Stais, Greek politician
- Spyridon Trikoupis, former Prime Minister of Greece
- Spyros Vallas, Greek footballer
- Spyridon Vasdekis, Greek long jumper
- Spyridon Vasileiadis, Greek poet and playwright
- Spyros Vrettos, Greek poet
- Spyridon Xyndas, 19th-century musician

== Surname ==
- Alexandru Spiridon, Moldovan footballer and football manager
- Simona Spiridon, Romanian-Austrian handballer

== See also ==
- Spiridon (disambiguation)
- Aghios Spyridon, a ship otherwise known as Empire Cape, an Empire ship
