= Clark Moustakas =

American psychologist

Clark E. Moustakas (26 May 1923 – 10 October 2012) was an American psychologist associated with humanistic and clinical psychology. He was involved in establishing the Association for Humanistic Psychology and the Journal of Humanistic Psychology, and was affiliated with the Michigan School of Psychology (formerly the Center for Humanistic Studies).

== Biography ==
Born into a Greek family in Detroit, Michigan, Moustakas received his doctorate in Educational and Clinical Psychology at Columbia University in 1949, after which he joined the faculty at the Merrill-Palmer Institute at Wayne State University.

In 1962, he participated in the formation of the Association for Humanistic Psychology and the Journal of Humanistic Psychology. In 1980, he co-founded the Center for Humanistic Studies (CHS) with Cereta Perry, Ph.D., Bruce Douglass, Ph.D., and Diane Blau, Ph.D., which was renamed the Michigan School of Professional Psychology (MiSPP) in 2006, and subsequently the Michigan School of Psychology (MSP) in 2018.

Moustakas died on 10 October 2012 at his home in Farmington Hills, Michigan, at the age of 89.

== Bibliography ==
- Moustakas, C., & Moustakas, K. (2004). Loneliness, creativity and love: Awakening meanings in life. Philadelphia, PA: XLibris.
- Moustakas, C. (2002). Solitude and communion. Association for the Integration of the Whole Person, 2(2), 15.
- Moustakas, C. (2000). Heuristic research revisited. In K. J. Schneider, J. F. T. Bugental, & J. F. Pierson, Eds.), The handbook of humanistic psychology: Leading edges in theory, research, and practice (pp. 263–274). Thousand Oaks, CA: Sage.
- Moustakas, C. (1999). Loneliness and self-disclosure. In A. C. Richards & T. Schumrun,(Eds.), Invitations to dialogue: The legacy of Sidney M. Jourard (pp. 107–112). Dubuque, IA: Kendall/Hunt Publishing.
- Moustakas, C. (1997). Relationship play therapy. Northvale, NJ: Jason Aronson.
- Moustakas, C. (1995). Being-in, being-for, being-with. Northvale, NJ: Jason Aronson.
- Moustakas, C. (1994). Phenomenological research methods. Thousand Oaks, CA: Sage.
- Moustakas, C. (1994). Existential psychotherapy and the interpretation of dreams. Northvale, NJ: Jason Aronson.
- Moustakas, C. (1994). The I and thou of evidence; A fusion of opposites. The Humanistic Psychologist, 22, 238-240.
- Moustakas, C. (1992). Firebrand: the experience of being different. The Humanistic Psychologist, 20(2-3), 175-188.
- Moustakas, C. & Mealy, J. (1992). Leaving home. ICIS Forum, 22(2), 65-66.
- Moustakas, C. (1991). An open letter to the members of the National Psychology Advisory Association. NPAA Communicator, 2(1), 1-3.
- Moustakas, C. (1990). Heuristic research: Design, methodology and applications. Newbury Park, CA: Sage.
- Moustakas, C. (1988). Phenomenology, science and psychotherapy. Sydney, N.S: Family Life Institute, University College of Cape Breton. Rev. 11/11/2010 2
- Moustakas, C. (1987). Phenomenology, discovery, and meaning. Michigan Journal of Counseling and Development, 18(1), 21-24.
- Moustakas, C. (1986). Being in, being for, and being with. The Humanistic Psychologist, 14(2), 100-104.
- Moustakas, C. (1986). Origins of humanistic psychology. The Humanistic Psychologist, 14(2), 122-123.
- Moustakas, C. (1986). The nature and essence of poetry: A phenomenological view. Forum for Correspondence and Contact, 16(3), 3-5.
- Moustakas, C. (1985). Humanistic or humanism? Journal of Humanistic Psychology, 25(3), 5-12.
- Moustakas, C., & Douglass, B. (1985). Heuristic inquiry: The internal search to know. Journal of Humanistic Psychology, 25(3), 39-55.
- Moustakas, C. (1984). Clark Moustakas [Interview with Diane de Vienne and Stephanie Mevrin]. Therapy Now, 1(1), 26.
- Moustakas, C. (1982). Emotional adjustment and the play therapy process. In G.L. Landreth (Ed.), Play therapy: Dynamics of the process of counseling with children (pp. 217–230). Springfield, IL: Thomas. (Reprinted from (1955) Journal of Genetic Psychology, 86, 79-99.)
- Moustakas, C. (1981). Rhythms, rituals and relationships. Detroit, MI: Center for Humanistic Studies.
- Moustakas, C. (1981). Heuristic research. In P. Reason & J. Rowan (Eds.), Human inquiry: A sourcebook new paradigm research (pp. 207–217). New York, NY: J. Wiley. (Reprinted from Bugental, J. (Ed.). (1967). Challenges of humanistic psychology (pp. 100–107). New York, NY: McGraw-Hill.)
- Moustakas, C. (1980). Authenticity or betrayal. In V. Hash (Ed.), Readings in human relations (pp. 2–16). Lexington, MA: Genn.
- Moustakas, C. (1977). Turning points. Englewood Cliffs, NJ: Prentice-Hall.
- Moustakas, C. (1977). Creative life. New York, NY: Van Nostrand.
- Moustakas, C. (1975). Who will listen?: Children and parents in play therapy. New Rev. 11/11/2010 3 York, NY: Ballantine Books.
- Moustakas, C. (1975). The touch of loneliness. Englewood Cliffs, NJ: Prentice-Hall.
- Moustakas, C. (1974). Conflict with a pupil. In L. Chamberlain & I. Carnot (Eds.), Improving school discipline. Springfield, IL: Charles C. Thomas.
- Moustakas, C. (1974). Alienation, education and existential life. In A. Kraft (Ed.), The human classroom. New York, NY: Harper & Row.
- Moustakas, C. (1974). Finding yourself, finding others. Englewood Cliffs, NJ: Prentice-Hall.
- Moustakas, C. (1974). Portraits of loneliness and love. Englewood Cliffs, NJ: Prentice-Hall.
- Moustakas, C., & Perry, C. (1973). I wish I knew how it would feel to be free: Humanizing learning in public schools. Detroit, MI: Merrill-Palmer Institute.
- Moustakas, C., & Perry, C. (1973). Learning to be free. Englewood Cliffs, NJ: Prentice-Hall.
- Moustakas, C. (1973). Loneliness. In F.T. Severin (Ed.), Discovering man in psychology. (pp. 50–52). New York, NY: McGraw-Hill. (Reprinted from Moustakas, C.) (1961). Loneliness (pp. ix-xi). Englewood Cliffs, NJ: Prentice-Hall.)
- Moustakas, C. (Ed.). (1973). The child's discovery of himself. New York, NY: Jason Aronson.
- Moustakas, C. (1972). Sex and self. In E. Eldridge (Ed.), Family relations. Dubuque, IA: Kendall/Hunt.
- Moustakas, C. (1972). Loneliness and love. Englewood Cliffs, NJ: Prentice-Hall.
- Moustakas, C. (1970). Loneliness and love. In B. Marshall (Ed.), Experience in being. Pacific Grove, CA: Brooks/Cole.
- Moustakas, C. (1969). Personal growth: The struggle for identity and human values. Cambridge, MA: H. A. Doyle.
- Moustakas, C. (1969). Confrontation and encounter. In L. Natalico, C. Hereford (Eds.), The teacher as a person. Dubuque, IA: W.C. Brown. Rev. 11/11/2010 4
- Moustakas, C. (1968). Individuality and encounter. Cambridge, MA: Howard A. Doyle.
- Moustakas, C. (1967). Creativity and conformity. New York, NY: D. Van Nostrand.
- Moustakas, C. (1967). Heuristic research. In J. Bugental (Ed.), Challenges in humanistic Psychology (pp. 100–107). New York, NY: McGraw-Hill.
- Moustakas, C. (Ed.). (1966). Existential child therapy. New York, NY: Basic Books.
- Moustakas, C. (1966). The authentic teacher: Sensitivity and awareness in the classroom. Cambridge, MA: Howard A. Doyle.
- Moustakas, C. (1965). True experience and the self. In D. Hamacheck (Ed.), The self in growth, teaching and learning (pp. 40–48). Englewood Cliffs, NJ: Prentice-Hall. (Reprinted from The self, pp. 3–14, by Clark Moustakas, 1956, New York, NY: Harper & Row)
- Moustakas, C. (1965).The sense of self. In F.T. Severin (Ed.), Humanistic viewpoints in psychology (pp. 349–356). New York, NY: McGraw-Hill. (Abridged from Journal of humanistic psychology, 1(1), 20-34, 1961)
- Moustakas, C. (1964). The burden of sensitivity and comparison in the onset of a brain seizure. Psychotherapy, 1(2), 67-74.
- Moustakas, C. (1963). Situational play therapy. In H. Peters, A. Riccio & J. Tuaranta (Eds.), Guidance in the elementary schools. New York, NY: MacMillan.
- Moustakas, C. (1963). Verbatim dialogue of a mother and child in therapy. Genetic Psychology Monographs, 67, 3-43.
- Moustakas, C. (1962). The sense of honesty. Psychologia, 5, 146-151.
- Moustakas, C. (1962). Honesty, idiocy and manipulation. Journal of Humanistic Psychology, 2(2), 1-15.
- Moustakas, C. (1962). Confrontation and encounter. Journal of Existential Psychiatry, 2(7), 263-290.
- Moustakas, C. (1961). The sense of self. Journal of Humanistic Psychology, 1(1), 20-34.
- Moustakas, C. (1961). Loneliness. Englewood Cliffs, NJ: Prentice-Hall.
- Moustakas, C. (1960). Communal loneliness. Psychologia, 3(3), 186-190. Rev. 11/11/2010 5
- Moustakas, C. (1959). Preface. In M.P. Berson, Kindergarten: Your child’s big step (pp. 7–9). New York, NY: Dutton.
- Moustakas, C. (1959). The alive and growing teacher. New York, NY: Philosophical Library.
- Moustakas, C. (1959). Psychotherapy with children: The living relationship. New York, NY: Ballantine Books.
- Moustakas, C. (1959). Creativity, conformity and the self. In M. Andrews (Ed.), Creativity and mental health. New York, NY: Syracuse University Press.
- Moustakas, C. (1958). Dimensions of the human relationship. Main Currents in Modern Thought, 14, 109-110.
- Moustakas, C., & Smillie, D. (1957). The significance of individual creativity for psychotherapy. Journal of Individual Psychology, 13, 159-164.
- Moustakas, C. (1957). Spoiled behavior in the school-age child. Child Study, 35, 16-21.
- Moustakas, C. (Ed.). (1956). The self: Explorations in personal growth. New York, NY:Harper & Row.
- Moustakas, C. (1956). The teacher and the child: Personal interaction in the classroom. New York, NY: McGraw-Hill.
- Moustakas, C., & Berson, M. (1956). The young child in school. New York, NY:Whiteside.
- Moustakas, C., & Callahan, R. (1956). Reflections on reflection of feelings. Journal of Social Psychology, 43, 323-331.
- Moustakas, C., & Schalock, H. (1955). An analysis of therapist-child interaction in play therapy. Child Development, 26, 143-157.
- Moustakas, C. (1955). The frequency and intensity of negative attitudes expressed in play therapy: A comparison of well-adjusted and disturbed young children. Journal of General Psychology, 86, 79-99.
- Moustakas, C., & Berson, M. (1955). The nursery school and the child care center. New York, NY: William Morrow.Rev. 11/11/2010 6
- Moustakas, C. (1953). Children in play therapy. New York, NY: McGraw-Hill.
- Moustakas, C., & Makowsky, C. (1952). Client-centered therapy with parents. Journal of Consulting Psychology, 16, 338-342.
- Moustakas, C. (1952). Personality studies conducted in nursery schools. Journal of Educational Research, 46, 161-177.
- Moustakas, C. (1951). A directory of nursery schools and child care centers in the United States. Detroit, MI: Merrill-Palmer School. Foreign Language Publications:

Chinese

- Moustakas, C. (1975). Ji mo yu ai [Loneliness and love]. Taibei Shi: Jing xiang chu ban she.

Dutch

- Moustakas, C. (1974). Liefde en eenzaamheid [Loneliness and love]. Rotterdam:Lemniscaat.
- Moustakas, C. (1973). Speltherapie: voor het gefrustreerde kind, het gestoorde kind, de gehandicapte [Psychotherapy with children]. Rotterdam: Lemniscaat.
- Moustakas, C. (1971). Creativiteit en conformisme [Creativity and conformity]. Rotterdam: Lemniscaat.
- Moustakas, C. (1976). Eenzaamheid [Loneliness]. Baarn: Ambo.

German

- Moustakas, C. (1984). Einsamkeit [Loneliness]. Düsseldorf: Patmos-Verlag.

Greek

- Moustakas, C. (1979). ΜΟΝΑΧΙΚΟΤΗΤΑ και ΑΓΑΠΗ [Loneliness and love]. [Greece?]: Ekdoseis Georgiadi.
- Monstakas, C. (1990). Monaxia: He empeiria tou na eisai monos [Loneliness]. [Athena]: Diodos. Rev. 11/11/2010 7

Italian

- Moustakas, C. (1969). Creativita e conformismo [Creativity and conformity]. Rome: Ubaldini.

Japanese

- Moustakas, C. (1997). Genshogakuteki shinri ryoho [Phenomenology, science and psychotherapy]. Kyoto: Mineruva Shobo.
- Moustakas, Clark E. (1992). Ningen sonzai no shinri ryoho [Rhythms, rituals and relationships]. Tokyo: Seishinryoho.
- Moustakas, Clark (1984). Ai to kodoku [Loneliness and Love]. Tokyo: Sogensha.
- Moustakas, Clark, (Ed.). (1980). Shishunki no jitsuzonteki kiki [Existential child therapy]. Tokyo: Iwasaki Gakujutsu Shuppansha.
- Moustakas, Clark. (1970). Kosei to deal. [Individuality and Encounter].
- Moustakas, C. (1968). Kodoku [Loneliness]. Tokyo: Iwasaki Gakujutsu Shuppansha.
- Moustakas, C. (1968). Jidoushinrigaku: suru anjuu ruienkankei. [Psychotherapy with Children: the Living Relationship]. Tokyo: Iwasaki Gakujutsu Shuppsha.
- Moustakas, C. (1968). Mondaiji no seicho to ningen kankei [The teacher and the child: Personal interaction in the classroom]. Tokyo: Iwasaki Gakujutsu Shuppansha.

Korean

- Moustakas, C. (1982). Inganjok songjang: Chongch`egam kwa ingan kach`i ui t`amgu [Personal growth]. Soul T`ukpyolsi: Ihwa Yoja Taehakkyo Ch`ulp`anbu.

Lithuanian

- Moustakas, C. (2008). Vienatve [Loneliness]. Kaunas: Zmogaus psichologijos studija.

Polish

- Moustakas, C. (2001). Fenomenologiczne metody badan [Phenomenological research Methods]. Bialystok: Trans Humana.

Portuguese

- Moustakas, C. (1994). Descobrindo o eu e o outro [Finding yourself, finding others]. Minas Gerais, Brazil: Belo Horizonte. Rev.

== See also ==
- Humanistic psychology
- Carl Rogers
- Abraham Maslow
