= Spiridon Peninsula =

Coordinates: 57°47′00″N 153°45′00″W

The Spiridon Peninsula is a mountainous peninsula on the northwest side of Kodiak Island, Alaska on the Shelikof Strait situated between Uganik Bay and Uyak Bay. Major promontories are Miners Point, Cape Ugat and Cape Kuliuk. Cape Ugat is the closest point on Kodiak Island to mainland Alaska.

Little River runs through the peninsula, and is a major salmon spawning site.

The peninsula is part of the Kodiak National Wildlife Refuge, and the refuge has a cabin on Little River that is available to guests.
