= Spyros Kastanas =

Cypriot footballer (born 1962)

Personal information
- Full name: Spyros Kastanas
- Date of birth: December 12, 1962 (age 63)
- Place of birth: Famagusta, Cyprus
- Position: Defender

Team information
- Current team: Omonia Aradippou (Head-coach)

Senior career*
Years	Team	Apps	(Gls)
1987–1989	Ethnikos Achna	58	(4)
1989–1996	Anorthosis Famagusta	150	(9)
1996–2002	Ethnikos Achna	66	(5)
Total		274	(18)

International career
	Cyprus	11	(0)

Managerial career
- 2004–2008: Ethnikos Achna (assistant manager)
- 2011–?: Omonia Aradippou
- * Club domestic league appearances and goals

Spiros Kastanas (Greek: Σπύρος Καστάνας) (born December 12, 1962) is a former international Cypriot football defender.

He started his career in 1987 from Ethnikos Achna. In 1989, he moved to Anorthosis Famagusta where he totally played for seven years. In 1996, he returned to Ethnikos Achna where he ended his career in 2000.
