= Cape Ugat =

Rocky point on Kodiak Island, Alaska, US

Coordinates: 57°52′12″N 153°50′53″W

Cape Ugat is a rocky point on the northwestern side of Kodiak Island, Alaska. It is the tip of the Spiridon Peninsula and protrudes into the Shelikof Strait. It is the closest point on Kodiak Island to mainland Alaska. In World War II Cape Ugat was occupied by US forces as a lookout station, the rationale being that it was the best vantage point to detect potential Japanese naval forces that could head up the Shelikof Strait towards the Cook Inlet and Anchorage, the logistical center of Alaska.

Cape Ugat waters are one of many excellent locations where Kodiak salmon fisherman repeatedly drop their nets and gear into the water, due to the dependable hard running tide that flows like a river four times a day, and the good bet that thousands of salmon are swimming right through the area heading to the Cook Inlet, or the many bays of Kodiak Island that lead to streams where salmon spawn. Major migratory routes for salmon pass immediately adjacent to the tip of Cape Ugat. The geographical shape of Cape Ugat offers shelter from hard Southwest gales, and many choose to weather off storms there and anchor.

Humpback whales and orcas are common; an occasional sperm whale or even blue whale can be seen in this vicinity. Dall's porpoises and false killer whales and the rare beluga have been seen too. The area is home to some of the larger breeding colonies of Steller sea lions on the Alaskan coast. Kodiak bears, sea otters, land otters, red foxes and bald eagles can be seen.

Cape Ugat and the Spiridon Peninsula is one of the most rugged parts of Kodiak Island. Winds can blow to 70 knots in the summer, and upwards of 110 in the winter. The winds usually blow either up the Shelikof Strait towards the Cook Inlet (a southwester) or down the straight towards the Aleutians and the Pacific Ocean (a nor'easter). In storms like these, coupled with rapid tides there is substantial danger.
