= ARA Spiro =

At least two ships of the Argentine Navy have been named Spiro:

- ARA Spiro (M-13), a Bouchard-class minesweeper commissioned in 1938 and decommissioned in 1962.
- ARA Spiro (P-43), an Espora-class corvette launched in 1983.
