= Michigan School of Psychology =

Private graduate school in Farmington Hills, Michigan, U.S.

Coordinates: 42.491482°N 83.359344°W

- Type: Private graduate school
- Established: 1980/81
- President: Dr. Frances Brown
- Postgraduates: 181 (Fall 2018)
- Location: Farmington Hills, Michigan, United States
- Website: msp.edu

The Michigan School of Psychology (MSP; formerly the Michigan School of Professional Psychology and the Center for Humanistic Studies) is a private graduate school for clinical psychology in Farmington Hills, Michigan, United States.

The school offers three programs of study: the Master of Arts (M.A.) in clinical psychology, which is offered in a one-year full-time or a two-year part-time format; the Doctor of Clinical Psychology (Psy.D.) degree, a full-time, minimum four-year, post-masters program; and a Certificate in Applied Behavior Analysis (ABA), a two-year certificate that can be completed concurrently with the MA program in clinical psychology.

== History ==
In 1980, Clark Moustakas founded the Center for Humanistic Studies in Detroit, Michigan, continuing a Masters-level psychology program which had been offered at the Merrill-Palmer Institute. In 2003, the campus moved to Farmington Hills, Michigan, and in 2006, on the occasion of its 25th anniversary, it changed its name to the Michigan School of Professional Psychology. In 2018, the school updated its mission statement and again changed its name to the Michigan School of Psychology. In 2021, the school opened a new building which houses the Michigan School Psychological Clinic.

== Curriculum ==
As a school founded in the humanistic tradition of psychology, the Michigan School of Psychology was created specifically to generate a learning climate that reflects the school's mission and its emphasis on growth and potential. Its classes encourage experiential learning and self-reflection as students develop their therapeutic skills and become culturally competent clinicians.

== Accreditation ==
The Michigan School of Psychology is accredited by the Higher Learning Commission and the American Psychological Association. The Behavior Analyst Certification Board has designated the courses in the Certificate in Applied Behavior Analysis as a Verified Course Sequence. It is approved by the State of Michigan Board of Education to grant graduate degrees in clinical psychology and is an associate member of the National Council of Schools and Programs of Professional Psychology.

== Campus ==
The Michigan School of Psychology is located in a wooded, four-acre campus in Farmington Hills, Michigan. The campus includes the Moustakas Johnson Library, Wilkinson Research Center, Joan S. Snyder Clinical Lab, a spacious atrium for gathering, and many spaces for reflection, such as the Diane Sklar Blau Sculpture Garden.

== Students ==
MA students enter the program with academic preparation in psychology - many also have related work experience. PsyD students enter the program with a graduate degree and have a background of study in psychology or related field. ABA students enter the program with a graduate degree and have a background of study in psychology, social work, or education or they can enter as part of the MA program with an ABA concentration

=== Student profile ===
Students for Fall 2018:

- 109 MA students
- 6 ABA Certificate students
- 66 PsyD students
- 77% Women
- 23% Men
- 0% International students
- 31% Students of color

== See also ==
- Humanistic Psychology
- Clark Moustakas
