= Joseph Moses Spiro =

Personal life
- Born: c. 1770 Trietsch, Moravia
- Died: 3 August 1830 Kanitz, Moravia

Religious life
- Religion: Judaism

Joseph Moses Spiro (Hebrew: משה יוסף הכהן שפירא; c. 1770–1830) was an Austrian rabbi and Talmudic author.

== Biography ==
Joseph Moses Spiro was born in Trietsch, Moravia, around the year 1770. He received his education from his father, Abraham, who served as a rabbi in that city. Though he facing health issues during his childhood, he became at an early age a Talmudic scholar of distinction. After initially serving as a dayyan in his hometown, he went on to become the rabbi in several other locations, including Schafa, Habern, and, finally, Kanitz, where he served from 1824 until his death.

Spiro was an early proponent of systematic instruction in religious literature and expressed strong criticism of the pilpul method. He edited the Sefer ha-ḥinnukh (Brünn, 1799), a work attributed to Aaron ha-Levi of Barcelona. He also wrote a book titled Mesillah le-Elokenu (Prague, 1810), consisting of three distinct parts: Derekh ha-yashar, on the evils of the unsystematic training for children; Berit Avraham, containing discussions on Halakha; and Revid ha-zahav, containing homilies.

== Publications ==
- Sefer ha-ḥinnukh. Brünn. 1799.
- Derekh ha-yashar. Prague: F. Gerjabeck. 1810.
- Berit Avraham. Prague. 1810.
- Revid ha-zahav. Prague. 1810.
