= Spyra =

Spyra is a surname. Notable people with the name include:

- Janusz Spyra (born 1958), Polish historian
- Wolfram Spyra (born 1964), German composer of ambient music

== See also ==
- Spira (disambiguation)
