= Spira =

Spira may refer to:

- Spira (car), a three-wheeled motor vehicle
- Spira (confectionery), a Cadbury chocolate bar in a helix shape
- Spira (name), including a list of people with the name
- Spira (Final Fantasy), the fictional world of the role-playing games Final Fantasy X and X-2
- Spira (footwear company), an American shoe manufacturer
- Speyer, medieval name Spira, a city in Germany

== See also ==
- Spiro (disambiguation)
- Spyra, a surname
- Spyro
- Spira mirabilis, the logarithmic spiral
