= Špiro =

Špiro is a masculine given name found in Montenegro and Croatia.

It may refer to:

- Špiro Grubišić (1904–1985), Croatian rower
- Špiro Guberina (1933–2020), Croatian and Yugoslav actor
- Špiro Kulišić (1908–1989), Montenegrin ethnologist
- Špiro Mugoša (1904–1942), Montenegrin Yugoslav Partisan
- Špiro Peričić (born 1993), Croatian football player

== See also ==
- Špirić
