= Spyros Moustakas =

Greek folklore writer

Spyros Moustakas (Greek: Σπύρος Μουστάκας, 1914–2002) was a writer of folklore books on Lemnos.

== Biography ==
Moustakas was born in Livadochori on the island of Lemnos in 1914. He was the only child of his parents, Panagiotis and Fanio. He attended the village's public school and Lemnos High School. He was later enrolled at the Zarifeio Children's Academy in Alexandroupoli and during that time, he was the head journalist of the Greek children's writer Evangelos Papanoutsos.

He worked as a teacher for four years in Samothrace and for five years in Lemnos. He also worked in Alexandroupoli at the Public School Inspection Office.

His most prolific publications were his textbooks, titled Lemnos Folklore Thesauros. He was able to publish four editions, which currently reside in the Karatzadeio Library in Myrina.

== Bibliography ==
- Laografik(o) thisavr(o)i this Limnou (Λαογραφικοί Θησαυροί της Λήμνου = Lemnos Folklore Thesaurus):
  - Volume I, Diptyho, Athens 1982
  - Volume II, Diptyho, Athens 1982
  - Volume IV, Halkida 1999
  - Volume V, Halkida 1999

His other manuscripts "books" (in the Karatzadeio Library in Myrina):

- Lemnos Folklore Thesaurus, Volumes II, VI to XXI
