= Sapira =

Sapira, Şapira and Šapira are variants of the Jewish Ashkenazi surname Shapiro.

Notable people with the surname include:

== Sapira ==
- Emmanuel Sapira (1900–1943), Romanian-born Belgian chess master
- Mircea Sapira, participant at 1937 World Table Tennis Championships – Men's team of Romania
- Sylvia Sapira, (1908–1981) American harpsichordist

== Șapira ==
- Avraham Șapira, deputy of Guttman Landau, president of the Chișinău Ghetto Committee

== Šapira ==
- Jankelis Šapira, member of the Vilnius Soviet of Workers Deputies, † 1919
- Judal Šapira, killed under Stalin (1937 mass execution of Belarusians)
- Chaimas Nachmanas Šapira or Haim Nachman Shapira (1895-1943), Semitologist and Zionist, lived mainly in Lithuania
- Leiba Šapira, member of the Lithuanian Central Bureau of the Young Communist League of Lithuania and Belorussia (1919-1920)
- Zalmenas Šapira, secretary of the communist Lithuanian People's Aid Union

== See also ==
- Shapiro, surname (article); variants:
  - Chapiro
  - Sapir (surname)
  - Sapiro
  - Schapira
  - Schapiro
  - Shapero
  - Shapira
  - Spear (surname)
  - Spero
  - Spira (surname)
  - Spiro (surname)
  - Szapiro
  - Szpiro
  - Spire – see André Spire
- Speyer, the German city which Sapira, Spero, etc. are based on
- Hakham Sapira Synagogue, Tunis
