= Shapiro =

Shapiro, and its variations such as Shapira, Schapiro, Schapira, Sapir, Sapira, Spira, Spiro, Sapiro, Szapiro/Szpiro in Polish and Chapiro in French (more at "See also"), is an Ashkenazi Jewish surname.

== Etymology ==
The surname is derived from Spira, the medieval name of Speyer in Germany; compare with Spire, the French name for that city. Other name variants based on the city name "Spira" include Spira, Spire, Spiro, Spear, Szpir, Szpiro, Spero, Sapir, Sapiro, Chapiro and Sprai. The Jewish community of Speyer was one of three leading cities central to the development of Ashkenazi culture, referred to as the ShUM-cities, an acronym based on the names of the cities of Speyer/Spira, Worms and Mainz. The family name Speyer (based on the modern German name for the same city) has also become a well-known surname that was spread by Jews from Frankfurt to England, the United States and Canada in the late 19th and early 20th century.

== Notable people surnamed Shapiro ==
- Adam Shapiro (disambiguation), several people
- Alan Shapiro (poet) (born 1952), American poet
- Alan Shapiro (education reformer), American education reformer
- Alan N. Shapiro (born 1956), American science fiction and media theorist
- Alex Shapiro, American composer
- Allen Shapiro, American investor
- Andrew H. Schapiro, American diplomat
- Anna D. Shapiro (born 1966), American theatre director
- Ari Shapiro, American reporter with National Public Radio
- Arnold Shapiro (born 1941), American television producer and writer
- Arnold S. Shapiro, American mathematician
- Arthur Shapiro (disambiguation), several people
- Ascher H. Shapiro, MIT professor and expert in fluid dynamics (1916–2004)
- Ben Shapiro (director), Peabody winning media expert and director.
- Ben Shapiro, American conservative political commentator
- Bernard Shapiro, Canadian academic, civil servant
- Beth Shapiro, evolutionary biologist
- Boris Shapiro, Russian-Swedish mathematician
- Boris Shapiro (poet), Russian-born German poet
- Cal Shapiro, vocalist, Timeflies
- Carl Shapiro, (born 1955) UC Berkeley economist and mathematician
- Carl J. Shapiro (1913–2021), Boston philanthropist
- Carol Harris-Shapiro, Reconstructionist rabbi
- Charles S. Shapiro, American diplomat
- Daniel B. Shapiro, U.S. ambassador to Israel
- David Shapiro (disambiguation), several people
- Dmitry Shapiro, entrepreneur, inventor, Googler
- Doug Shapiro (1959–2025), American racing cyclist
- Ehud Shapiro, Israeli computer scientist
- Florence Shapiro, American politician
- Francine Shapiro, American psychologist
- Fred R. Shapiro, American legal librarian and editor
- George Shapiro, American talent producer
- Gerald Shapiro (disambiguation), several people
- Harold S. Shapiro (1928–2021), mathematics professor
- Harold T. Shapiro, president of Princeton University
- Harvey Shapiro (disambiguation), several people
- Helen Shapiro, British singer
- Ian Shapiro, American political scientist
- Ilya Piatetski-Shapiro, mathematician (1929–2009)
- Irving Shapiro (1904–1931), one of the Shapiro Brothers, New York City labor racketeers
- Irving S. Shapiro, attorney, former CEO of Dupont
- Irwin Shapiro (1911–1981), American writer and translator
- Irwin I. Shapiro, astrophysicist
- J. David Shapiro, American filmmaker and stand-up comedian
- Jacob Shapiro, mobster
- James S. Shapiro (born 1955), American professor of English Literature
- Jeremy J. Shapiro, professor at Fielding Graduate University.
- Jesse Shapiro, American economist
- Jim Shapiro (attorney), attorney
- Jim Shapiro (drummer), American musician, drummer of Veruca Salt
- Joel Shapiro (1941–2025), American artist and sculptor
- Joel Shapiro (mathematician), American mathematician
- Jonathan Shapiro (born 1958), South African political cartoonist known as Zapiro
- Jordan Shapiro, American author and educator
- Joseph N. Shapiro (1887–1961), urologist, one of the founders of the urologic oncology in Russia
- Josh Shapiro (b. 1973), American lawyer and politician; Governor of Pennsylvania 2023-present
- Judith Shapiro, former president of Barnard College
- Judy Shapiro-Ikenberry (born 1942), American long-distance runner
- Justine Shapiro, Documentary Filmmaker and Globe Trekker host
- Karl Shapiro, United States poet
- Laurie Gwen Shapiro, American novelist and filmmaker
- Lee Shapiro (filmmaker), American film maker, killed by the Soviet military in Afghanistan
- Lee Shapiro (musician), American keyboardist, member of The Four Seasons and founder of The Hit Men
- Les Shapiro (1956–2022), American sports announcer
- Linda Hopkins Shapiro, better known as Tera Patrick, former American pornographic actress
- Lisa Shapiro (born 1967), American and Canadian philosopher
- Lori Shapiro (née Ferrara) (born 1973), American political official, wife of Josh
- Louis Shapiro (communist), American Communist Party organizer
- Louis Shapiro, Connecticut Supreme Court justice
- Marc B. Shapiro, professor of Judaic Studies at University of Scranton
- Mark Shapiro (disambiguation), several people
- Marla Shapiro, Canadian medical doctor, author and health journalist (print, television)
- Meir Shapiro, Orthodox rabbi
- Mel Shapiro (1935–2024), American theatre director, writer and academic
- Mendel Shapiro, Modern Orthodox rabbi
- Meyer Shapiro (1908–1931), one of the Shapiro Brothers, New York City labor racketeers
- Michael Shapiro (disambiguation), several people
- Milton Shapp (1912-1994), Governor of Pennsylvania (Born Milton Shapiro)
- Monte B. Shapiro (1912–2000), British clinical psychologist
- Mordechai Shapiro, American singer
- Nat Mayer Shapiro, American visual artist
- Neal Shapiro, president of PBS station Thirteen/WNET New York City.
- Neal Shapiro (equestrian) (born 1945), American equestrian and Olympic medalist
- Nevin Shapiro (born 1969), convicted American fraudster and central figure in the 2011 University of Miami athletics scandal
- Nina Gordon Shapiro, American singer
- Norma Levy Shapiro, United States federal judge
- Norman Shapiro (1932–2021), American mathematician and computer scientist
- Paul Shapiro (disambiguation), several people
- Peter Shapiro (disambiguation), several people
- Ralph Shapiro (1908–1974), New York politician
- Refael Shapiro, Orthodox rabbi
- Rick Shapiro, comedian and actor
- Robert Shapiro (disambiguation), several people
- Robert Schapire, computer scientist who co-invented AdaBoost, a widely used machine learning meta-algorithm.
- Roy D. Shapiro, Professor of Business Administration at the Harvard Business School
- Samantha Shapiro (born 1993), American gymnast
- Samantha Harris Shapiro, American TV host (Dancing with the Stars, Entertainment Tonight)
- Samuel Shapiro (disambiguation), several people
- Saul Shapiro, president of the Metropolitan Television Alliance, LLC (MTVA)
- Scott Shapiro, American political philosopher
- Seymour Shapiro, American chemist who pioneered development of pharmaceuticals for use against diabetes
- Sharon Shapiro, American gymnast
- Shmuel Shapiro (born 1974), French Chassidic-Jewish singer and Hazan.
- Sidney Shapiro, Chinese author and translator of American descent
- Stanley J. Shapiro, professor emeritus of Marketing at Simon Fraser University
- Stewart Shapiro, philosopher and logician
- Stuart Loren Shapiro, better known as Todd Loren (1960–1992), American publisher
- Stuart S. Shapiro, producer, writer, director, and Internet entrepreneur
- Sumner Shapiro, U.S. Navy Rear Admiral and former director of the Office of Naval Intelligence
- Susan Shapiro, American author and educator
- Ted Shapiro (1899–1980), U.S. popular music composer, pianist, and sheet music publisher
- Theodore Shapiro (psychiatrist), psychiatrist and psychoanalyst in New York
- Theodore Shapiro (composer), American composer
- Todd Shapiro, Canadian radio show host
- Victor L. Shapiro (1924–2013), American mathematician
- Walter Shapiro, American journalist and columnist
- William "Willie" Shapiro (1911–1934), one of the Shapiro Brothers, New York City labor racketeers

== Other uses ==
- "Miss Shapiro", a song by 801 from the album 801 Live
- Sally Shapiro, a Swedish musical group

== See also ==
- Variants:
  - Chapiro
  - Sapir (surname)
  - Sapira/Şapira/Šapira
  - Sapiro
  - Schapira
  - Schapiro
  - Shapero
  - Shapira
  - Spear (surname)
  - Spero
  - Speyer
  - Spira (family name)
  - Spire - see André Spire
  - Spiro (surname)
  - Szapiro
  - Szpiro
- Tristram Shapeero, English TV director
- Milton Shapp (born Shapiro; 1912–1994), US businessman, governor of Pennsylvania (1971–1979)
- Andre Shapps, former Big Audio Dynamite (BAD) keyboardist, brother of Grant Shapps
- Grant Shapps (born 1968), UK Secretary of State for Defence (2023–)
