= Shapira =

Shapira is a surname (see Shapiro), and may refer to:

- Amitzur Shapira, Israeli runner and track and field coach killed in the 1972 Munich massacre
- Amos Shapira, Israeli former President of El Al Airlines, Cellcom, and the University of Haifa
- Anita Shapira, Israeli historian
- Avraham Shapira, rabbi
- Benjamin Shapira, Israeli biochemist
- Berechiah Berak ben Isaac Eisik Shapira, 17th-century rabbi
- Dan Shapira, American physicist
- David Shapira, American businessman
- Haim-Moshe Shapira, Israeli politician
- Isaiah Meïr Kahana Shapira (1828–1887), Polish-German rabbi and author
- Moshe Shmuel Shapira, rabbi
- Moses Wilhelm Shapira (1830–1884), Jerusalem-based antiquities dealer
- Nimrod Shapira Bar-Or (born 1989), Israeli swimmer
- Omer Shapira (born 1994), Israeli racing cyclist
- Rachel Shapira, Israeli songwriter and poet
- Yitzhak Shapira, author of The King's Torah
- Yosef Shapira, Israeli judge and State Comptroller of Israel
- Shapira (Tel Aviv neighborhood)

== See also ==
- Shapiro, surname (main article); variants:
  - Chapiro, list
  - Sapir (surname), list
  - Sapiro, list
  - Schapira, list
  - Schapiro, list
  - Shapero, list
  - Spear (surname), list
  - Spero, list
  - Spira (surname), list
  - Spire - see André Spire
  - Spiro (surname), list
  - Szapiro, list
  - Szpiro, list
- Speyer, Germany city from which the name originates
