= Sapiro =

Sapiro is one variant of the Ashkenazi Jewish surname Shapiro. Notable people with the surname include:

- Aaron Sapiro (1884–1959), American cooperative activist and lawyer
- Evgeniy Sapiro (1934–2024), Soviet-Russian economist and politician
- Gisèle Sapiro (born 1965), French sociologist and historian
- Guillermo Sapiro (born 1966), Uruguayan computer scientist, electrical engineer, and professor
- Ilya Piatetski-Shapiro (1929–2009), Soviet-born Israeli mathematician
- Miriam Sapiro (born 1960), American politician
- Shireen Sapiro (born 1991), South African Paralympic swimmer
- Virginia Sapiro (born 1951), American political scientist and political psychologist

== See also ==
- Sapiro, a fictional kingdom in Encantadia, a Filipino fantasy franchise
- Speyer, a city in Germany
- Similar variants of the surname Shapiro:
  - Chapiro
  - Schapira
  - Schapiro
  - Shapero
  - Shapira
  - Spiro
  - Szapiro
  - Szpiro
