= Cyrano de Bergerac (disambiguation) =

Cyrano de Bergerac (1619–1655) was a French dramatist.

Cyrano de Bergerac may also refer to:

== Film and television ==
- Cyrano de Bergerac (1900 film), a French film starring Benoît-Constant Coquelin
- Cyrano de Bergerac (1925 film), a film starring Pierre Magnier
- Cyrano de Bergerac (1938 film), a TV film starring James Mason
- Cyrano de Bergerac (1946 film), a French film starring Claude Dauphin
- Cyrano de Bergerac (1950 film), a film starring José Ferrer
- Cyrano de Bergerac (1962 film), a TV film starring Christopher Plummer
- Cyrano de Bergerac (1974 film), a film starring Peter Donat
- Cyrano de Bergerac (1985 film), a film starring Derek Jacobi
- Cyrano de Bergerac (1990 film), a French film starring Gérard Depardieu
- Cyrano de Bergerac (2008 film), a film starring Kevin Kline
- Cyrano (2021 film), an American-British musical drama directed by Joe Wright
- Cyrano De Bergerac (sketch), a "play" in the 1977 final episode of the BBC series The Morecambe & Wise Show

== Stage ==
- Cyrano de Bergerac (play), an 1897 play based upon de Bergerac's life by Edmond Rostand
- Cyrano de Bergerac (Herbert), an 1899 Broadway musical comedy/operetta with music by Victor Herbert
- Cyrano de Bergerac, a 1905 concert overture by Johan Wagenaar
- Cyrano (Damrosch), a 1913 opera by Walter Damrosch, based on the play
- Cyrano de Bergerac (Alfano), a 1936 opera by Franco Alfano
- Cyrano de Bergerac (Tamberg), a 1976 opera by Eino Tamberg
- Cyrano de Bergerac (musical), a 2009 musical by Frank Wildhorn and Leslie Bricusse

== See also ==
- Bergerac (disambiguation)
- Cyrano (disambiguation)
- List of film adaptations of Cyrano de Bergerac
