= Edward Grebow =

American businessman

Edward Grebow was the president and CEO of Amalgamated Bank from 2011 to 2013. He is currently the Managing Director of Lakewood Advisors, which specializes in advising financial firms, media technology companies and nonprofit organizations.

From 2007 to 2010, Grebow was managing director at J.C. Flowers & Co. Grebow was retained to oversee J.C. Flowers & Co.’s 25 billion dollar acquisition of Sallie Mae.

From 2002 to 2003, Grebow served as the president of the Metropolitan Television Alliance (MTVA), a consortium of 11 New York area broadcasters. As President, Grebow directed the negotiations with public and private entities to replace the broadcast towers atop the World Trade Center that were destroyed on September 11, 2001.

From 2003 to 2006 Grebow was the president of ULLICO, where he implemented a business plan to restore ULLICO's financial strength rating, as well as rebuilding its position as a financial services company for labor unions and their pension plans.

== Career ==
Edward Grebow began his career at Morgan Guaranty Trust Company as an accountant. In 1985, he was named Executive Vice President and COO of Bowery Savings Bank. In this role, Mr. Grebow worked with investors including Richard Ravitch, Warren Buffett and Laurence Tisch to develop an acquisition plan for the troubled bank. After the implementation of several cost-saving measures that returned the bank to profitability, Bowery was sold to H.F. Ahmanson & Co. for $200 million in 1987.

In 1988, Mr. Grebow became Executive Vice President of CBS Inc., where he oversaw the purchase and renovation of the historic Ed Sullivan Theater as a home for Late Show with David Letterman. Purchased for $4 million, initial work at the building revealed challenges that many industry insiders doubted he could overcome, but the project was completed in 12 weeks. Upon completion, the CBS-owned theater and adjacent building boasted state-of-the-art production and office spaces that also became home to the New York City Mayor's Office of Film, Theatre & Broadcasting.

In 1995, Mr. Grebow was named President of Tele-TV Systems, a joint venture among three regional telephone companies that were attempting to develop interactive television services. In this role, he testified before the Federal Communications Commission on issues surrounding advanced television systems and the allotment of spectrum for digital television broadcasting. Following this position, Mr. Grebow joined Chyron Corporation, a leading television production equipment maker, as president, and saw this entity through a period of prosperity in 1997.

Beginning in 1999, Mr. Grebow led Sony Broadcast and Professional Company through the broadcasting industry's transition from traditional to digital technology and oversaw the company's partnership with Panavision Inc. to bring high-quality digital cameras to leading filmmakers around the world.

After the tragedy of September 11, 2001, Mr. Grebow stepped down from his role at Sony when he was asked to head the Metropolitan Television Alliance, the organization of New York City broadcasters that was responsible for replacing the broadcast and emergency services transmission facilities that were destroyed in the attack. Mr. Grebow worked to organize alternative means of broadcasting, while a permanent site for a new tower was found and constructed. After consideration of locations in New Jersey and on Governors Island in New York Harbor, Mr. Grebow signed an agreement in 2003 to install 22 analog and digital antennas on the new Freedom Tower at the World Trade Center site.

In 2003, Mr. Grebow joined Ullico, a Washington, DC–based, labor union-affiliated financial services and insurance company, as president. Dealing with fallout from several years of financial abuses and criminal activity by former executives and directors, he organized an infusion of capital, sold the company's headquarters, and led a management overhaul that restored the company's financial strength and reputation in a short time. His work at Ullico earned him distinction as a "turnaround specialist for financial services and labor-focused companies." Following this success, Mr. Grebow joined the private equity firm J.C. Flowers & Co. as Managing Director in 2007 and was retained to oversee a transaction that attempted to privatize student loan giant Sallie Mae.

Union-owned Amalgamated Bank was suffering from deficits that resulted from failed real estate loans and was under threat of closure by the FDIC when Mr. Grebow was hired as president and CEO in 2011. He was able to raise $100 million in capital for the bank from billionaire investors Wilbur Ross and Ron Burkle and oversaw the development of innovative retail banking products. Under Mr. Grebow's leadership, Amalgamated served as the bank of the Democratic National Committee, the Presidential Inaugural Committee of 2013 and the "unofficial financial institution" of the Occupy Wall Street movement. On several occasions throughout Mr. Grebow's tenure, Amalgamated brought derivative lawsuits against corporations on behalf of its many pension fund clients, securing its reputation as a bank that would stand against corporate wrongdoing.

With Amalgamated Bank's stability restored in 2013, Mr. Grebow returned to investment banking as Managing Director of TriArtisan Capital Partners. In 2018, he established a new firm, Lakewood Advisors, which provides consulting services to financial institutions, media technology firms, financial technology companies and nonprofit organizations.

== Current Trustee and Board Positions ==
Grebow serves on the boards of directors of Diamond Offshore Drilling, Inc, where he is the chairman of the Audit Committee, and Xenith Bankshares, where he represents the Anchorage Capital Group. He joined the Board of Directors of Alcentra Capital Corporation in 2016 and was appointed Chairman in 2019. Grebow is a trustee of New York City's public television station Thirteen/WNET, the Laborers International Union Charitable Foundation and the International Association of Fire Fighters Foundation.

Grebow's past board positions include:

- The George Washington University
- American Film Institute
- Theatre Development Fund
- Panavision, Inc.

== Education ==
Grebow graduated from the George Washington University School of Business.

== Awards ==
In 2013, The Emerald Isle Society awarded Grebow the Robert Briscoe award, which is given annually to members of New York's Jewish community in recognition of their efforts to better the lives of Irish immigrants.

WNET's Board of Trustees named Grebow a Life Trustee in 2018.
