= Adam Shapiro =

Adam Shapiro is the name of:

== People ==
- Adam Shapiro (activist) (born 1972), American co-founder of the International Solidarity Movement (ISM)
- Adam Shapiro (television reporter), American television reporter and investigative journalist
- Adam Shapiro (actor), American actor
- Adam Shapiro, American actor in The Den (2013 film)
- Adam Shapiro, American film producer of Incubus (2006 film)

== Characters ==
- Adam Shapiro (character), recurring character on The Bear TV series

== See also ==
- Shapiro
