= Michael Shapiro =

Michael Shapiro may refer to:

- Michael Shapiro (actor) (born 1965), American actor, voice actor and theatre director
- Mike Shapiro (programmer), American computer programmer
- Michael J. Shapiro (born 1940), American political scientist at the University of Hawai'i
- Michael Jeffrey Shapiro, American composer and music director of the Chappaqua Orchestra
- Michael Shapiro (journalist) (1910–1986), British journalist and translator
- Mike Shapiro, bookmaker, see Sands Hotel and Casino

== See also ==
- Mikhail Chapiro (born 1938), Russian artist and painter, currently lives in Canada
