= John R. Zagame =

American politician

Member of the New York State Assembly from the 117th district
- In office January 1, 1975 – December 31, 1980
- Preceded by: Ralph Shapiro
- Succeeded by: Ray T. Chesbro

Personal details
- Born: July 27, 1951 (age 74)
- Party: Republican

John R. Zagame (born July 27, 1951) is an American politician who served in the New York State Assembly from the 117th district from 1975 to 1980. In September 1974, he had won the Republican primary election for the 117th District Assemblyman.
