= Cyrano =

Cyrano may refer to:

== Astronomy ==
- 3582 Cyrano, a small main belt asteroid
- Cyrano (crater), a lunar impact crater that lies on the far side of the Moon

== Stage and film ==
- Cyrano (Damrosch), a 1913 opera by Walter Damrosch
- Cyrano (musical), a 1973 musical with music by Michael J. Lewis, libretto and lyrics by Anthony Burgess
- Cyrano: The Musical, a 1991 Dutch musical by Ad van Dijk
- Cyrano (opera), a 2007 opera by David DiChiera
- Cyrano (film), a 2021 American-British film adaptation of a musical by Erica Schmidt
- Cyrano, a 1958 musical by David Shire and Richard Maltby, Jr.

== Other uses ==
- Cyrano (insect) a damselfly genus of the family Chlorocyphidae
- Cyrano radar family, a family of radars for the Dassault Mirage fighter aircraft
- Cyrano, a stage name of Kshmr as a member of the record production team the Cataracs

== See also ==
- Cyrano de Bergerac (disambiguation)
- Cyrano Agency, a 2010 Korean film
- Cyrano Jones, a Star Trek character who deals in tribbles
- Cyranoid, a person who is instructed by radio as to what to say
