= Spira (name) =

Spira is a surname with a variety of origins. In Germany, the surname Spira is a form of Speyer, the name of a town in the Rhineland.

The surname found particular historical significance among the Jewish communities of Central and Eastern Europe, with many notable Rabbis claiming this name. The Spira family directly descends from 11th century rabbi Rashi, and therefore is in the Davidic line. Additionally, the Baal Shem Tov, the founder of Hassidic Judaism, is said to have claimed that the Spira family is one of three pure lineages of among the Jewish nation (being Israelites), the others being the Horowitz family (who are Levites) and the Rappaport family (who are Kohanim).

Other forms of the name include Spiro, Shapira, and Shapiro.

Notable people with this name include:

== Surname ==
- Tzvi Elimelech Spira of Dinov (1783-1841), Bnei Yissachar rabbi
- Camilla Spira (1906–1997), German film actress
- Chaim Elazar Spira (1868–1937), Polish Orthodox rabbi
- Elijah Spira (1660–1712), Czech rabbi
- Ella Spira, English composer
- Fred Spira (1924–2007), American photography innovator
- Fritz Spira (1881–1943), Austrian actor
- Harry Spira (died c. 2009), Australian veterinarian
- Henry Spira (1927–1988), animal rights activist
- Howard Spira (born 1959), American gambler and mobster
- Joel Spira (born 1981), Swedish actor
- Joel Spira (businessman) (1927–2015), American inventor and businessman
- Jonathan Spira (born 1961), American researcher and industry analyst
- Julie Spira, American author and media personality
- Lotte Spira (1883–1943), German actress
- Michael Spira (born 1944), British medical doctor
- Nathan Nata Spira (1585–1633), Polish rabbi and kabbalist
- Phyllis Spira (1943–2008), South African ballet dancer
- Rupert Spira (born 1960), English studio potter
- Steffie Spira (1908–1995), Austrian-born German actress
- Thomas Spira (1923–2005), Canadian historian
- Yisroel Spira (1889–1989), Polish-American rabbi

== Given name ==
- Spira Grujić (born 1971), Serbian football defender

== See also ==
- Spyra
- Spera
- Spiro (name)
- Spira (car)
- Spira Culture Center
- Shapiro, main article on Ashkenazi surname having Spira as a variant
- Jewish surname
