= Mark Shapiro =

Mark Shapiro may refer to:

- Mark Shapiro (media executive), American media executive
- Mark Shapiro (sports executive) (born 1967), American baseball executive
- Mark H. Shapiro (born 1940), emeritus professor of physics at California State University, Fullerton
- Marc B. Shapiro (born 1966), professor of Judaic Studies at University of Scranton
