= Sapir =

Sapir, meaning sapphire or lapis lazuli in Hebrew, may refer to:

- Sapir (surname), a list of people with the surname
- Sapir, Israel, moshav in Israel
- SAPIR: A Journal of Jewish Conversations, quarterly magazine about American Jewish identity, culture, and ideas

== See also ==
- Sapir Academic College
- Sapir Prize
