= Benjamin Shapira =

Israeli biochemist

- בנימין שפירא
- Born: 10 June 1913; Germany
- Died: 1993 (aged 79–80)
- Occupation: Biochemist
- Awards: Israel Prize (1955)
- Scientific career
- Education: Hebrew University of Jerusalem
- Fields: Biochemistry

Benjamin Shapira (Hebrew: בנימין שפירא; 10 June 1913 – 30 October 1993) was an Israeli biochemist.

== Biography ==
Benjamin Shapira was born in Germany in 1913. His family immigrated to British Mandate of Palestine in 1926 and settled in Afula. He studied at the Hebrew University of Jerusalem from 1933 and obtained a BSc in natural sciences in 1937. In 1940, he was awarded a PhD.

== Awards ==
- In 1955, Shapira was awarded the Israel Prize, for medical science.

== See also ==
- List of Israel Prize recipients
- Shapira
