= Spera (disambiguation) =

Spera is a frazione of the comune of Castel Ivano in northern Italy.

Spera may also refer to:

== Places ==
- Spera, Khost Province, Afghanistan
  - Spera District

== People with the surname ==
- Benedetto Spera (born 1934), Sicilian mafioso
- Danielle Spera (born 1957), Austrian journalist
- Deborah Spera, American television producer
- Gabriel Spera, American poet
