= Jewish Museum Vienna =

Museum of Jewish history, life and religion in Austria

Coordinates: 48°12′26″N 16°22′08″E

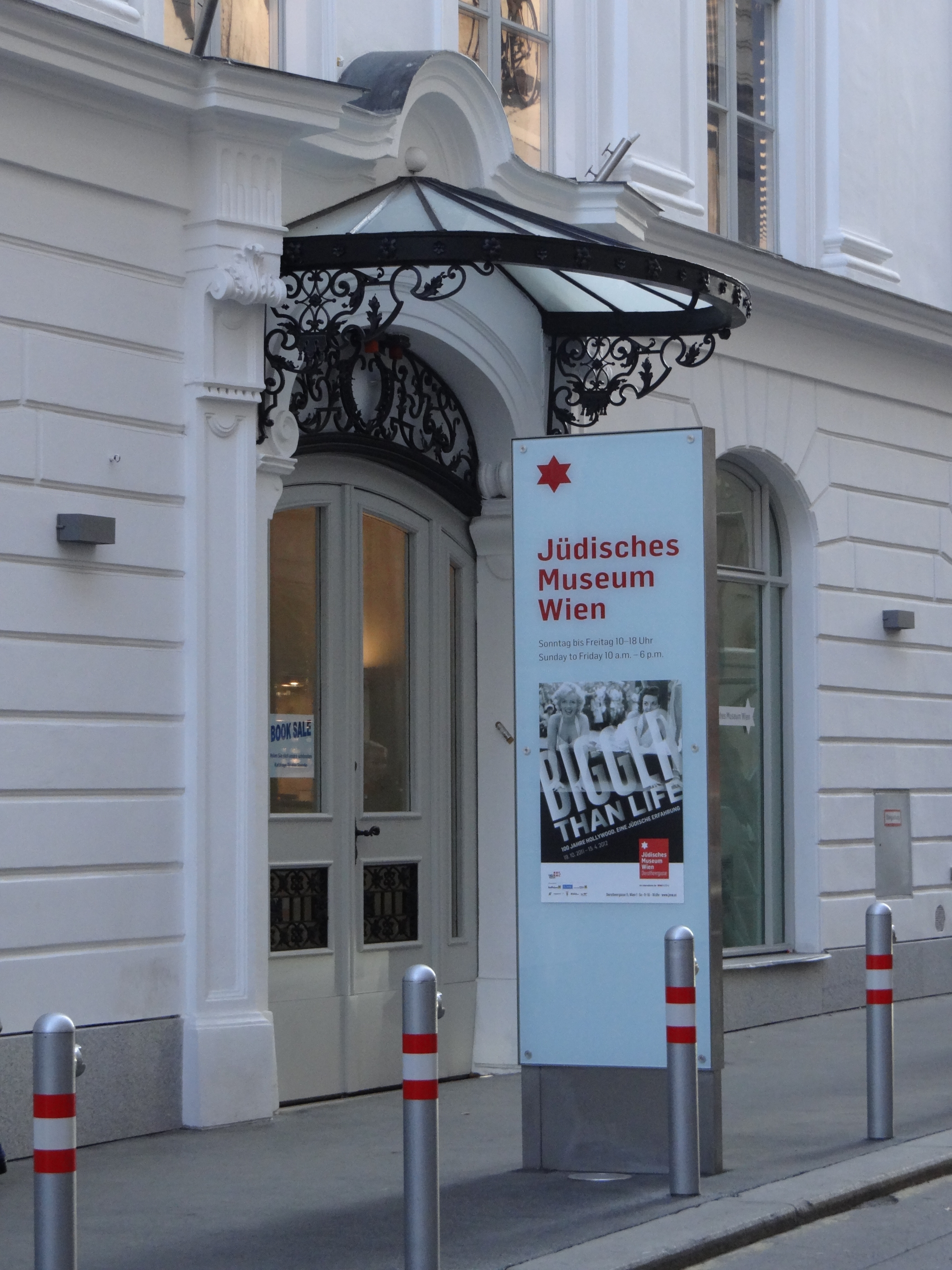
Jüdisches Museum Wien in the Palais Eskeles

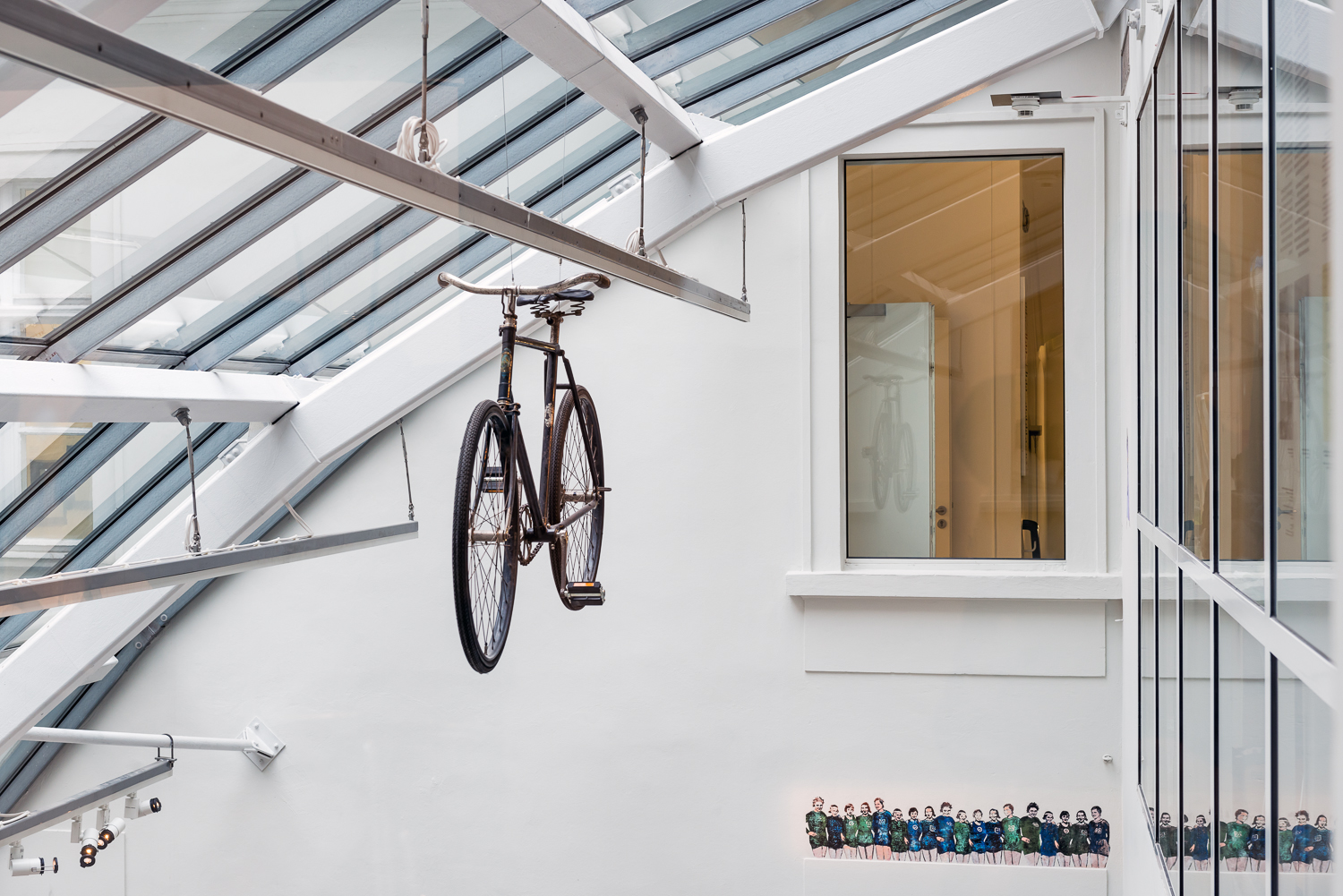
Theodor Herzl's bicycle

The Jüdisches Museum Wien, trading as Jüdisches Museum der Stadt Wien GmbH or the Jewish Museum Vienna, is a museum of Jewish history, life and religion in Austria. The museum is present on two locations, in the Palais Eskeles in the Dorotheergasse and in the Judenplatz, and has distinguished itself by a very active programme of exhibitions and outreach events highlighting the past and present of Jewish culture in Austria. The current director is Barbara Staudinger and the chief curator is Hannes Sulzenbacher.

== History ==
The first Jewish Museum in Vienna, founded in 1893 and opened 1895, was the first Jewish museum in the world of its sort. It was supported and run by the "Society for the Collection and Preservation of Artistic and Historical Memorials of Jewry". The museum focused on the culture and history of the Jews in the Austro-Hungarian Empire, especially in Vienna and Galicia, while its collection of objects from the British Mandate of Palestine also reflected the political debate about Zionism at that time.

By 1913, when it moved into the Talmud-Thora-School in Leopoldstadt with 3,400 objects, it had already moved premises several times. Immediately after the Anschluss by Nazi Germany in 1938 the museum was closed, and its contents were distributed among the Museum of Ethnology (Museum für Völkerkunde), the Natural History Museum (Naturhistorisches Museum Wien) and other repositories. The Natural History Museum used its new acquisitions to mount the anti-Semitic exhibition "The Corporeal and Spiritual Properties of the Jews". At the beginning of the 1950s, the majority of that stock was restituted to the Jewish community (Israelitische Kultusgemeinde Wien), with some additional objects being returned in the 1990s.

On 31 December 1964 a small Jewish museum was opened in the newly built Desider-Friedmann-Hof in Tempelgasse 3, but received scarcely any public attention. It closed for renovation work in 1967 and was never reopened.

In 1986 the establishment of a new Jewish museum in Vienna was announced by the then mayor of Vienna, Helmut Zilk, in New York at the opening of the exhibition "Vienna 1900 - Art, Architecture and Design". On the foundation committee, among many others, were representatives of the Austrian state, the city of Vienna, the Jewish Community in Vienna, the Vienna Philharmonic, Leonard Bernstein and Helmut Zilk.

After its foundation in 1988 as a limited company under the management of director Christian Cap the museum was given the management of the Max Berger Collection and the IKG Collection. In 1993 Austrian collector Martin Schlaff presented to the city of Vienna his collection of antisemitica, containing about 5,000 objects, and covering a period from 1490 to 1946, so that they could be catalogued and prepared for a major exhibition.

== Palais Eskeles ==
In 1993 the Palais Eskeles in the Dorotheergasse in Vienna was put at the disposal of the museum by the auction house Dorotheum. Julius H. Schoeps, director of the Moses Mendelssohn Zentrum für europäisch-jüdische Studien at the University of Potsdam, was appointed director. On 24 November 1994 Paul Grosz, president of the Israelitische Kultusgemeinde Wien, opened the museum library. In 1995/1996 the Palais Eskeles adapted for the museum by the Viennese team of architects eichinger oder knechtl to create more display spaces, increase storage, and add a coffee house and a specialist bookshop. In 1998, the museum archive with an ever-growing collection of materials on the history of Jewish Vienna was publicly available. On 25 October 2000, the second building of the museum was opened in Judenplatz with the unveiling of the Judenplatz Holocaust Memorial to the Austrian Jews who were murdered in the Holocaust.

== Museum Judenplatz ==
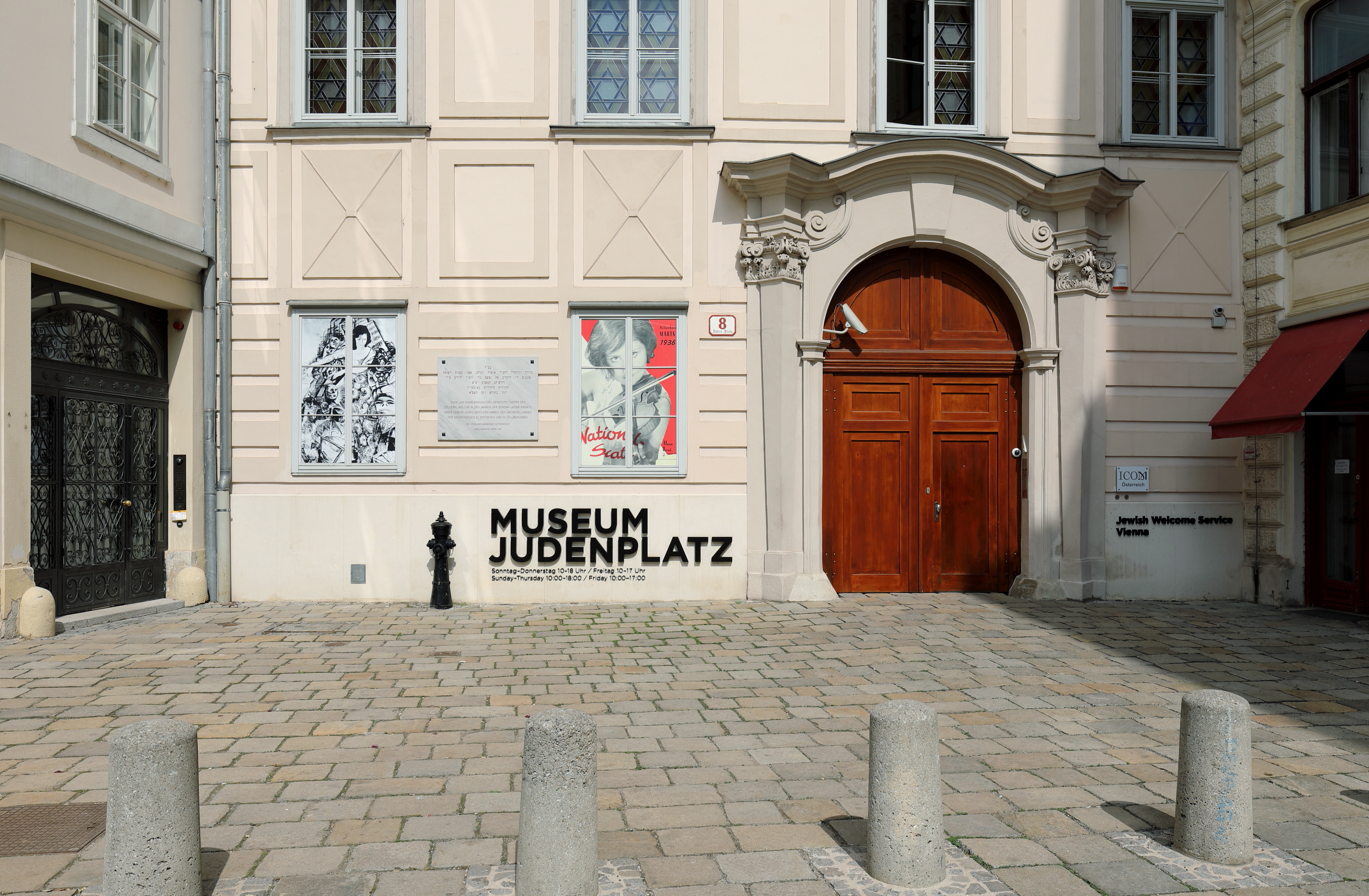
Jewish Museum Vienna at Judenplatz

The second location of the Jewish Museum Vienna documenting the social, cultural and religious lives of Viennese Jews in the Middle Ages is housed in the Misrachi House, on the Judenplatz, the heartland of the city's medieval Jewish community. The exhibition space, opened on 25 October 2000, is smaller than Dorotheergasse, and thoroughly modern in construction, with ample light, polished concrete features and underground corridors that lead the visitor all the way down to 4.5 meters below street level, to the underlying foundations of the medieval synagogue. In recent years, the Judenplatz museum has hosted contemporary art exhibitions with a spiritual or specifically Jewish theme, such as installations by notable Austrian artist Zenita Komad, the 100th birthday of Leonard Bernstein and several photography exhibitions.

Under the scientific leadership of Staudinger and Sulzenbacher, who assumed their roles in 2022, the evolving exhibition spaces at Judenplatz are designed to link the memorial with the remains of the destroyed medieval synagogue. The exhibitions seek to incorporate broad themes—such as guild, peace, theft, and fear—into a coherent narrative within a limited physical space, creating a context that encourages reflection on both historical and contemporary issues.

== Renovation ==
In November 2009, ORF journalist Danielle Spera was selected to take over the management of the museum as of July 2010. In interviews around the time of her appointment, the new director of the museum said she aimed to "open up" the museum to the public, to create a space where fears and prejudices were dispelled and non-Jews could experience both the traumatic past and the vibrant present of the Austrian Jewish community. Specific goals also included reaching out to young people with targeted projects for schools, and to tourists.

"Much has normalised. But there are still many people who have difficulty with it, uttering the word 'Jew', they say 'our Jewish fellow citizens'. I want to open the museum up so people get to know Judaism better," Spera said in an interview.

To accommodate the new direction of the museum, Spera made the immediate renovation of the Dorotheergasse premises a priority, launching an intensive fundraising effort both from official sources in Austria and from the Jewish diaspora especially in the United States. The renovation, between January and October 2011 aimed at a complete technical overhaul of the museum infrastructure as well as to changes in layout and visitor facilities.

== Holograms controversy ==
During the renovation project, a set of glass holograms showing 3D depictions of old Viennese life was broken on its removal from the museum. A museum employee took pictures and sent them to curator blogs and the local media, creating a furore about what critics said was the destruction of cultural artifacts. The museum responded with a report from a court-certified expert who testified the holograms could not have been unmounted without damage as they had been glued together almost 15 years prior. The museum added that a second set of the same holograms, that had not been on display, was still intact and would be placed in storage for future use.

== Reopening ==
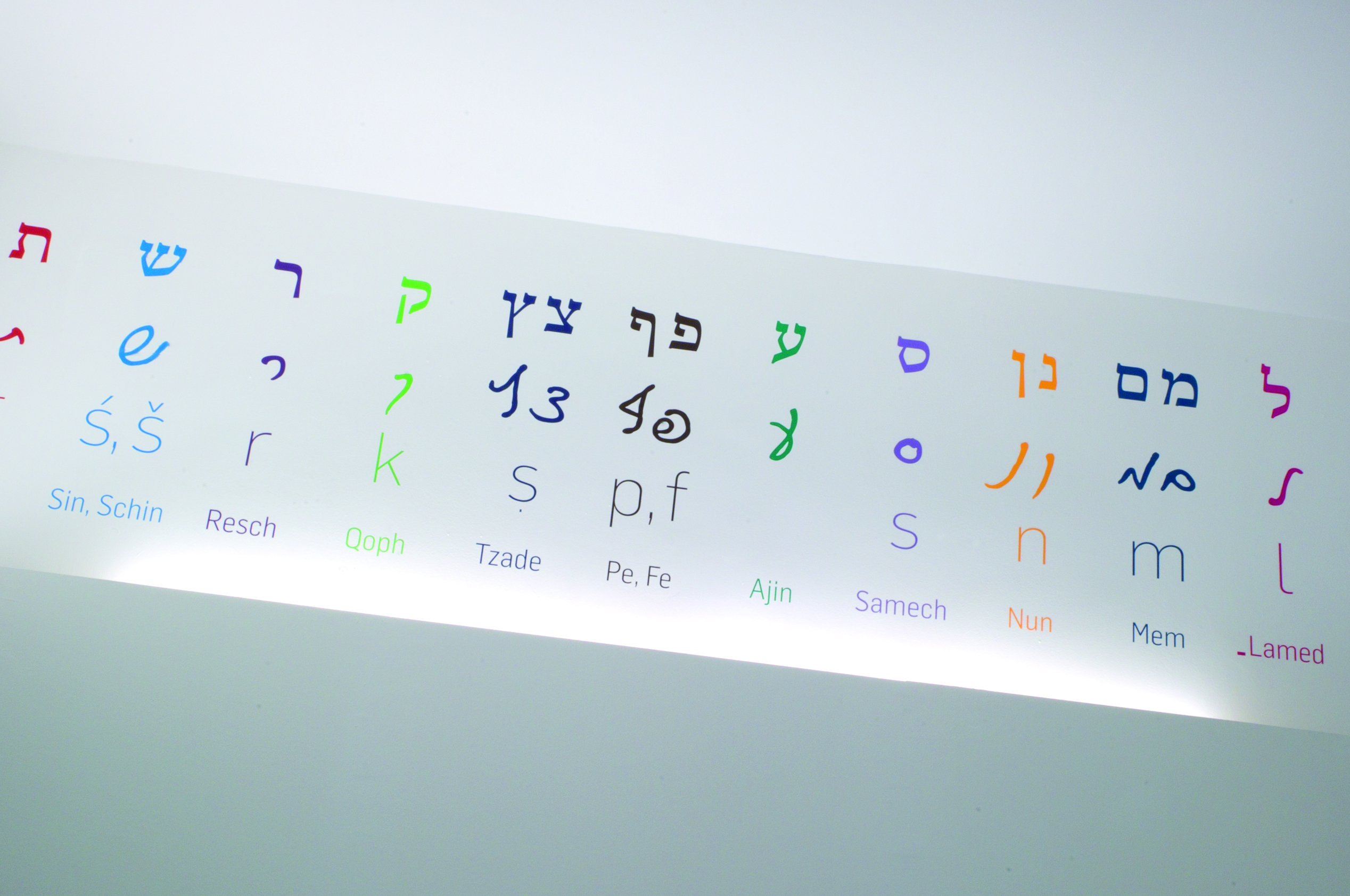
From Aleph to Tav

On 19 October 2011 the museum opened to great public interest in the new premises, while the temporary exhibition "Bigger than life - 100 years of Hollywood" that focused on Jewish Austrian contribution to the U.S. film industry, was described as a real crowd puller. As part of the renovation, the museum's facade was refreshed and the building's purpose made more prominent with a large light installation by Austrian artist Brigitte Kowanz of the word museum in Hebrew script. On the ground floor, the remodeling created a roomy and light foyer area and a spacious showroom hosting the "Vienna. Jewish Museum. 21st Century" permanent exhibition as well as the "Nancy Spero - Installation of Memory" murals. A big event space was created in the second floor and a small exhibition, "From Aleph to Tav - From the beginning to the end", showcases the Jewish life cycle through museum items and everyday objects.

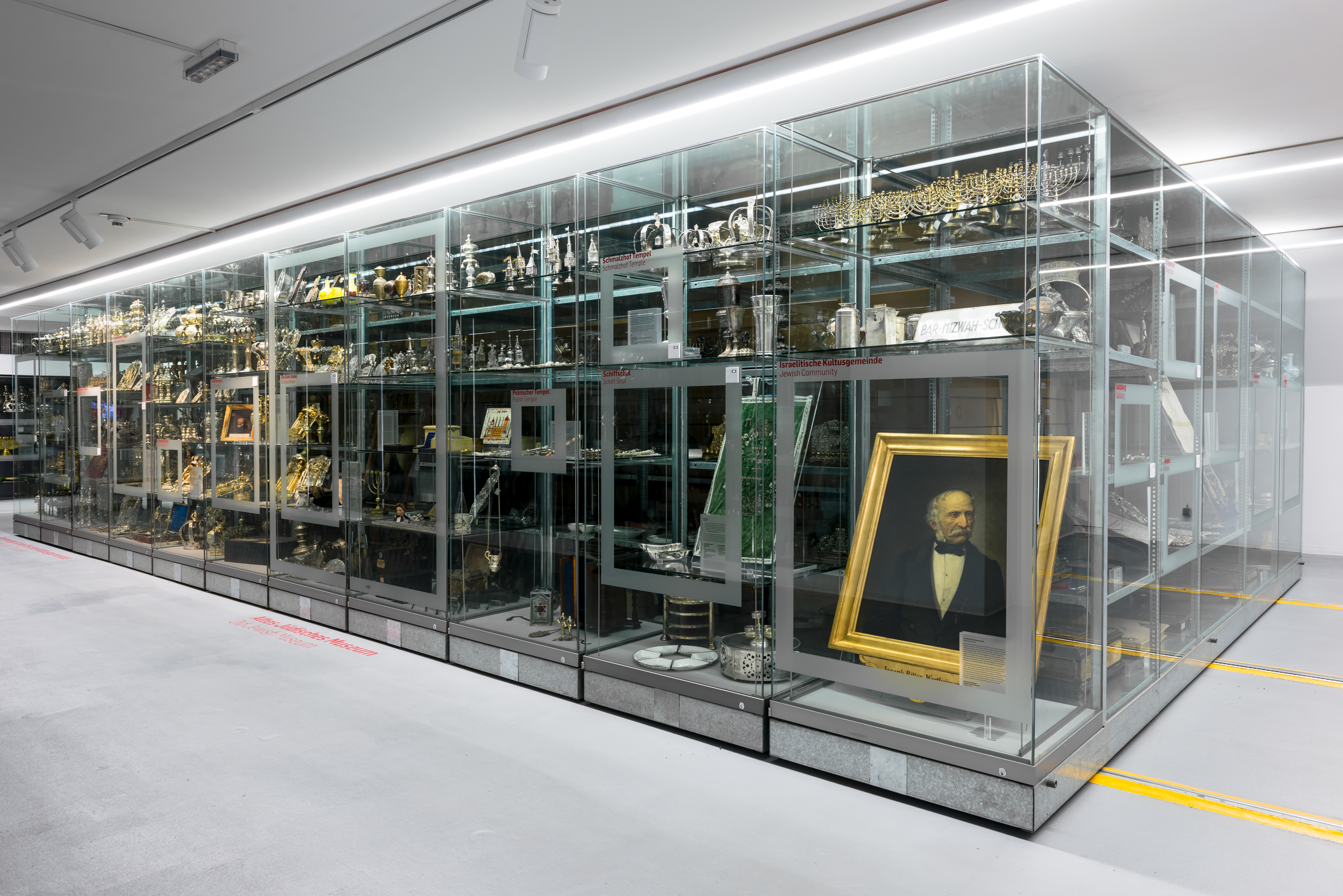
The Visible Storage

As part of the renovation, the Visible Storage area ("Schaudepot") in the third floor was completely redesigned to house the museum's Judaica collection. Individual objects are highlighted and explained through an installation of "windows" in the glass display cases, each window corresponding to a location, such as the "Leopoldstadt Temple" in Vienna. The central display features objects of Viennese and Austrian prayer houses, synagogues and other Jewish institutions, from the Jewish Museum before 1938, and to a small extent also from private households. The displays on the side cases focus of the period after 1945 : they include objects of the Max Berger Collection of Austro-Hungarian Judaica, the Eli Stern collection that is mainly made up of everyday objects from Eretz Yisrael, and the new acquisitions and donations that trace the history of Vienna's Jewish community from 1945 to now. The Martin Schlaff "Antisemitic objects" collection, also housed on the third floor, is shown facing to the back of each display case, which is mirrored—the idea being that to look at the mirrored objects, the visitor must at the same time come face to face with their own reflection.

== Visitor numbers ==
Since its re-opening, the museum has attracted record number of visitors, both to its regular exhibitions and to its evening program of events featuring visiting artists and film projections. Specifically, the Judenplatz location posted doubling of its visitor numbers year on year (28,000 visitors in 2011 vs 14,000 in 2010) while the attendance to its evening events program tripled. Visitor figures over both locations reached 59,471 in 2011, and posted a strong start in 2012, with 22,000 visitors recorded in the first quarter alone. The museum is currently in the Top 30 of Viennese attractions with 133,000 visitors in 2018.

== Our City! Jewish Vienna - Then to Now ==
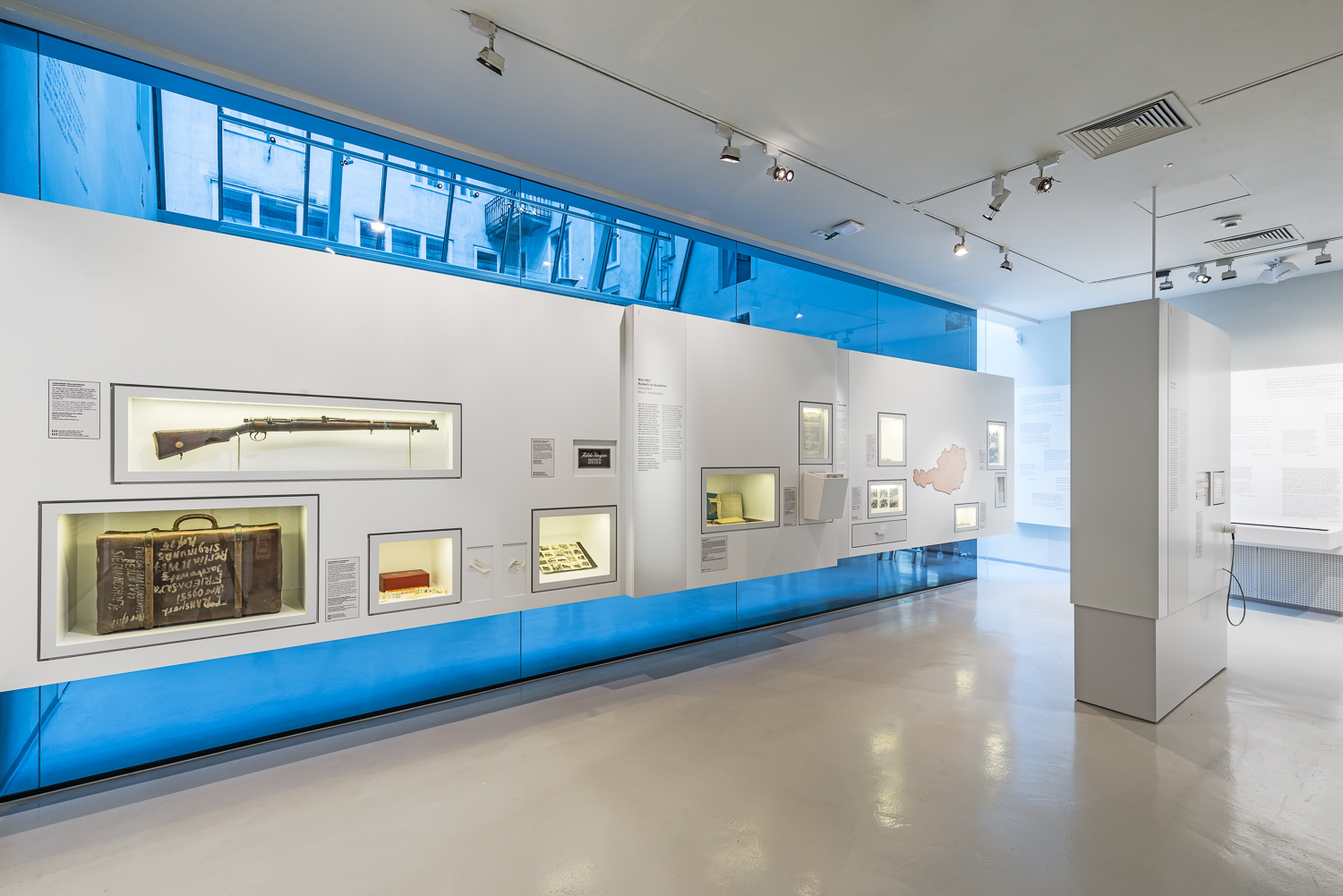
Exhibition "Our City!" on the ground floor

After three years of preparation, the museum launched its new permanent exhibition “Our City! Jewish Vienna –Then to now” in November 2013. The exhibition tracks the history of Vienna's Jews as a key part of the cultural, financial and emotional life of the Austrian capital for centuries, but with particular emphasis on the years from 1945 to the present day, and the slow but steady flourishing of the decimated community.

== Sources ==
- Jüdisches Museum Wien website (in German and English)
