= Distributed transmission system =

Form of single-frequency network

In North American digital terrestrial television broadcasting, a distributed transmission system (DTS or DTx) is a form of single-frequency network in which a single broadcast signal is fed via microwave, landline, or communications satellite to multiple synchronized terrestrial radio transmitter sites. The signal is then simultaneously broadcast on the same frequency in different overlapping portions of the same coverage area, effectively combining many small transmitters to generate a broadcast area rivaling that of one large transmitter or to fill gaps in coverage due to terrain or localized obstacles.

== History ==
While the idea of a single-frequency network of multiple transmitters broadcasting the same programming on the same channel from multiple transmitter sites is not a new concept, the ATSC digital television standard in use in North America was not designed for this mode of operation and was poorly adapted to these applications. The restrictive timing requirements and poor multipath interference handling of early ATSC implementations would have precluded multiple synchronous transmitters on the same frequency at the time of the first wide-scale commercial ATSC deployment in 1998; these restrictions eased somewhat as receiver design advanced in subsequent years. By 2004, technology existed to provide digital television receivers with the means to detect static (not mobile or changing) multipath interference (subject to certain timing constraints) and compensate for its effects on the digital signal.

Tests have been run by various individual broadcasters or broadcast groups, including the Metropolitan Television Alliance (MTVA, a consortium of New York City television stations). A series of initial tests involving four distributed transmission sites and over 100 test measurement sites in NYC and New Jersey were completed in June 2008, along with smaller-scale tests in New York in 2007. The New York market is uniquely problematic for multipath reception due to the large number of man-made obstacles which prevent adequate digital coverage of the entire city from the main broadcast facilities atop the Empire State Building.

== Technical issues ==
To the receiver, a signal from a single-frequency network appears as a single broadcast with strong multipath interference; in the worst case, it is detected as a main signal and a reflection both of equal strength as signals arrive from multiple transmitters to the same intermediate location at slightly different times.

The ATSC standard used for digital television in North America, unlike the DVB-T standard in Europe and other nations, uses 8VSB instead of OFDM—a modulation which allowed a station to transmit at lower peak power levels, but which historically has been far inferior in handling multipath reflections and RF interference.

The first widespread commercial deployment of US ATSC digital television began in 1998, with the first early adopters being stations in the largest markets (including New York City, served by transmitters atop the World Trade Center). Digital receivers of this era, while expensive, were poorly equipped to deal with reflected signals—a severe drawback in urbanized environments. Later generations of receiver design significantly mitigated these limitations; by 2004 technology existed to build receivers capable of detecting and compensating for static multipath interference conditions where a single echo was 10 dB weaker (within a 30 microsecond time difference) or the same strength (the worst case, but within a 12 microsecond range).

If the transmitters could be kept at sufficiently precise synchronization and sufficiently close geographical spacing to operate within these limits, a single-frequency network using the new receiver design would be possible even with the existing North American ATSC digital broadcast standards.

Tests by Pennsylvania State University public educational WPSX-TV (now WPSU-TV) were initially made in 2003 WPSU was in analog a VHF 3 station which serves State College, Pennsylvania from a distant transmitter which must also cover Johnstown and Altoona. As a digital station, WPSU had used a large UHF 15 transmitter at the location of the original low-VHF broadcast tower, leading to localized problems with terrain shielding which interfered with UHF reception in State College itself. Relocation of the main transmitter would have interfered with the station's ability to serve the other two communities. Addition of a small (50 kW) synchronized digital TV transmitter in State College, on the same frequency as the main UHF 15 signal, proved a means to improve reception; further improvements would be possible by adding small co-channel 50kW transmitters in each community to be served.

ATSC released standards on September 25, 2004, as guidance on the design of multiple transmitters, single frequency networks and multiple frequency networks. The new 2004 standards included:

- A/110A, "Synchronization Standard for Distributed Transmission, Revision A"
- A/111, "Design of Synchronized Multiple Transmitter Networks"

Technical issues addressed included that of synchronization between transmitters (GPS was used to supply a 1Hz and a 10MHz reference frequency, as well as timing information) and precise control of transmitted frequencies (to within 1Hz). Identification for each individual transmitter needed to be embedded in the signal for troubleshooting purposes, yet the main data stream on every synchronized transmitter must be identical; this is done by adding a second, low bit rate spread spectrum signal 27–30dB weaker than the main signal. As this "watermark" identifier is buried under the stronger main signal, multiple repetitions of this same identifier could be received and summed in order to provide a readable version of the watermark to broadcast technicians. A standard receiver, meanwhile, would see the same signal from all transmitters by design.

The generation of non-MPEG data carried as part of the transport layer (such as the position of transmitted frame sync, or the initial state of trellis encoding devices) would also have to be matched exactly between every synchronized transmitter. Even though this data is discarded after the received signal is demodulated, any mismatch could create interference between the various co-channel signals. An extra "operations and maintenance" distributed transmission packet (OMP, packet identifier PID:0x1FFA) would need to be added to the ATSC data at the studio and used to control various parameters needed for configuration and synchronization of the individual transmitters.

The location, directional pattern and power levels for each of the transmitters would also have to be very carefully chosen, as the ATSC system is subject to very strict limits on the maximum time difference between arrival of multiple versions of the same signal at the receiver. In problem reception areas, significant improvements could be obtained, but careful design would be required to operate multiple co-channel transmitters without destructive interference.

Further tests run by Telemundo owned-and-operated station WNJU, Ion TV and broadcast tower owner Richland Towers using one main New Jersey transmitter and a Times Square fill-in DTS secondary transmitter in 2007 indicated that, of fifteen test sites for reception of the station in New York City, 40% would obtain a substantial improvement in signal by the addition of a second transmitter to the existing station, while all but one would receive at least the same signal quality as was observed without a distributed transmission system. New York's Metropolitan Television Alliance was to run similar tests, but on a larger scale, in 2007 and 2008.

== Regulatory issues ==
While the US Federal Communications Commission has supported DTS in principle since 2004, an FCC call for public comment at the end of 2005 garnered a wide spectrum of responses in early 2006, ranging from strong support by groups such as the National Association of Broadcasters to widespread opposition by groups who advocate the free use of "white spaces" (unused broadcast frequencies) for non-broadcast purposes such as wireless data.

The FCC granted six-month special technical authority to WTVE Reading, Pennsylvania in December 2006, allowing it to operate a distributed transmission system on an experimental basis but did not authorize the systems on any permanent, licensed basis at that time.

An FCC-sponsored test market exercise in Wilmington, North Carolina shut down all analog full-power commercial broadcasts at noon on September 8, 2008. While numerous, the resulting calls from viewers were straightforward questions about installation of antennas and converters, or the need to scan for channels before being able to watch digital television, hundreds more were about a more intractable problem. Viewers of longtime full-power low-VHF broadcasters like WECT (NBC 6 Wilmington), a signal which in its analog form reached to the edge of Myrtle Beach, could no longer receive the station - even with the converter and proper antenna installation. The move to UHF 44 and a different transmitter site had substantially reduced WECT's coverage area and, for many who for many years were on the fringes of the analog NBC 6 signal, WECT was no more.

On November 7, 2008, the FCC issued an order approving the use of distributed transmission systems by terrestrial DTV broadcasters, subject to various restrictions. This allows broadcasters to apply for DTS facilities to cover the area once covered by analog TV, while not expanding coverage beyond the existing analog coverage area. It also prohibits a broadcaster "cherry picking" a coverage area in such a way as to cover urban areas while leaving rural viewers with no signal.

This waiver has come too late to allow the newly proposed DTS facilities to be constructed and operational before the federally mandated 2009 analog shutoff.

The Consumer Electronics Association and CTIA proposed in December 2009 to force all stations to use this method, so that the companies they represent could use the remaining space in the TV band for mobile broadband. Unlike the digital television transition in the United States, they do not propose that stations be forced to pay for it however, much like the 2 GHz broadcast auxiliary service was forced to move by the FCC, but only after the beneficiary (Sprint Nextel) compensated broadcasters for the regulatory taking.

== Individual broadcasters ==
In Puerto Rico, Spanish language independent WSTE 7 "Super Siete" operated multiple analog transmitters on the same frequency to cover various portions of the same island; this system showed the limitations due to interference between the transmitters if all are operational simultaneously.

In Pennsylvania, independent WTVE is licensed to serve Reading even though its primary audience is in Philadelphia. A distributed transmission system now allows it to tailor its coverage area to improve coverage in areas where its signal is currently marginal.

In Virginia public television WVPT/WVPY operate a combined total of five additional on-channel synchronized transmitters to fill areas blocked by mountains from two main VHF/UHF transmitters; a set of US$100,000 synchronized digital transmitters can replace service from the same number of conventional analog broadcast translators and also enable overnight datacasting of instructional materials to the area's 188 schools.

In New Mexico, Telemundo affiliate KTDO proposes DTS as a means of pairing a low-power DTV facility currently operating in its community of license (Las Cruces) with a second facility atop a mountain overlooking El Paso, Texas in order to reach a wider audience.

In Missouri, FOX affiliate KRBK operates a DTS as a way to service the Springfield, Missouri market from 5 transmission points based around the Springfield DMA. This system went on air in late 2011.

In Alaska, Anchorage CBS affiliate KAUU operates with limited resources and equipment, covering a large and sparsely populated area with many small broadcast translator stations. While broadcast signal synchronization is not an issue (as the overlap between signals falls entirely into unpopulated areas), the ability to re-use multiple small transmitters may allow the station to avoid the cost of building one large, expensive main transmitter for its digital signal.

== See also ==
- ATSC
- Broadcast translator
- MediaFLO (also a single-frequency network, but using OFDM)
- 8VSB
