= Irène Sapir =

French Holocaust survivor and educator

Irène Sapir (born 1937) is a French Holocaust survivor and educator, and former elected member of the Bergerac municipal council as part of the French Communist Party. In November 2026, a school in Bergerac was named after Sapir despite opposition from the Rassemblement national.

== Biography ==
Irène Sapir was born in 1937 in Belleville, Paris to a Jewish immigrant family. Her father, Aaron Sapir, was Russian and her mother, Léa Asman, was Polish. Aaron joined the French army as a volunteer in 1939 and was taken prisoner in 1940.

On 16 July 1942, when she was five years old, Irène and her mother Léa were arrested during the Vel' d'Hiv roundup, a mass arrest of Jewish people in Paris by the Vichy French and the German occupational authorities. Léa sent Irène to live with a Catholic family in Nanterre to escape persecution. In March 1943, Léa was arrested and deported from Drancy to Auschwitz concentration camp as part of Convoy No. 49. Léa returned to France on 10 May 1945 as one of six survivors from this convoy of a thousand people. Aaron returned from a prisoner of war camp on 8 May in the same year. After the war, the family reunited and settled in Dordogne.

Irène became a teacher and taught at several schools in Dordgone. During this time, Irène worked to support the educational integration of children with disabilities. In 1969, Irène became responsible for the special education section of a school in Bergerac.

=== Political career ===
In 1967, Sapir was elected to the municipal council of Bergerac as a member of the French Communist Party. Sapir was re-elected until 2001, and at one time served as first assistant to the mayor.

=== Holocaust education ===
Beginning in the 1970s, Irène regularly took part in efforts to educate students about the memory of the Holocaust and the dangers of totalitarianism, xenophobia, racism, and anti-semitism.

In 2023, La Médaille du Sénat was awarded to Sapir by Marie-Claude Varaillas in recognition of her work in this area. In 2026, the International League Against Racism and Anti-Semitism awarded Sapir with a Medal of Honour.

== École Irène-Sapir ==
In September 2026, Bergerac's city council adopted a motion to rename a local school, École du Bout des Vergnes, in honour of Sapir to recognise her for her work as an educator and activist.

The city council, consisting of 35 members, voted in support of this motion with the exception of three Rassemblement national members. The Rassemblement national councillors said that their opposition to the motion came from rejecting the idea that a school should be named after a political figure, and because of Sapir's involvement with the French Communist Party. The incident draw coverage and discussion in national media. Fabien Ruet, Mayor of Bergerac, alongside other politicians and Holocaust memorial associations, denounced the Rassemblement national councillors opposition to honouring Sapir. Christian Gérard, the local Rassemblement national leader, said that his opposition to naming a school after Sapir was because "communism has caused millions of deaths" and because Sapir has refused to shake the hands of Rassemblement national's elected officials. In response to the incident, Sapir said "My first fault is being a communist, my second is being Jewish". Coverage of the incident drew attention to longstanding allegations of antisemitism against the Rassemblement national.

On 17 November 2026, a ceremony was held to rename the school in honour of Sapir as the "École Irène-Sapir".
