= David Shapiro =

David or Dave Shapiro may refer to:

- Dave Shapiro (drummer) (1952–2011), performer of Cinematic Sunrise
- David C. Shapiro (1925–1981), American dentist and politician
- David I. Shapiro (1928–2009), American attorney and civil liberties activist
- David L. Shapiro (born 1943), American psychologist
- David Shapiro (bass player) (1952–2011), American jazz musician
- David Shapiro (composer) (born 1969), American composer associated with the choral ensemble The Crossing
- David Shapiro (economist) (born 1946), American economist
- David Shapiro (filmmaker), American filmmaker (2000)
- Dave Shapiro (music agent) (1983–2025), American music agent
- David Shapiro (music producer), for example for the Charlie Rose TV series
- David Shapiro (pianist), performer of the New York Percussion Trio
- David Shapiro (poet) (1947–2024), American poet, literary critic and art historian
- Dr. Cat (born David Shapiro), president, co-founder, executive producer and creative director of Dragon's Eye Productions
- J. David Shapiro (or J.D. Shapiro, born 1969), American filmmaker and stand-up comedian
- Shel Shapiro, born Norman David Shapiro, musician sometimes credited as David Shapiro (e.g. as co-author of the "Let's Live for Today" song)
