= Paul Shapiro =

Paul Shapiro is the name of:

- Paul Shapiro (author) (born 1979), American animal activist
- Paul Shapiro (artist) (born 1939), American Abstract Expressionist and landscape painter
- Paul Shapiro (director) (born 1955), Canadian film and television director
- Paul Shapiro (musician), American Klezmer musician
- Paul A. Shapiro, American Holocaust historian
- Paul R. Shapiro, American astrophysicist
