= Adam Shapiro (television reporter) =

American news anchor

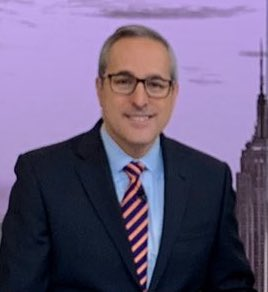
Shapiro in 2019

Adam Shapiro is an American financial news reporter, formerly an anchor at Yahoo Finance. Prior to that, he was an anchor and investigative journalist at FOX Business Network (FBN). He joined FBN in September 2007 as a Washington DC–based reporter and has reported extensively on the US Government, Treasury Department, Federal Reserve and White House. In 1998, Shapiro was hired as a news anchor at WEWS-TV (ABC) in Cleveland. While there, he also anchored Emmy Award-winning morning show Good Morning Cleveland and also hosted Academic Challenge. While there, he received a 2003 regional Emmy Award for Best Anchor and a 2002 Associated Press Award for Best Reporter.

Shapiro left Cleveland in June 2006 to work for New York's WNBC-TV. As a general assignment reporter for the local morning show Today in New York, he covered all aspects of New York City. He also occasionally anchored the early evening and nightly newscasts. In September 2018, it was announced that Shapiro would be going to work for Yahoo Finance as an anchor. Shapiro also worked in Buffalo, New York, as an assistant news director for WGRZ-TV channel 2.
