= Cyrano De Bergerac (sketch) =

"Play" that was part of The Morecambe & Wise Show

Cyrano De Bergerac (1977) was the final "play" made as part of The Morecambe & Wise Show (1968) and featured in their final festive edition originally broadcast on Christmas Day 1977 on BBC1, achieving the highest ever terrestrial viewing figures of over 28,500,000 people. The play starred Eric Morecambe, Ernie Wise, Penelope Keith and Francis Matthews, with cameo appearances from Valerie Leon, Paul Eddington and Richard Briers (the latter two in a reference to their appearance with Keith in the situation comedy The Good Life, which was hugely popular at the time). The plot was loosely based on Edmond Rostand's 1897 story of the titular great swordsman and poet, summed up by Morecambe's memorable line: "...my name is Cyrano, a swordsman and poet, woo the ladies to give them a thrill, but right now I'd like your attention, coz I've got my nose stuck in this grill!" The play, such as it is, concludes with the three main stars singing their version of Joan Edwards' "Darn It, Baby, That's Love" with suitably amended lyrics.

== See also ==
- The Morecambe & Wise Show (1968)
- Morecambe & Wise
