= Spero =

Spero is a name. Notable people with the name include:

- Anna Kalfus Spero (1855–1947), American poet
- Anthony Spero (1929-2008), American criminal
- David Spero (born 1951), American DJ and music manager
- Deborah Spero, American law enforcement official
- Donald Spero (born 1939), American rower and venture capitalist
- Ernest Spero (1894-1960), British politician
- George Spero (footballer) (born 1941), Australian rules footballer
- Greg Spero (born 1985), American pianist and composer
- Joan E. Spero (born 1944), American diplomat
- Nancy Spero (1926–2009), American visual artist
- Shubert Spero (born 1923), American rabbi
- Stanislas Spero Adotevi (1934–2024), Beninese politician
- Wendy Spero, American comedian
- Spero Anargyros (1915–2004) American sculptor

== See also ==
- Shapiro, main article on Ashkenazi Jewish surname which has Spero as a variant
