= David Shapiro (economist) =

American economist (born 1946)

- Born: November 25, 1946 (age 79)

Academic background
- Education: Princeton University

Academic work
- Institutions: Pennsylvania State University

David Shapiro (born November 25, 1946) is an American economist at the Pennsylvania State University. He joined the Penn State faculty in 1980. He is a leading academic in the field of Economic Demography, specializing in fertility transition in sub-Saharan Africa and in the study of children's schooling in Africa. In addition to research and teaching, Shapiro currently heads the economics honors program and previously served as first director and then co-director of undergraduate studies in the department of economics. He received a Fulbright grant in 2004 to teach and conduct research at the University of Kinshasa.

== Education ==
Shapiro grew up north of New York City and attended Irvington High School. Following graduation in 1964, he studied at the University of Michigan, majoring in economics and political science. Shapiro obtained a Ph.D in economics at Princeton University in 1972, specializing in labor economics and demography.

== Academic career ==
During the 1970s, Shapiro was on the faculty at the Ohio State University. His early research work focused on women, youth, and older men in the U.S. labor market. In 1976, he was a recipient of Ohio State's top award for undergraduate teaching. After his move eastward to Penn State in 1980, he became involved in development work in sub-Saharan Africa, and this region subsequently became the major focus of his research. Beginning in the late 1980s, Shapiro traveled to sub-Saharan Africa and worked on a long-term project focused on women's education, employment, and fertility behavior in the city of Kinshasa, capital of the Democratic Republic of the Congo. That work led to a book with co-author Basile O. Tambashe, entitled Kinshasa in Transition: Women's Education, Employment, and Fertility. In spring 2004, Shapiro received a Fulbright grant to spend the 2004–05 academic year at the University of Kinshasa, teaching and pursuing further research there.

In addition to research, Shapiro has been heavily involved with undergraduate education at Penn State. He was director or co-director of undergraduate studies in economics from 1998 to 2011, and he has been the honors adviser and director of the honors program in economics since 1987. He has taught a number of courses, including principles of economics, intermediate microeconomic theory, and field courses in labor and demography. In recent years, his teaching has concentrated on the honors seminar in economics, and coordinating the honors thesis class in the economics department's honors program, as well as on labor economics and economic demography. In 2006, he received Penn State's top award for undergraduate teaching.

== Personal life ==
In his free time, Shapiro enjoys walking his dog, Odie, and climbing. He plays basketball and also is a music lover, with a collection from around the world.

== Selected publications ==
- "Women's Education and Fertility Transition in Sub-Saharan Africa," Vienna Yearbook of Population Research 2012, pp. 9–30.JSTOR 41940995
- "Gender, Education, and the Labour Market in Kinshasa" (with Mark Gough and Roger Pongi), African Populations Studies 25(2), December 2011, pp. 487–508.
- "Fertility Transition in Sub-Saharan Africa: Falling and Stalling" (with Tesfayi Gebreselassie). African Populations Studies 23(1), April 2008, pp. 3–23.
- David Shapiro; B. Oleko Tambashe (2003). Kinshasa in Transition: Women's Education, Employment, and Fertility. University of Chicago Press. ISBN 978-0-226-75057-6.
- "Fertility Transition in Urban and Rural Sub-Saharan Africa: Preliminary Evidence of a Three-Stage Process" (with B. Oleko Tambashe), Journal of African Policy Studies, Fall 2002, 8 (2 & 3), pp. 103–127.
- "Gender, Poverty, Family Structure, and Investments in Children's Education in Kinshasa, Congo" (with B. Oleko Tambashe), Economics of Education Review, 20(4), August 2001, pp. 359–375.
- "Education, Employment and Fertility in Kinshasa and Prospects for Changes in Reproductive Behavior" (with B. Oleko Tambashe), Population Research and Policy Review, 16 (3), June 1997, pp. 259–287.JSTOR 40230144
- "Fertility Decline in Kinshasa," Population Studies, 50 (1), March 1996, pp. 89–103.JSTOR 2175032
- "Racial Differences in Access to High-Paying Jobs and the Wage Gap Between Black and White Women" (with D. Anderson), Industrial and Labor Relations Review, 49 (2), January 1996, pp. 273–286.JSTOR 2524943
- "Aspirations and Expectations of Youth in the United States: Part 1. Education and Fertility" (with Joan E. Crowley), Youth & Society, 13 (4), June 1982, pp. 391–422.
