= Deborah Spero =

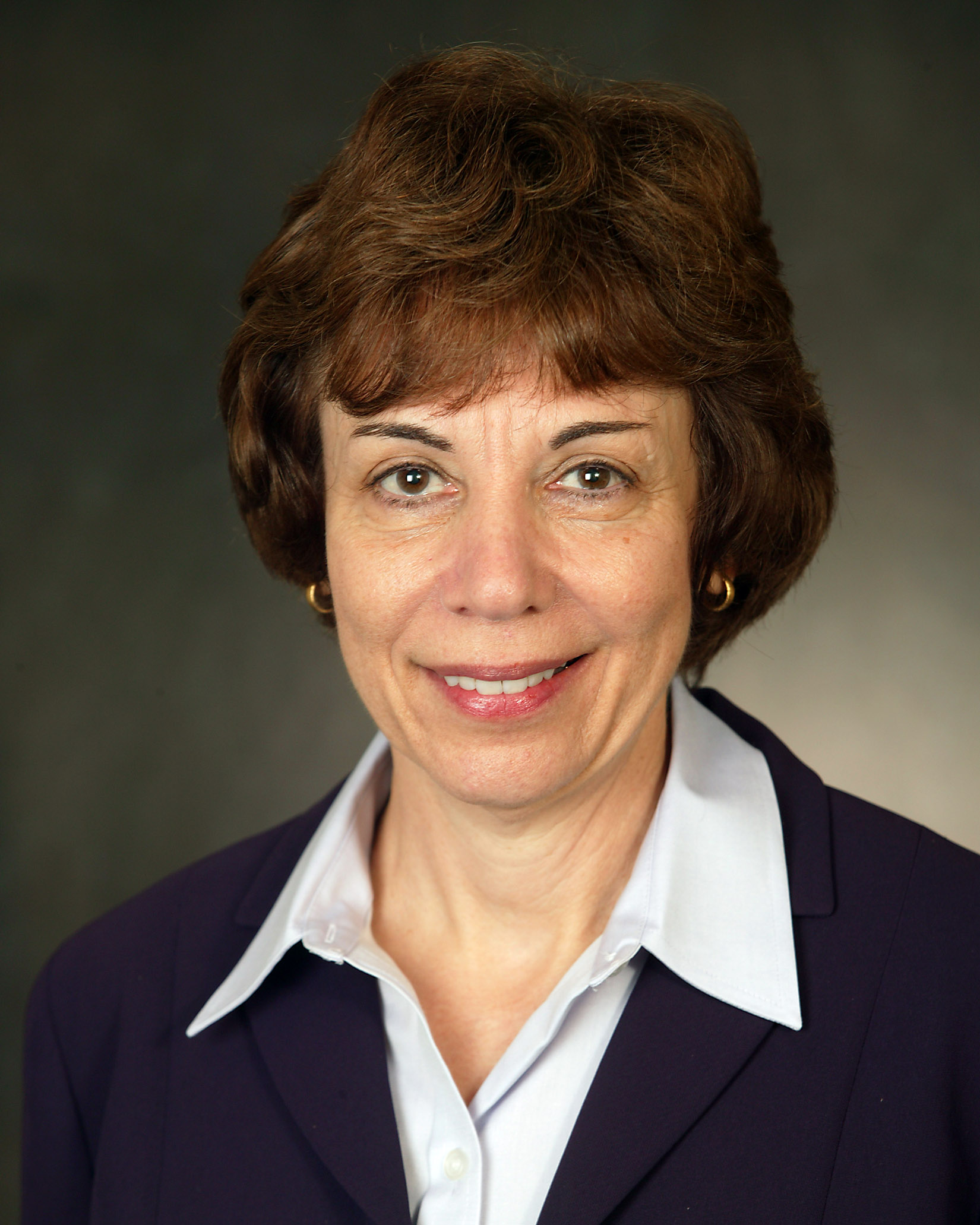
Deborah Spero Official Photo

Deborah Spero was Deputy Commissioner, U.S. Customs and Border Protection (CBP), from April 2004 to August 2007. From November 25, 2005 until June 2, 2006, she served as the Acting Commissioner of CBP. As Acting Commissioner, she advanced strategic initiatives focused on CBP’s priority mission of preventing terrorists and terrorist weapons from entering the United States.

== Biography ==
As Deputy Commissioner, Spero was responsible for providing leadership and executive-level direction to CBP's day-to-day operations. This included oversight of agency initiatives that facilitate the international movement of legitimate, low-risk goods and travelers while promoting effective border security.

Immediately before serving as Deputy Commissioner, Spero directed CBP’s transition team, coordinating the unprecedented merger of work-forces from three legacy agencies (U.S. Customs Service, U.S. Immigration and Naturalization Service, and the Animal and Plant Health Inspection Service) to form the 42,000-employee U.S. Customs and Border Protection. Concurrently, she continued to serve as Assistant Commissioner for Strategic Trade, the position she held from October 2000. The Office of Strategic Trade provides CBP with a national strategic perspective on trade, supports partnerships with the trade community and domestic industry, manages a regulatory audit program, and designs strategies to enable CBP to address trade risk. Prior to assuming leadership of the Office of Strategic Trade, Spero served for five years as Customs’ Assistant Commissioner for Human Resources Management, where she was responsible for a centralized human resources service center of 250 employees that supported 19,000 Customs employees throughout the United States and overseas.

In 2004, Spero received the Meritorious Executive Presidential Rank Award for exceptional long-term accomplishments. In 1999, she received the Distinguished Presidential Rank Award for her accomplishments within the Customs Service and the federal community. In 1996 she was the recipient of the Meritorious Executive Presidential Rank Award for her accomplishments as an executive in the corporate SES.

Spero graduated Phi Beta Kappa from the University of Maryland with a Bachelor of Arts Degree in English Literature.

== Additional sources ==
- Staff (April 2, 2004). "Deborah Spero Announced as U.S. Customs and Border Protection Acting Deputy Commissioner". U.S. Customs and Border Protection. Archived from the original on October 28, 2011.
- Staff (May 18, 2007). "Deputy Commissioner Spero Announces Her Retirement". U.S. Customs and Border Protection.
