= Isaiah Meïr Kahana Shapira =

Polish-German rabbi and author (1828–1887)

- Born: 28 July 1828; Memel, East Prussia, Kingdom of Prussia
- Died: 9 January 1887 (aged 58); Czortkow, Galicia, Austria-Hungary
- Occupations: Rabbi, author
- Writing career
- Language: Hebrew

Isaiah Meïr Kahana Shapira (Hebrew: ישעיהו מאיר כהנא שפירא; 28 July 1828 – 9 January 1887) was a Polish-German rabbi and author.

== Biography ==
Shapira was born in Memel, Prussia, in 1828. He is said to have been familiar at the age of thirteen with all the sedarim of both Talmudim and with a part of the poskim. About 1845 he studied philosophy, mathematics, and astronomy, and as early as 1848 he wrote on ethics for different journals.

Shapira engaged in business as a merchant; but a fire destroyed all his belongings, and he was compelled to accept the rabbinate of Czortkow. Before assuming office, however, he went to Lemberg to train himself in the necessary secular studies. He studied philosophy, ethics, and theology in the academy there for nine months.

He was installed as rabbi in 1860. After two years a quarrel broke out between the two Ḥasidic sects in the town. Shapira interposing to make peace, the brunt of the dissension was turned against him and his inclination to secular education; and he was for a time even deprived of his livelihood. Peace was, however, soon restored. The last ten years of his life Shapira spent in retirement.

== Publications ==
- Sefer zikkaron (in Hebrew). Eydtkuhnen: Avraham Tsevi Katsinelenboigin ṿe-Shemaryahu Rabinoṿits. 1872.
