= Ralph Shapiro =

American politician

Ralph Shapiro (November 27, 1908 – April 8, 1974) was an American businessman and politician from New York.

== Life ==
He was born on November 27, 1908, the son of Jacob Shapiro and Fanny (Rosenthal) Shapiro. He attended Syracuse University College of Law. He established and ran a paper products wholesale company in Oswego, New York.

Shapiro was Mayor of Oswego from 1960 to 1967; and an alternate delegate to the 1964 Democratic National Convention. On February 14, 1974, he was elected to the New York State Assembly, to fill the vacancy caused by the election of Edward F. Crawford to the New York Supreme Court. He took his seat in the 180th New York State Legislature, but died less than two months later, before the end of the regular legislative session.

On March 29, 1974, while driving back to Oswego from Albany, he suffered a heart attack, and stopped at Crouse Irving Memorial Hospital in Syracuse, New York. During the night, after suffering another heart attack, he was transferred to the State University Hospital where he died on April 8. He was buried at the Riverside Cemetery in Oswego.

New York State Assembly
Preceded by Edward F. Crawford	New York State Assembly; 117th District; 1974	Succeeded by John R. Zagame
