= Saul Shapiro =

Saul Taylor Shapiro is the New York City franchisee of Fibrenew doing business as Fibrenew Manhattan Central.

== Early life and education ==
Shapiro was born to Florence and Seymour Shapiro in Hastings-on-Hudson, New York.

A materials science engineering graduate of Brown University, Shapiro has also received an SM in engineering from MIT and an SM in management from the MIT Sloan School of Management as a Leaders for Manufacturing Fellow (now Leaders for Global Operations program). Both of these degrees from MIT were earned in 1991.

He studied furniture design under Tage Frid and Hank Gilpin at the Rhode Island School of Design for two semesters and attended Harvard University's Graduate School of Design for the first year of a three year Master's program. In 2009 he self-published "Two Chairs," a brief memoir of his woodworking journey.

== Career ==
From 2008 to 2012, Shapiro served as President of the Metropolitan Television Alliance, LLC (MTVA). The MTVA was formed by the New York area television broadcast stations shortly after the terrorist attacks of September 11, 2001. Those attacks completely destroyed New York’s analog and digital over-the-air television broadcast infrastructure.

The MTVA’s mission was to coordinate the recovery and the initial rebuilding of that infrastructure at the Empire State Building, and to locate and develop permanent facilities to replace those lost in 2001. This effort included the relocation of stations to temporary facilities in the immediate aftermath of the attacks, the design and construction of analog and digital facilities at the Empire State Building to meet ongoing broadcast needs, and investigation of the design and construction of the possibility of facilities on top of One World Trade Center (the Freedom Tower). In addition, the MTVA investigated methods to further enhance over-the-air digital signals originating from the Empire State Building facility. This work was funded by a grant administered by the Office of Telecommunications and Information Applications (OTIA) within the National Telecommunications and Infrastructure Administration (NTIA), an office of the Department of Commerce.

Previously Shapiro served four years as Vice President of the New York City Economic Development Corporation, covering the Media and Telecommunications sectors. He was responsible for attracting investment and expansion of domestic and international companies to NYC, and to serve as an advocate for companies and industries in their dealings with city government.

Shapiro joined the EDC with experience stretching across both electronic media and telecommunications services and technology, including Sony, the FCC, ABC Television Network and the Internet.

At Sony Corporation of America he served as Vice President of Broadband Services, responsible for new business opportunities based on emerging technologies and standards, with particular focus on the strategic integration of Sony’s US e-business initiatives.

Shapiro was COO at Gist Communications, then the leading independent online provider of TV listings and editorial, from 1999 to 2001. He helped redirect the company’s efforts to developing on-screen interactive applications for a variety of set-top platforms. Shapiro joined Gist from ABC Television where, as Vice President, Broadcast Technology, he was responsible for developing strategic technical initiatives and the network’s transition to digital television broadcast technology.

Shapiro came to ABC after serving as Assistant Bureau Chief for Technology Policy in the Mass Media Bureau of the Federal Communications Commission. While at the FCC, Mr. Shapiro led a team of engineers, economists and lawyers in drafting Rulemakings and Orders for the introduction of digital television to the US broadcast market. He also acted as policy advisor to the Chairman on technological developments and trends in digital media, as well as topics related to the convergence of communications technologies.

Prior to joining the FCC, Shapiro was Director of New Business Development with Sony Corporation of America responsible for identifying new opportunities for Sony’s Television Business Group in the then emerging digital era.

Prior to entering the broadcast television business, he was a microelectronics process development engineer for a variety of firms in the Boston area.
