= Peter Shapiro =

Peter Shapiro may refer to:

- Peter Shapiro (journalist) (1969–2025), American lawyer and music journalist
- Peter Shapiro (financier) (1952–2024), New Jersey financial executive and politician
- Peter Shapiro (concert promoter) (born 1972), American concert promoter and publisher
- Peter Shapiro, American musician, former member of The Marbles and The Loading Zone
