= Metropolitan Television Alliance =

Group in the New York City area

The Metropolitan Television Alliance, LLC (MTVA) is a group organized in the wake of the loss of the transmission facilities atop the World Trade Center in 2001. Its mission is to identify, design and build a facility suitable for the long-term requirements of its member stations to meet their over-the-air digital broadcast requirements. This included designing facilities for the new One World Trade Center (then known as the Freedom Tower) in Lower Manhattan, assessing alternative sites and technologies and dealing with local, state and federal authorities on relevant issues.

The group, which includes Greater New York City area stations WABC-TV, WCBS-TV, WFUT, WNBC, WNET, WNJU, WNYE-TV, WNYW, WPIX, WPXN-TV, WWOR-TV and WXTV, signed a memorandum of understanding in 2003 with the developer Larry A. Silverstein to install antennas atop One World Trade Center.

After the destruction of the broadcast equipment atop the World Trade Center during the September 11 attacks, local television stations moved their main transmission operations to the Empire State Building, which had served as a major broadcast site prior to the completion of the World Trade Center's North Tower. Several stations, especially low powered broadcasters, also utilized facilities at 4 Times Square, although to a more limited extent. In 2006, control of the project was transferred to the Port Authority of New York and New Jersey.

The group received a grant from the NTIA to study distributed transmission system (DTS) in New York City. Multiple tests were run from various sites in the New York and Newark region in 2006 and 2007 by MTVA and individual member stations, with the use of distributed transmission on a permanent, non-experimental basis ultimately approved for US stations by the Federal Communications Commission on November 7, 2008.

Saul Shapiro served as president of the alliance from 2008 through 2012.
