= Bergerac =

Bergerac or de Bergerac may refer to:

== Places ==
- Bergerac, Dordogne, a town in France
  - Bergerac Dordogne Périgord Airport, airport serving the town
  - Gare de Bergerac, the town's railway station
  - Bergerac Périgord FC, the town's football team
- Arrondissement of Bergerac, the administrative region that includes the town

== Other uses ==
- Bergerac (TV series), a British detective series set in Jersey (1981–1991)
- Bergerac (2025 TV series), a reboot of the earlier series
- Bergerac wine, a French wine appellation
- Cyrano de Bergerac (play), 1897 play by Edmond Rostand
- "Bergerac", a 1992 track by Spiderbait from Shashavaglava

== People ==
- Cyrano de Bergerac (1619–1655), French dramatist and duelist
- Jacques Bergerac (1927–2014), French actor
- Michel Bergerac (1932–2016), French businessman

== See also ==
- Cyrano de Bergerac (disambiguation)
