= Mark H. Shapiro =

Emeritus of physics at California State University, Fullerton

Mark H. Shapiro (born 1940 in Boston, Massachusetts) is a professor, emeritus of physics at California State University, Fullerton. Shapiro holds an A.B. degree in physics from the University of California, Berkeley; and, M.S. and Ph.D. degrees in physics from the University of Pennsylvania. He received his Ph.D. from the University of Pennsylvania in 1966.

Shapiro held a postdoctoral fellowship from 1966 to 1968 at the Kellogg Radiation Laboratory at the California Institute of Technology. He held a second post-doctoral fellowship at the Nuclear Structure Research Laboratory at the University of Rochester from 1968 to 1970. In 1970 he joined the physics faculty at California State University, Fullerton, and retired from the university in 2007. During his career he published 103 papers in refereed journals in such fields as experimental nuclear physics, experimental nuclear astrophysics, atmospheric physics, solid earth geophysics, computational condensed matter physics, and physics education. His most notable contributions were in the field of computational condensed matter physics where he used molecular dynamics techniques to explore the properties of ion and cluster collisions with solid and liquid targets. Shapiro together with T.A. Tombrello developed a model for calculating the core excitation of electrons to account for inelastic energy loss in sputtering events. The Shapiro-Tombrello model has been incorporated in the Kalypso molecular dynamics code

Shapiro also is known for the development together with Jonathan Melvin of the California Institute of Technology of one of the first "smart" remote sensing geophysical instruments. The Caltech Radon-Thoron Monitoring devices were remotely located throughout southern California. An on-board microprocessor controlled the operation of the device which periodically sampled water in deep wells for radon concentrations by measuring radioactive aerosols obtained by pumping air through the well water. Radon and environmental data obtained by the devices was periodically transmitted to a central computer at Caltech over telephone lines for analysis.

Shapiro was elected to fellowship in the American Physical Society, and upon retirement became a Senior Fellow of the American Physical Society

In addition, to his teaching and research activities Shapiro served as Chair of the physics department at Fullerton for a total of 10 years. He also served as a rotator in the Science and Engineering Education Directorate of the National Science Foundation. He also held visiting research appointments at the California Institute of Technology and at the National Institute of Standards and Technology.

In 1999 Shapiro began publishing an online journal of commentary on issues in K through 12 and higher education, The Irascible Professor, which includes articles by him and by guest commentators.
