= Danielle Spera =

Austrian journalist and writer

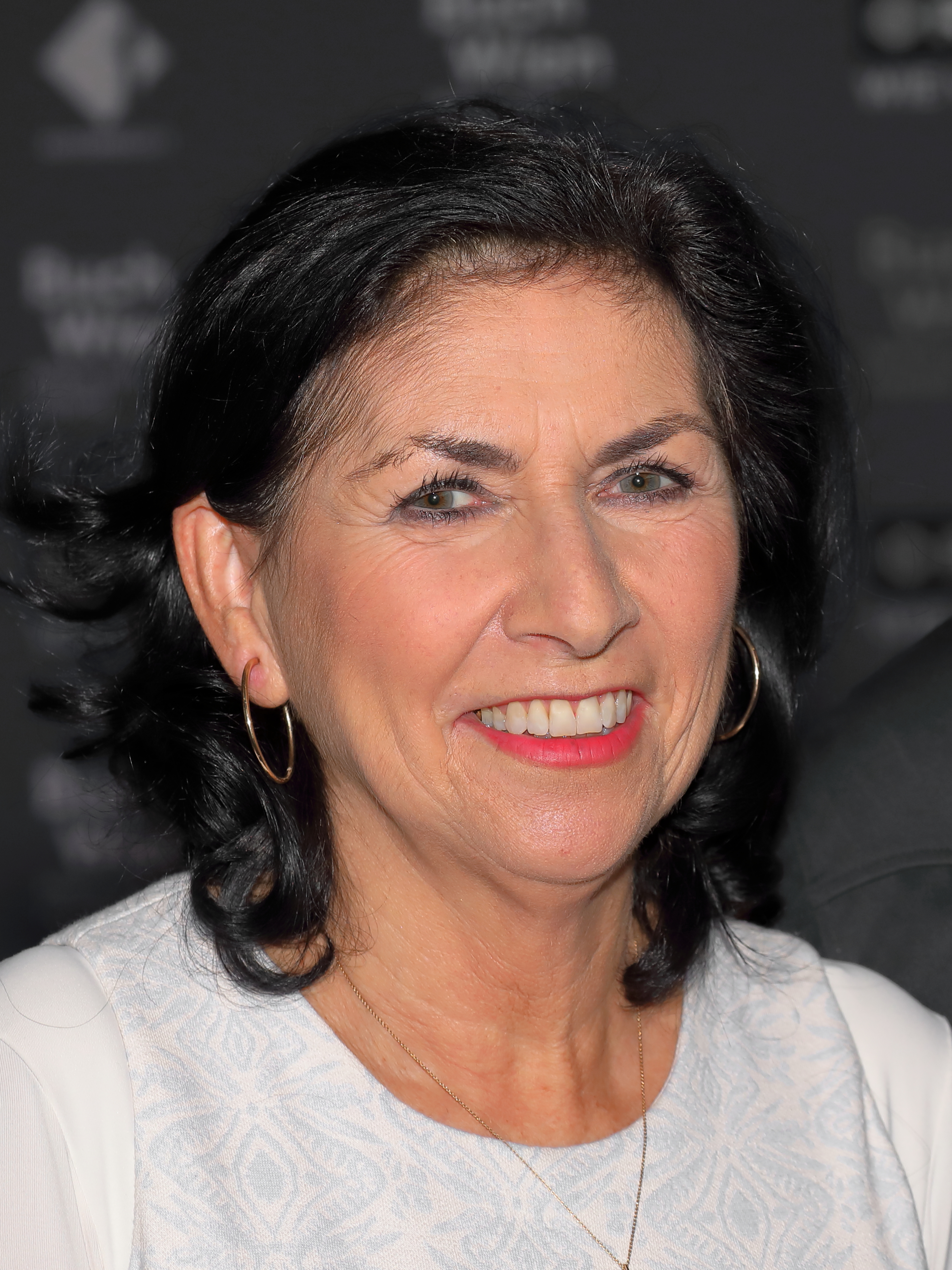
Danielle Spera (Vienna 2023)

Danielle Spera (born 10 August 1957, in Vienna) is an Austrian journalist, writer, and a former director of the Jewish Museum Vienna.

== Education and work ==
=== Academic career ===
Spera studied English and French for two semesters at the University of Vienna, before changing to journalism and political science. In 1983 she completed her doctorate on the election campaigns of the Social Democratic Party in the interwar period, and from 1990 to 2002 she was a lecturer at the Department of Communication at the University of Vienna.

=== Journalistic career ===
Spera started working at the Austrian broadcasting corporation ORF in 1978 while still at university. After two years on the foreign desk of the evening news show, Zeit im Bild 2, she changed to the Wochenschau program, later returning to the foreign desk. After assignments in Central America, Greece and Cyprus, she was appointed ORF correspondent in the US in April 1987, shortly before the announcement that Austrian president Kurt Waldheim was put on the Watch List of persons banned from entering the United States over suspicions about his wartime record. In 1988 Spera returned to the ORF centre in Vienna, and took up the moderation of the main news program of the ORF, the Zeit im Bild 1. She held that position for over 4,000 shows until June 2010, becoming one of the most recognized faces in the Austrian media scene. Her moderation partners included Horst Friedrich Mayer, Josef Broukal, Martin Traxl and Tarek Leitner. She also moderated the weekend magazine 'Brennpunkt.

=== Director of the Jewish Museum ===
Spera applied successfully for the post of director of the Jewish Museum of Vienna in 2009, and formally took over the job in July 2010. In interviews around the time of her appointment, she said she would put her name and celebrity at the service of the museum, which was at the time rather unknown to the general public. She also said she aimed to "open up" the museum to the public, to create a space where fears and prejudices were dispelled and non-Jews could experience both the traumatic past and the vibrant present of the Austrian Jewish community. Specific goals also included reaching out to young people with targeted projects for schools, and to tourists.

"Much has normalised. But there are still many people who have difficulty with it, uttering the word 'Jew', they say 'our Jewish fellow citizens'. I want to open the museum up so people get to know Judaism better," she said in an interview.

To accommodate the new direction of the museum, Spera made the immediate renovation of the Dorotheergasse premises a priority, launching an intensive fundraising effort both from official sources in Austria and from the Jewish diaspora especially in the United States. The renovation, between January and October 2011 aimed at a complete technical overhaul of the museum infrastructure as well as to changes in layout and visitor facilities.

=== Holograms controversy ===
During the renovation project of 2011, a set of glass holograms showing 3D depictions of old Viennese life was broken on its removal from the museum. A museum employee took pictures and sent them to curator blogs and the local media, creating a furore about what critics said was the destruction of cultural artifacts. Spera herself was personally attacked as she was seen as the driving force behind the renovation project. The museum responded with a report from a court-certified expert who testified the holograms could not have been unmounted without damage as they had been glued together almost 15 years prior. The museum added that a second set of the same holograms, that had not been on display, was still intact and would be placed in storage for future use.

=== Impact of tenure ===
Spera was initially a controversial choice for director due to her lack of museum experience, but has since been widely credited with greatly increasing the public profile of the museum through her choice of exhibition themes with wide appeal, pushing for cooperations with other cultural institutions, and personal engagement in publicizing the museum's work through video podcasts and media work. Since its re-opening after the renovation, the museum has attracted record numbers of visitors, both to its regular exhibitions and to its evening program of events featuring visiting artists, which Spera moderates. Specifically, the Judenplatz location posted doubling of its visitor numbers year on year (28.000 visitors in 2011 vs 14.000 in 2010) while attendance to its evening events program tripled. The museum is currently in the Top 30 of Viennese attractions.

=== Other activities ===
In 2000, Spera co-founded the Jewish cultural magazine Nu, to which she is still a frequent contributor. She often appears as a moderator in cultural events, for example leading meetings with prominent artists in the City Theatre Walfischgasse, appearing at the Literatur im Nebel with Salman Rushdie in October 2006, or arranging readings of children's books by Mira Lobe. She has been a member of the Advisory Board of the Nitsch Foundation since 2011, and in 2013 was appointed to the university council of the Medical University of Innsbruck and to the program committee of television station ARTE.

In addition to the general management of the museum, Spera also acts as a curator, most recently for the exhibitions TATIANA LECOMTE (23.05. -27.10.2013), Jewish genius: Warhol's Jews (14.03-28.10.2012) and Waiting room of hope: The Rothschild Hospital in November 1947 - Photos of Henry Ries (19.10.2012-17.02.2013)

== Awards ==
In 1992 and 2007 she received the Austrian television award Romy for the most popular moderator.

== Publications ==
In 1999 Spera published a biography of Hermann Nitsch – Life and Work. The book was released in an updated edition in 2005. Other recent publications include:

- "Jewish Museums between yesterday and today, Viennese Yearbook for Jewish History", Culture and Museum Science Issue 10-2013/14, with Dr. Werner Hanak-Lettner (published in German as Jüdische Museen zwischen gestern und morgen. Reflexionen aus involvierter Außenperspektive. Wiener Jahrbuch für jüdische Geschichte, Kultur und Museumswesen, Band 10-2013/14).
- Our City! Jewish Vienna til today, catalogue for the exhibition of the same name, Vienna 2013, with Dr. Werner Hanak-Lettner (published in German as Unsere Stadt! Jüdisches Wien bis heute. Katalog zur gleichnamigen Ausstellung. Wien 2013)
- A Good Day. Installation Andrew M. Mezvinsky, catalogue for the exhibition of the same name, Vienna 2013
- TATIANA LECOMTE צלם וצילום, catalogue for the exhibition of the same name, Vienna 2013
- meeting : jedermann - rabinovich revisited, catalogue for the exhibition of the same name, Vienna 2013
- Jewish Geniuses - Warhol's Jews, catalogue for the exhibition of the same name, Vienna 2012

== Personal life ==
Spera was born to a Jewish father and a Catholic mother and visited a Catholic private school. She converted to Judaism in her mid-20s and is married to psychoanalyst Martin Engelberg. The couple have three children: Samuel, Rachel and Deborah. She describes herself as leading a traditional Jewish life at home, observing Schabbat and all religious holidays.
