= Sapir (surname) =

Sapir is a surname (see Shapiro for etymology). Notable people with the surname include:

- André Sapir, Belgian economist
- Edward Sapir, American anthropologist and linguist
  - J. David Sapir, his son, also an anthropologist and linguist
- Esteban Sapir, Argentine cinematographer and director
- Estelle Sapir, Polish Holocaust survivor
- Gal Sapir, Israeli footballer
- Irène Sapir, French Holocaust survivor
- Jacques Sapir, French economist
- Mark Sapir, Russian-American mathematician
- Michael Sapir, American businessman, founder of ProFunds Group and ProShares
- Pinchas Sapir, Israeli politician
- Richard Sapir, American novelist
- Tamir Sapir, American businessman
- Yosef Sapir, Israeli politician

== See also ==
- Sapir (disambiguation)
- Shapiro, main article regarding the name and its variants
