= Seymour Shapiro =

Seymour Lester Shapiro (1916 - 1961) was an organic chemist best known for his pioneering work on a class of drugs used to treat symptoms of adult-onset diabetes. Phenformin was marketed under the name "DBI" until it was taken off the market after being linked to increased incidence of lactic acidosis, a potentially fatal condition.

Shapiro was born in New York City, New York, on October 1, 1916. After graduation at age 14 from the storied Abraham Lincoln High School (Brooklyn, New York) in 1931, he entered Brooklyn College where he majored in Chemistry and received the degree of Bachelor of Science in June 1935 at the age of 19. In 1934 while a junior in Brooklyn College, he tied for first place in a citywide contest in handling difficult problems of calculus. He completed the degree of Master of Science in June 1937 at Brooklyn Polytechnic Institute (now part of New York University), New York. His thesis, "Equimolecular Condensation of Aldehydes with Phenols" was published in the Journal of the American Chemical Society (JACS) in 1937.

During the period 1936 - 41, Shapiro was employed in the Railway Mail Service and as a quantitative organic microanalyst at Van Ameringen-Haebler in Elizabeth, NJ (later part of International Flavors & Fragrances). In July, 1941 he entered the United States Army.

His initial tour within the United States included an assignment covered by Time magazine. During this period he was assigned the task of making injectable poison ivy extract for use in treatment of poison ivy infections. While it proved quite successful on the troops, Shapiro himself developed an extreme sensitivity to the extract and the ivy plant itself.

He was then assigned as Toxicologist in the 15th Medical General Laboratory and then as Chemist of the Board for the Study of the Severely Wounded, Mediterranean Theater of Operations. The findings of this group were published in the book entitled, "The Physiologic Effects of Wounds." As an additional outgrowth of this work, Shapiro published "A Suggested Simplification of Blood Volume Analysis Using the Dye T 1824,"

For his work on this Board, Shapiro was awarded the Bronze Star Medal. He was discharged from the army in 1946 with the rank of Major.

Following his military service, Shapiro became Director of the Biological Laboratory, Arlington Chemical Co., Yonkers, New York, and, in January 1952, was assigned as Assistant Director, Organic Research, US Vitamin Corp., Yonkers, New York. His work there drew attention from "The Talk of the Town" section of The New Yorker.

The work for Shapiro's doctoral thesis, "Reaction of Phenyl Biguanide with Esters and Related Compounds", published in JACS in 1954, was performed at the Polytechnic Institute of Brooklyn and in the laboratories of the Arlington Chemical Co. and US Vitamin Corp. under the direction of Prof. Charles G. Overberger. His work there led to the development of DBI.

"Developments in triazine chemistry continued in our laboratories under the direction of Shapiro...We selected betaphenyl ethyl triazine as the product to be studied for its diuretic properties. Pharmacological and toxicological studies having been completed, we were about to start clinical trials - when Lederle's Diamox broke into the market. It was obvious to us that Diamox was superior to our triazine compound and we wisely shelved the product. This left us with a fairly large stock of betaphenetheylbiguanide. We had for some time considered investigating the hypoglycemic properties of our biguanide compounds... Of the more than 260 biguanide compounds derivatized on the 1 and 1,5 nitrogens, it is unusual that of the 6 to 8 compounds found to be safe and pharmacologically active as oral hypoglycemic agents we found the very first, the betaphenethyl derivative, proved to be the most effective. The compound, with the generic name Phenformin was, after exhaustive clinical evaluation, finally chosen. After approval by the FDA, it was introduced in 1958 to the medical profession under the trade name DBI, about one year after the introduction of tolbutamide, the first sulfonylurea oral antidiabetic drug marketed in the US. DBI, after a modest start, has in ten years since its introduction become the second best selling oral antidiabetic drug in the United States and abroad."

Shapiro was the author or co-author of 70 articles in scientific journals specializing in organic and pharmaceutical chemistry. The subject range included blood chemistry, anesthetics, androgens, biguanides, diuretics, indanols, indandiones, triazines and others. A total of 76 patents bear his name as inventor or co-inventor, all on subjects related to organic and pharmaceutical chemistry.

In an ironic turn, after a successful career in the field of hypoglycemic and blood chemistry, he fell victim to diabetes (Type 1, against which DBI was not effective) and leukemia. After a protracted illness he died on December 9, 1961, at 45 years of age. In 1962, the Seymour L. Shapiro Award in Organic Chemistry was established at the Polytechnic Institute of Brooklyn. The award is given as merited to an outstanding graduate in Organic Chemistry. Shapiro was posthumously awarded the Freedman Patent Award from the American Institute of Chemists in 1968.

Shapiro married Florence Susan Mintz in 1951, and had two sons, Mitchell and Saul Shapiro.
