= List of film adaptations of Cyrano de Bergerac =

There are numerous film adaptations of Edmond Rostand's play Cyrano de Bergerac:

- Cyrano de Bergerac (1900 film), a French production starring Benoît-Constant Coquelin
- Cyrano de Bergerac (1925 film), starring Pierre Magnier
- Cyrano de Bergerac (1938 film), a live television adaptation starring James Mason and Leslie Banks
- Cyrano de Bergerac (1946 film), a French production starring Claude Dauphin
- Cyrano de Bergerac (1950 film), starring José Ferrer
- Cyrano de Bergerac (1962 film) starring Christopher Plummer
- Cyrano de Bergerac (1968 film), BBC Play of the Month, starring Eric Porter
- Cyrano de Bergerac (1974 film), starring Peter Donat
- Cyrano de Bergerac (1985 film), starring Derek Jacobi
- Cyrano de Bergerac (1990 film), a French production starring Gérard Depardieu
- Cyrano de Bergerac (2008 film), starring Kevin Kline
- Cyrano (2021 film), an American-British musical drama directed by Joe Wright

== Derivative versions ==
- Love Letters (1945 film), screenplay by Ayn Rand
- Secret Admirer (1985), written and directed by David Greenwalt and starring Lori Loughlin and Fred Ward
- Aru kengo no shogai (Life of an Expert Swordsman) (1959), starring Toshirō Mifune, adapted by director Hiroshi Inagaki
- Roxanne (film) (1987), directed by Fred Schepisi, starring Steve Martin
- Saajan (1991), a disabled poet helps the brother from his adopting family fall in love with the woman he also loves, by writing letters on his behalf, starring Sanjay Dutt, Salman Khan and Madhuri Dixit.
- Duet (1994 film), Indian film in which two brothers love the same woman. The older brother is a talented saxophone player albeit overweight which results in his reluctance to express his love openly, based on the Gérard Depardieu film
- The Truth About Cats & Dogs (1996), starring Uma Thurman
- Whatever It Takes (2000 film), starring James Franco
- Mujhse Dosti Karoge! (2002), a woman secretly in love with her childhood friend writes letters on another’s behalf, makes him fall for her, but after learning the other woman loves him too, sacrifices her own love to help her win him over, starring Hrithik Roshan, Rani Mukherji and Kareena Kapoor Khan.
- I Want To Marry Ryan Banks (2004), starring Bradley Cooper
- Bigger Than the Sky (2005), in which the protagonist auditions for a local community theater production of Cyrano de Bergerac, and the movie plays out with it as the background theme
- Cyrano Agency (2010), a South Korean romance-comedy of a group of actors and stage experts working as professional lovemakers by writing monologues, staging scenarios and directing their clients
  - Idhu Enna Maayam (2015), an Indian Tamil-language romantic comedy film by A. L. Vijay, a remake of the South Korean film.
- Megamind (2010), animated film by DreamWorks, inspired by the story and re-imagining the characters in a superhero and super villain format, with the titular Megamind as Cyrano
- Let It Shine (2012), a Disney Channel Original Movie loosely based on the story.
- Oohalu Gusagusalade (2014), an Indian Telugu-language adaptation, written and directed by Srinivas Avasarala
- Sierra Burgess Is a Loser (2018), a gender reversed Netflix Original based loosely on the story
- #Roxy (2018)
- The Most Beautiful Girl in the World (2018), a German movie re-imagining the characters as students in modern times.
- The Half of It (2020), another Netflix Original that has Cyrano as a girl, Roxanne as a girl, and Christian as a boy
- It Takes Three (film)
- CyranØ - A RomCom for the AI generation (2025 short), two people find love in spite of an AI telling them to lie to optimize their dating profiles.

== See also ==
- Start-Up (South Korean TV series) (2020), loosely based on the story
- Cyrano de Bergerac, the real-life person on whom the play is loosely based
