= Michael Spira =

British physician (born 1944)

Dr Michael Spira (born 24 April 1944) is a British medical doctor and GP with a special interest in weight management.

== Career ==
Spira was educated at Stowe School, Buckingham. After training at St Bartholomew's Hospital, London, he entered general practice and became a senior partner in a large NHS general practice. He was also a visiting physician at Bupa Wellness, London. He was a member of the Counterweight Project, the government-funded multi-centre obesity programme to evaluate the management of obesity in primary care, and of the Scottish Intercollegiate Guidelines Network Working Party on Obesity. He is a member of the National Obesity Forum. He has been adviser to several leading slimming organisations and publications and has appeared on many national radio and TV programmes, such Kilroy and ITV's Good Morning. He has had various white papers published on a variety of topics, including weight management. He has a particular interest in the role of HIIT (high intensity interval training) in weight control. Currently he is medical director of the Smart Clinics which provide integrated healthcare in South Kensington, Notting Hill and Wandsworth

== Publications ==
- Basic Health Education (with Vincent Irwin) (Longman 1977)
- How To Lose Weight Without Really Dieting (Penguin 1978, revised edition 1988)
- The No Diet Book (Fontana 1982)
- The 3D Diet (Corgi 1984)
- Understanding Menopause (Hawker Publications 1987)
- Understanding Nutrition (Hawker Publications 1996)
- Angina, Hawker Publications 1996
- How To Lose Weight Now And Forever (2004)
- The Chelsea Diet (2006)
- The 12 Minute Weight Loss Plan (Piatkus 2015)
- The Little Book of Health: Simple Steps to a Longer, Healthier, Happier Life (Vie, January 2018)

== Contributor to ==
- Everyman's Encyclopaedia, Dent
- BMA Complete Family Health Encyclopaedia, Dorling-Kindersley 1990
- The Mind, Reader's Digest 2003
