= Schapiro =

Schapiro is a surname (see Shapiro), and may refer to:

- Alexander Schapiro: see Sascha Schapiro
- Andrew H. Schapiro (b. 1963), US Ambassador
- Boris Schapiro (1909–2002), British bridge player
- J. Salwyn Schapiro (1879–1973), American historian
- Leonard Schapiro (1908–1983), British historian
- Lillian Milgram Schapiro (1902–2006), American pediatrician
- Mary Schapiro (b. 1955), American SEC chair (2009-2012)
- Meyer Schapiro (1904–1996), American art historian
- Miriam Schapiro (1923–2015), Canadian-born American artist
- Morris Schapiro (1903–1996), American chess master
- Morton O. Schapiro (b. 1953), American economist and university president
- Sascha Schapiro (1882/83–1946), Russian anarchist who fought in Ukraine and Spain
- Steve Schapiro (1934–2022), American photojournalist

== See also ==
- Shapiro, surname (main article); variants:
  - Schapira, list
  - Shapira, list
  - Shapero, list
- Tristram Shapeero, English TV director
- Speyer, city in Germany; name Shapira etc. based on it
