= Chapiro =

Chapiro is a surname (see Shapiro). Notable people with the surname include:

- Jacques Chapiro (1887–1972), Jewish Russian-born, French painter.
- Liliane Chapiro-Volpert (1902–1982), known as Lilian Constantini, French actress in the 1920s and 1930s.
- Mikhail Chapiro (born 1938), Jewish Russian-born, Canadian painter.

== See also ==
- Shapiro, main article
