= Mikhail Chapiro =

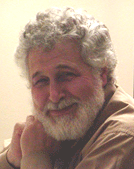
- Born: Mikhail Chapiro; 6 July 1938 (age 87); Novozybkov, USSR (now Russia)
- Other names: Mikhail Shapiro
- Education: Saint Petersburg Art and Industry Academy
- Occupation(s): Artist, painter
- Spouse: Irina Nakhimovich
- Children: Elena

Mikhail Chapiro (also Shapiro; Russian: Михаил Шапиро; born 1938) is an artist of Russian Jewish origin currently living and working in Montreal, Quebec, Canada.

== Biography ==
Chapiro was born in the city of Novozybkov, near Belarus, in 1938. Soon thereafter his family moved to the nearby city of Gomel, Belarus, where Chapiro spent most of his childhood. During the German occupation of the western part of USSR (1941-1943) Chapiro's family was evacuated to the eastern part of Russia.

Since his early childhood, Chapiro was captivated by painting. Thanks to his teachers, Peter Chernyshevsky and Boris Zvenigorodsky, the artists of great experience and talent, this endowment became his predilection, the raison d'être of his life. After 6 years of studies, he graduated from the Mukhina Institute of Arts and Industrial Design in Leningrad (now Saint Petersburg Art and Industry Academy).

After graduation, he was sent for obligatory work (as was practiced in the USSR) to the capital of Siberia, the city of Novosibirsk, where he spent 7 years working for the government as a stylist, and in his free time, at nights, working on his paintings.

In 1974 Chapiro left Novosibirsk and moved to Moscow, where he joined the Russia's underground avant-garde movement and regularly exhibited his works at the avant-garde center at Malaya Gruzinskaya 28, which in 1981 became the home of his solo exhibition. Like all underground artists, he was prosecuted by the Soviet regime. However, he was recognized by Russian intellectual elite, by scientists, especially physicists, by sportsmen, poets, musicians and artists. Only with Perestroyka he was recognized by a wider public. From 1988 to 1990 his paintings were exhibited at the Moscow Modern Art Gallery MARS.

Chapiro immigrated to Canada from Russia in 1992. The themes of his paintings are portraits, landscapes, cityscapes, animals, flowers, and abstract works. The manner of Chapiro's paintings is a mixture of realism and abstraction. Chapiro paints mainly in oil on canvas. He is an author of portraits of Soviet physicists, such as Andrey Sakharov, Lev Landau, Evgeny Lifshitz, Mikhail Leontovich, Igor Tamm, Lev Artsimovich, Abram Ioffe. He is an author of a portrait of Russian ballerina Maya Plisetskaya. The painting is currently owned by St. Petersburg Museum for Theatre Arts. The portrait of Soviet composer Dmitry Shostakovich by Chapiro was exhibited at various exhibitions in New York and New Jersey. Chapiro's works represented at the Museum of Russian Art in New York. His personal exhibitions are regularly held in Montreal. His recent exhibition at Galerie Michel-Ange, Montreal, Canada, has included 15 portraits of most famous artists of 19th and 20th centuries, such as Claude Monet, Salvador Dalí, Pablo Picasso, Kazimir Malevich and others.
