= Shapero =

Shapero is a surname (see Shapiro). Notable people with the surname include:

- Harold Shapero (1920–2013), American composer
- Rich Shapero (born 1948), American venture capitalist and author

== See also ==
- Shapiro (surname), main article; variants:
  - Schapira, list
  - Schapiro, list
  - Shapira, list
  - Tristram Shapeero, English TV director
- Speyer, city in Germany
