= André Spire =

French poet, writer, and Zionist activist (1868–1966)

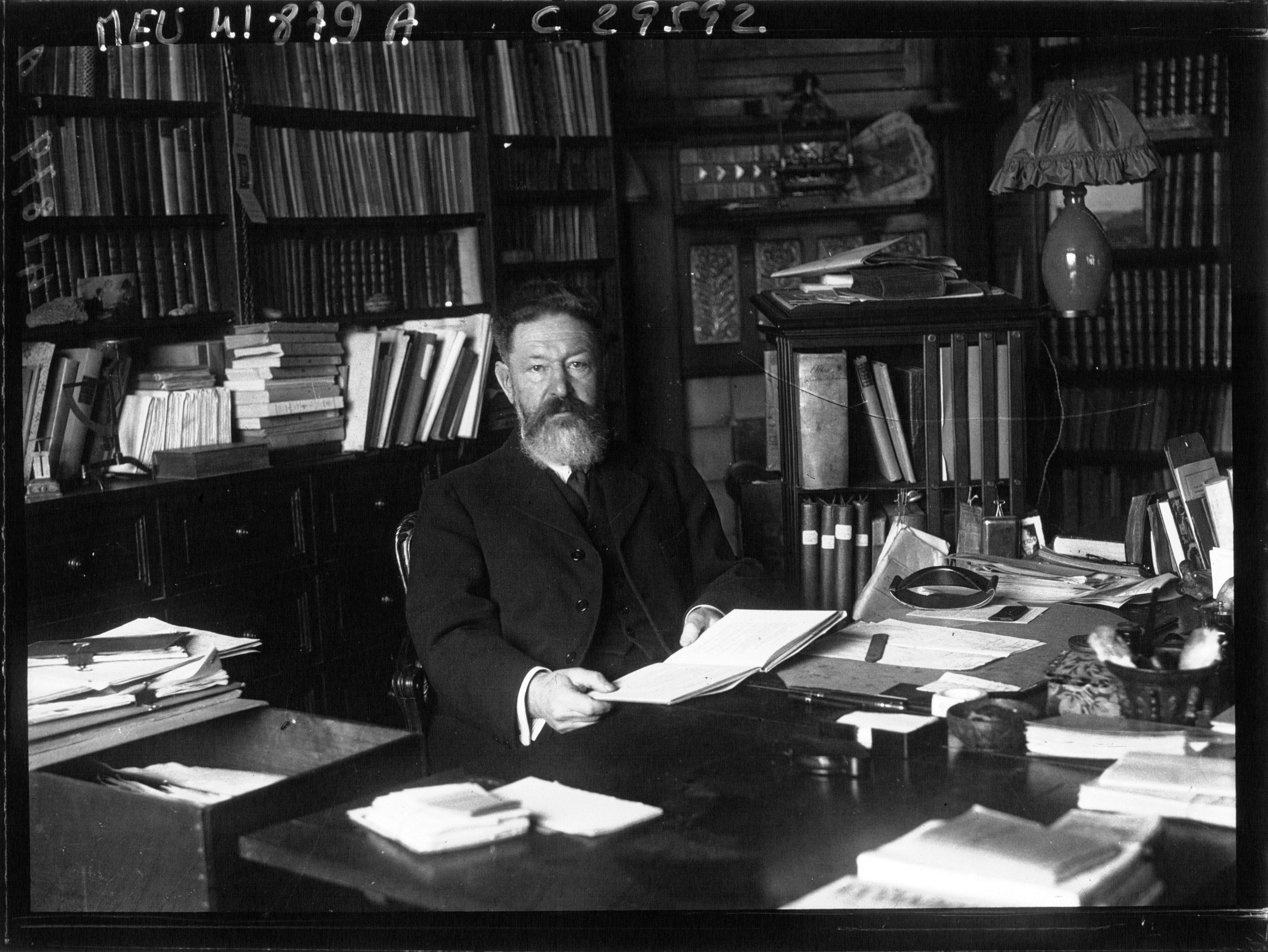
André Spire in 1927.

André Spire (28 July 1868 – 29 July 1966) was a French poet, writer, and Zionist activist.

== Biography ==
Born in 1868 in Nancy, to a Jewish family of the middle bourgeoisie, long established in Lorraine, Spire studied literature, then law. He attended the École libre des sciences politiques, now called the Paris Institute of Political Studies (Institut d'études politiques), or Sciences-Po, and later, in 1894, was appointed to the Conseil d'État on successfully passing the competitive entrance examination. A few months later, the Dreyfus Affair broke when a Jewish military officer was wrongly accused of treason, revealing how widespread antisemitism was at the time in France. Spire provoked a duel with a columnist from the Libre Parole (a nationalist and antisemitic newspaper run by Edouard Drumont) for alleging that the Jews appointed to the Conseil d'État won their positions not on merit but through illicit influence. Spire was wounded in the arm.

In 1896, he and a Catholic colleague founded the Société des Visiteurs, dedicated to helping workers suffering from unemployment, illness, or injury. Shortly thereafter, he took part in the Coopération des Idées, where he met Daniel Halévy. The two men founded an Université populaire. Spire left the Conseil d'Etat for the ministry of Labour, then joined the staff of Jean Dupuy, Minister of Agriculture in the government of Waldeck-Rousseau. He became friends with Charles Péguy who published his Et vous riez ! in Les Cahiers de la Quinzaine (1905), poems which reflect a certain disappointment with the workers' movement.

In 1902, he was commissioned by the Office du Travail (Labour Office) to conduct an inquiry into the labour conditions of English workers and discovered the East European Jewish immigrant neighbourhood of Whitechapel in the East End of London. In 1904, he was deeply moved by a short story by Israel Zangwill in the Cahiers de la Quinzaine entitled Chad Gadya. It relates the tale of a young Venetian Jew from a traditional family attracted by the external non-Jewish world. Not able to find his place in either world he ends by committing suicide.

Spire engaged in the Zionist cause, joining Zangwill's Jewish Territorial Organisation (ITO) and campaigned, publishing numerous articles. In 1912 he founded the AJJ (Association des Jeunes Juifs), the French Jewish youth organisation.

During the First World War, Spire, too old to be called up, ran the family factory. He was also charged by the Ministry of Agriculture with work on the reconstruction of war-damaged regions. In 1920, Dr. Chaim Weizmann invited Spire to accompany him to Palestine.

Following the defeat of France in 1940, Spire was forced into exile in the United States of America where he was invited to teach French literature at the New School for Social Research and the École libre des Hautes études in New York. Very active, Spire also participated in numerous conferences and completed his classic study of poetics Plaisir poétique et plaisir musculaire, essai sur l'évolution des techniques poétiques (José Corti 1949; new edition 1986).

After the war he returned to France. Spire died in Paris at the age of 98. His funeral was led by Rabbi David Feuerwerker.

== List of works ==
=== Poetry ===
- La Cité présente, Ollendorff, 1903
- Et vous riez !, Cahiers de la Quinzaine, 1905
- Versets (Et vous riez - Poèmes juifs), Mercure de France, 1908
- J'ai trois robes distinguées, Moulins, Cahiers du Centre, 1910
- Vers les routes absurdes, Mercure de France, 1911
- Et j'ai voulu la paix !, Londres, The Egoist, 1916
- Poèmes juifs, Genève, Kundig, 1919
- Samaël, poème dramatique, Crès, 1921
- Poèmes de Loire, Grasset, 1929
- Instants, Bruxelles, Cahiers du Journal des Poètes, 1936
- Poèmes d'ici et de là-bas, New York, The Dryden Press, 1944
- Poèmes d'hier et d'aujourd'hui, José Corti, 1953
- Poèmes juifs, Albin Michel, 1959; rééd. 1978; rééd. 2020

=== Prose ===
- Israel Zangwill, Cahiers de la Quinzaine, 1909
- Quelques Juifs, Mercure de France, 1913
- Les Juifs et la guerre, Payot, 1917
- Le Sionisme, 1918
- Le Secret, Nouvelle Revue Française, 1919
- Fournisseurs, Éditions du Monde Nouveau, 1923
- Henri Franck, lettres à quelques amis, Grasset, 1926
- Refuges, avec neuf bois gravés de Maurice Savin, Éditions de la Belle Page, 1926
- Quelques Juifs et demi-Juifs,2 t., Grasset, 1928
- Plaisir poétique et plaisir musculaire, Vanni-José Corti, 1949; rééd. José Corti 1986
- Souvenirs à bâtons rompus, Albin Michel, 1962

=== Correspondance ===
- « Lettres de Péguy par André Spire », L'amitié Charles Péguy, No 40, août 1954.
- « Péguy et André Spire, Correspondance », L'amitié Charles Péguy, No 132, juillet 1967.
- « Henri Hertz et André Spire, leur amitié à travers quelques lettres inédites », par Thérèse Marix-Spire, Europe No 489, janvier 1970.
- Valery Larbaud - André Spire, Correspondance, édition établie et présentée par Bernard Delvaille, Éditions des Cendres, 1992.
- Ludmila Savitzky & André Spire, Une amitié tenace, Correspondance 1910-1957, édition présentée, établie et annotée par Marie-Brunette Spire, Les Belles Lettres, 2010.
- André Spire & Jean-Richard Bloch, Correspondance 1912-1947, « Sommes-nous d'accord ? », édition établie, préfacée et annotée par Marie-Brunette Spire, coll. « Pour Mémoire », Éditions Claire Paulhan, 2011.
- « À vous de coeur... » André Spire et Otokar Fischer 1922-1938, Textes édités, annotés et présentés par Marie-Odile Thirouin, Musée de la littérature tchèque (PNP), Éditions Depozitár, 2016.
- Daniel et Marianne Halévy - André Spire, Correspondance 1899-1961, Des ponts et des abîmes : une amitié à l'épreuve de l'histoire, édition établie, présentée et annotée par Marie-Brunette Spire-Uran, Honoré Champion, 2020.

=== Bibliography ===
- Stanley Burnshaw, André Spire and his Poetry, USA, The Centaur Press, 1933.
- Paul Jamati, André Spire, Seghers, coll. Poètes d'aujourd'hui, 1962.
- Le centenaire d'André Spire, Europe, n° 467, mars 1968.
- Revue Peut-être, No 3, 2012.
