= Szapiro =

Szapiro is a Polish Jewish surname, a variant of Shapiro. Notable people with this surname include:

- Anna Szapiro, mother of Georges Charpak
- Deborah Szapiro, film producer
- Jakub Szapiro, The King of Warsaw (TV series) main character
- Gedali Szapiro (Grzegorz Szapiro, Gedalia Shapira, 1929–1972), Polish–Israeli chess master
- Hanna Sawicka (Hanna Krystyna Szapiro 1917–1943), Polish communist
- Henoch Szapiro (Henryk Szaro, 1900–1942), Polish screenwriter and film director
- Klonimus Kalmish Szapiro (1889–1943), Grand Rabbi of Piaseczno, Poland
- Marek Szapiro (1884–1942), artist
- Salomea Szapiro, mother of Stefan Kisielewski
- Salomon Szapiro (1882–1944), Polish chess master
- Shayne-Feygl Szapiro (Dina Blond, 1887–1985), member of the Jewish Labour Bund in Poland and a prolific Yiddish translator
- Willy Schapiro (also Szapiro or Schapira, 1910–1944), Polish Jew soldier

== See also ==
- Szpiro
