= Szpiro =

Szpiro is a Polish Jewish surname, a variant of Shapiro. Notable people with this surname include:

- Abram Szpiro (1912-1943), Polish chess master
- Dawid Szpiro (1922-1944), Hashomer Hatzair resistance member killed by the Gestapo (see Holocaust Encyclopedia entry)
- George Szpiro (born 1950), Israeli-Swiss author, journalist, and mathematician
- Lucien Szpiro (1941–2020), French mathematician
  - Szpiro's conjecture, formulated by Lucien Szpiro

== See also ==
- Shapiro, main article on Ashkenazi Jewish surname with Szpiro as one of many variants
- Szapiro
