= Schaefer =

Schaefer is an alternative spelling and cognate for the German word schäfer, meaning 'shepherd', which itself descends from the Old High German scāphare. Variants "Shaefer", "Schäfer" (a standardized spelling in many German-speaking countries after 1880), the additional alternative spelling "Schäffer", and the anglicised forms "Schaeffer", "Schaffer", "Shaffer", "Shafer", and "Schafer" are all common surnames.

== Schaefer ==
Born in 1800–1899

- Arnold Schaefer (1819–1883), German historian
- Germany Schaefer (1877–1919), American baseball player
- Jacob Schaefer Sr (1850–1910), American billiards player
- Jacob Schaefer Jr (1894–1975) American billiards player
- Jacob Schaefer (composer) (1888–1936), American composer and conductor
- Marie Charlotte Schaefer (1874–1927), American physician
- Rudolph Jay Schaefer I (1863–1923), American businessman

Born in 1900–1949

- Bill Schaefer (field hockey) (1925–2003), New Zealand field hockey player
- Bob Schaefer (born 1944), American baseball coach
- Daniel Schaefer (1936–2006), American politician
- Fred K. Schaefer (1904–1953), German and American geographer
- George Schaefer (1920–1997), American stage and film director
- Gerard John Schaefer (1946–1995), American killer, rapist, and suspected serial killer
- Henry F. Schaefer, III (born 1944), American chemist, academic and Protestant educator
- Jack Warner Schaefer (1907–1991), American fiction author
- James Schaefer (1938–2018), American politician and rancher
- Kermit Schaefer (1923–1979), American writer, broadcast and Pardon My Blooper record series producer
- Milner Baily Schaefer (1912–1970), American fisheries biologist
- Ronald P. Schaefer (born 1945), American linguist
- Udo Schaefer (1926–2019), German Bahá'í author
- Vincent Schaefer (1906–1993), American chemist and meteorologist who developed cloud seeding
- Walter V. Schaefer (1904–1986), American jurist and educator
- Will Schaefer (1928–2007), American composer
- William Donald Schaefer (1921–2011), American politician

Born after 1950

- Bradley E. Schaefer, American physicist
- Brian Schaefer (born 2002), American soccer player
- Jarrett Schaefer (born 1979), America film director and screenwriter
- Jeff Schaefer (born 1960), American baseball player
- Kurt Schaefer (born 1965), American academic
- Laura Schaefer (disambiguation), multiple people
- Matthew Schaefer (born 2007), Canadian ice hockey player
- Nolan Schaefer (born 1980), Canadian ice hockey player
- Peter Schaefer (author) (born 1943), American academic and religious history author
- Peter Schaefer (ice hockey) (born 1977), Canadian ice hockey player
- Reid Schaefer (born 2003), Canadian ice hockey player
- Richard Schaefer, Swiss boxing promoter and president of Anthem Sports Group
- Vic Schaefer (born 1961), American basketball coach

== Schäfer ==
Born after 1800

- Dirk Schäfer (1873–1931), Dutch pianist and composer
- Karl Emil Schäfer (1891–1917), German World War I pilot, recipient of the Pour le Mérite
- Wilhelm Schäfer (1868–1952), German naturalist writer and magazine publisher

Born after 1899

- Barbara Schäfer (1934–2024), German politician
- Emanuel Schäfer (1900–1974), German SS officer, head of security police and SD in Serbia during World War II
- Ernst Schäfer (1910–1992), German hunter, zoologist and ornithologist
- Gustav Schäfer (rower) (1906–1991), German Olympic rower
- Hans-Bernd Schäfer (born 1943), German economist and scholar
- Hans Schäfer (1927–2017), German retired footballer
- Karl Heinz Schäfer (1932–1996), German-born composer and arranger working in France
- Karl Schäfer (figure skater) (1909–1976), Austrian Olympic figure skater
- Manfred Schäfer (1943–2023), German-Australian retired professional footballer
- Paul Schäfer (1921–2010), German-Chilean cult leader
- Willy Schäfer (actor) (1933–2011), German actor
- Willy Schäfer (handball player) (1913–1980), Swiss Olympic field handball player
- Wolf Schäfer (born 1942), German-American historian
- Wolfgang Schäfer (born 1945), German choral conductor and academic

Born after 1949

- András Schäfer (born 1999), Hungarian footballer
- Anita Schäfer (born 1951), German politician
- Axel Schäfer (born 1952), German politician
- Bärbel Schäfer (born 1963), German television presenter
- Carolina Schäfer (born 2004), German athlete
- Christian Schäfer (born 1985), German politician
- Christine Schäfer (born 1965), German soprano
- Dagmar Schäfer (born 1968), German sinologist and historian of science
- Florian Schäfer (born 1986), German politician
- Ingo Schäfer (born 1965), German politician
- Jan Schäfer (born 1974), German Olympic canoer
- Klaus Schäfer (catholic theologian) (born 1958), German catholic theologian, priest and author
- Marcel Schäfer (born 1984), German footballer
- Markus Schäfer (born 1961), German tenor
- Michael Schäfer (born 1959), Danish football manager
- Raphael Schäfer (born 1979), German footballer
- Raphael Schäfer (politician) (born 1981), German politician
- Thomas Schäfer (politician) (1966−2020) German lawyer and politician, Minister of Finance in Hesse
- Winfried Schäfer (born 1950), German football manager

== Schäffer ==
Born after 1800

- Saint Anna Schäffer (1882–1925), German mystic, canonized by Pope Benedict in 2012
- Charles Schäffer (1838–1903), American physician and botanist
- Fritz Schäffer (1888–1967), German politician
- Hugo Schäffer (1875–1945), German politician
- Julius Schäffer (1882–1944), German mycologist
- Mary Schäffer Warren (1861–1939), American naturalist, illustrator, and explorer in Canada

Born after 1950

- Andreas Schäffer (born 1984), German footballer
- Frank Schäffer (1952–2024), German footballer
- Verena Schäffer (born 1986), German politician

== Schafer ==
Born after 1800

- Edward Albert Sharpey-Schafer (1850–1935), English physiologist
- Louisa Frederica Adela Schafer (born 1865), English Esperantist, singer, translator and teacher

Born after 1900

- Alice Turner Schafer (1915–2009), American mathematician
- Arthur Schafer (born 1942), Canadian ethicist and academic
- Avi Schafer (born 1998), Japanese basketball player
- Ed Schafer (born 1946), American state politician and United States Secretary of Agriculture

Born after 1950

- Eric Schafer (born 1977), American mixed martial artist
- Harold Schafer (1912–2001), American entrepreneur
- Hunter Schafer (born 1999), American model, activist, and actress
- Jordan Schafer (born 1986), American baseball player
- Natalie Schafer (1900–1991), American actress
- Richard D. Schafer (1918–2014), American mathematician
- Ronald W. Schafer (born 1938), American electrical engineer and academic
- Roy Schafer (1922–2018), American psychologist-psychoanalyst
- R. Murray Schafer (1933–2021), Canadian composer, writer, music educator and environmentalist
- Sakura Schafer-Nameki, German physicist
- Tim Schafer (born 1967), American computer game designer
- Tori Schafer, American politician

== Schaffer ==
Born after 1800

- Alfréd Schaffer (1893–1945), Hungarian footballer
- Károly Schaffer (1864–1939), Hungarian anatomist and neurologist

Born after 1900

- Janne Schaffer (born 1945), Swedish songwriter and guitarist
- Jimmie Schaffer (born 1936), American baseball player

Born after 1950

- Akiva Schaffer (born 1977), American comedy writer and songwriter
- Bob Schaffer (born 1962), American state politician
- Daniel Schaffer (born 1969), British graphic novelist
- Denny Schaffer, American radio personality
- Frank Schaffer (born 1958), East German Olympic athlete
- Gail S. Shaffer (born 1948), American state politician
- Jeff Schaffer (born 1969), American film and television director
- Jon Schaffer (born 1968), American guitarist and songwriter
- Jonathan Schaffer, American-Australian philosopher
- Lewis Schaffer (born 1957), American comedian
- Ken Schaffer (born 1947), American inventor
- Simon Schaffer (born 1955), English academic

== Shafer ==
Born after 1800

- George F. Shafer (1888–1948), American state politician
- Jacob K. Shafer (1823–1876), American national politician
- John Adolph Shafer (1863–1918), American botanist
- Orator Shafer (1851–1922), American baseball player
- Paul W. Shafer (1893–1954), American politician
- Phil Shafer (1891–1971), American racecar driver
- Taylor Shafer (1866–1945), American baseball player
- Tillie Shafer (1889–1962), American baseball player
- William T. Shafer (1825–1882), American politician from Pennsylvania

Born after 1900

- Drew Shafer (1936–1989), American gay rights activist
- Glenn Shafer (born 1946), American mathematician, co-developer of Dempster-Shafer theory
- Raymond P. Shafer (1917–2006), American state politician
- Ruth Shafer (1912–1972), American engineer
- Whitey Shafer (1934–2019), American country songwriter and musician

Born after 1950

- David Shafer (politician) (born 1965), American politician
- Dirk Shafer (1962–2015), American model, actor, screenwriter and director
- Jack Shafer (born 1951), American journalist and columnist
- Jeremy Shafer, American entertainer and origamist
- Justin Shafer (born 1992), American baseball player
- Robert R. Shafer (born 1958), American actor
- Ross Shafer (born 1954), American comedian and motivational speaker
- Scott Shafer (born 1967), American college football coach

== Shaffer ==
Born after 1800

- Shaffer (baseball), baseball player
- Harry G. Shaffer (1885–1971), American state politician
- John Shaffer (1827–1870), American territorial governor
- John D. Shaffer (1858–1931), American politician in Iowa
- John Shaffer (1864–1926), American baseball player
- Joseph Crockett Shaffer (1880–1958), American national politician

Born after 1900

- Anthony Shaffer (writer) (1926–2001), English playwright, novelist, and screenwriter
- David Shaffer (1936–2023), American physician
- Earl Shaffer (1918–2002), American outdoorsman and author
- Elaine Shaffer (1925–1973), American flutist
- Harry G. Shaffer (1919–2009), Austrian-American economics academic
- Jack Shaffer (1909–1963), American basketball player
- James Shaffer (1910–2014), American religious leader
- Jim G. Shaffer (born 1944), American archeology and anthropology academic
- John H. Shaffer (1919–1997), American government administrator
- Juliet Popper Shaffer (born 1932), American psychologist and statistician
- Lee Shaffer (born 1939), American basketball player
- Leland Shaffer (1912–1993), American football player
- Louise Shaffer (born 1942), American actress, scriptwriter, and author
- Mary Shaffer (born 1947), American artist
- Paul Shaffer (born 1949), Canadian-American musician, actor, author, comedian and composer
- Sir Peter Shaffer (1926–2016), English dramatist and playwright
- Robert H. Shaffer (1915–2017), American educator
- Tim Shaffer (1945–2011), American politician

Born after 1950

- Anthony Shaffer (born 1962), American Reserve Army Lieutenant Colonel and CIA intelligence officer
- Atticus Shaffer (born 1998), American actor
- Brenda Shaffer (born c. 1965), American political science author
- Brian Shaffer (born 1979), missing American medical student
- Chris Shaffer, American singer-songwriter
- Deborah Shaffer, American filmmaker
- Erica Shaffer (born 1970), American actress
- James Shaffer (born 1970), American guitarist
- Justin Shaffer (born 1998), American football player
- Kevin Shaffer (born 1980), American football player
- Matthew Shaffer (born 1978), American actor

== See also ==
- Schafferer
- Schieffer
- Sheaffer
- Shepherd (surname)
- Schaap, surname
- Schaper, surname
- Michiel Schapers (born 1959), Dutch tennis player
- Schaps, surname
- Schapira, surname
- Shapira, surname
- Shapiro, surname
