= Stripping reaction =

A stripping reaction may refer to:

- Stripping reaction (physics)
- Stripping reaction (chemistry)
