= Max Robert Schafroth =

Swiss theoretical physicist

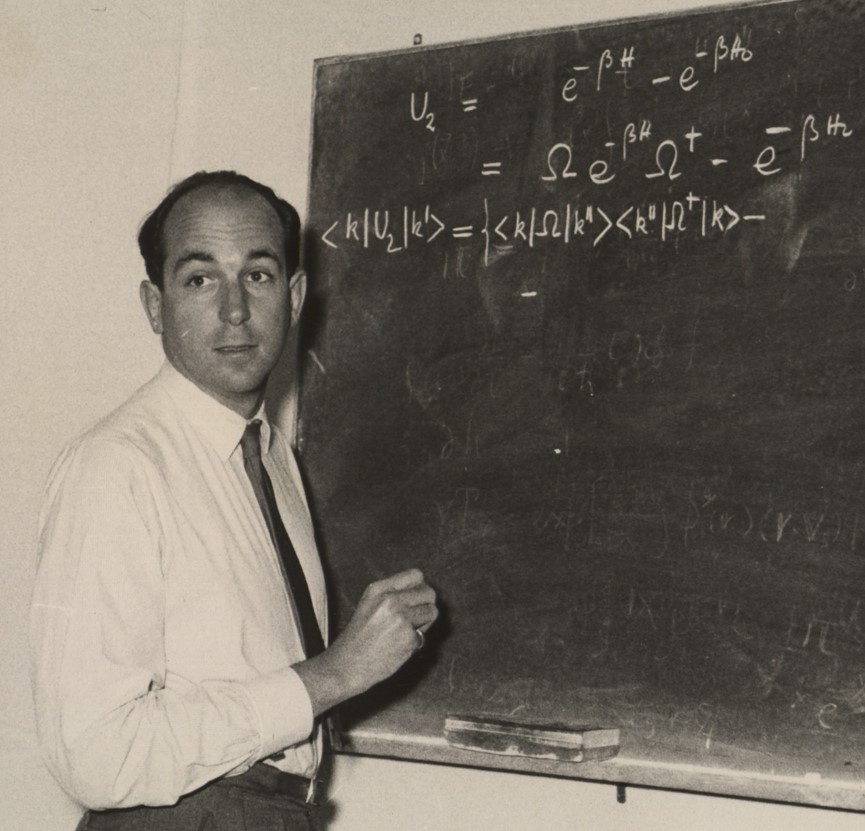
- Robert Schafroth in 1957
- Born: February 8, 1923; Burgdorf, Switzerland
- Died: May 29, 1959 (aged 36); North Queensland, Australia
- Education: Swiss Federal Institute of Technology
- Scientific career
- Fields: Physics
- Workplaces: University of Liverpool; University of Sydney
- Doctoral advisor: Wolfgang Pauli

Max Robert Schafroth (8 February 1923 in Burgdorf, Switzerland – 29 May 1959 in North Queensland, Australia) was a Swiss theoretical physicist who made important contributions to the theory of superconductivity. In 1954, he proposed that electron pairing was the physical mechanism responsible for superconductivity. Working together with John Markus Blatt and Stuart Thomas Butler at the University of Sydney in the 1950s, Schafroth developed a theory that explained superconductivity as a Bose–Einstein condensation of electron pairs, an idea relevant to high-temperature superconductivity.

== Early life and education ==
Schafroth was born in Burgdorf, Switzerland to Colonel Max F. Schafroth and Lydia Schafroth-Oberholzer. He was educated at public schools in Burgdorf and Bern, graduating from the Stadtisches Gymnasium Bern in 1941. His tertiary studies were interrupted by a two-year service in the Swiss army. In 1948, Schafroth received a Diploma in Mathematics and Physics from the Federal Institute of Technology in Zurich. In 1949, he was awarded the title of Doctor of Natural Sciences for his work in theoretical physics under Professor Wolfgang Pauli.

From 1949 to 1953, Schafroth worked as Pauli's assistant, mainly on quantum field theory and the theory of superconductivity. In 1953–1954, funded by a two-year overseas grant from the Schweizer Arbeitsgemeinschaft für Mathematik und Physik, Schafroth was a Research Fellow at the University of Liverpool, working with Herbert Fröhlich on superconductivity.

== University of Sydney and theory of superconductivity ==
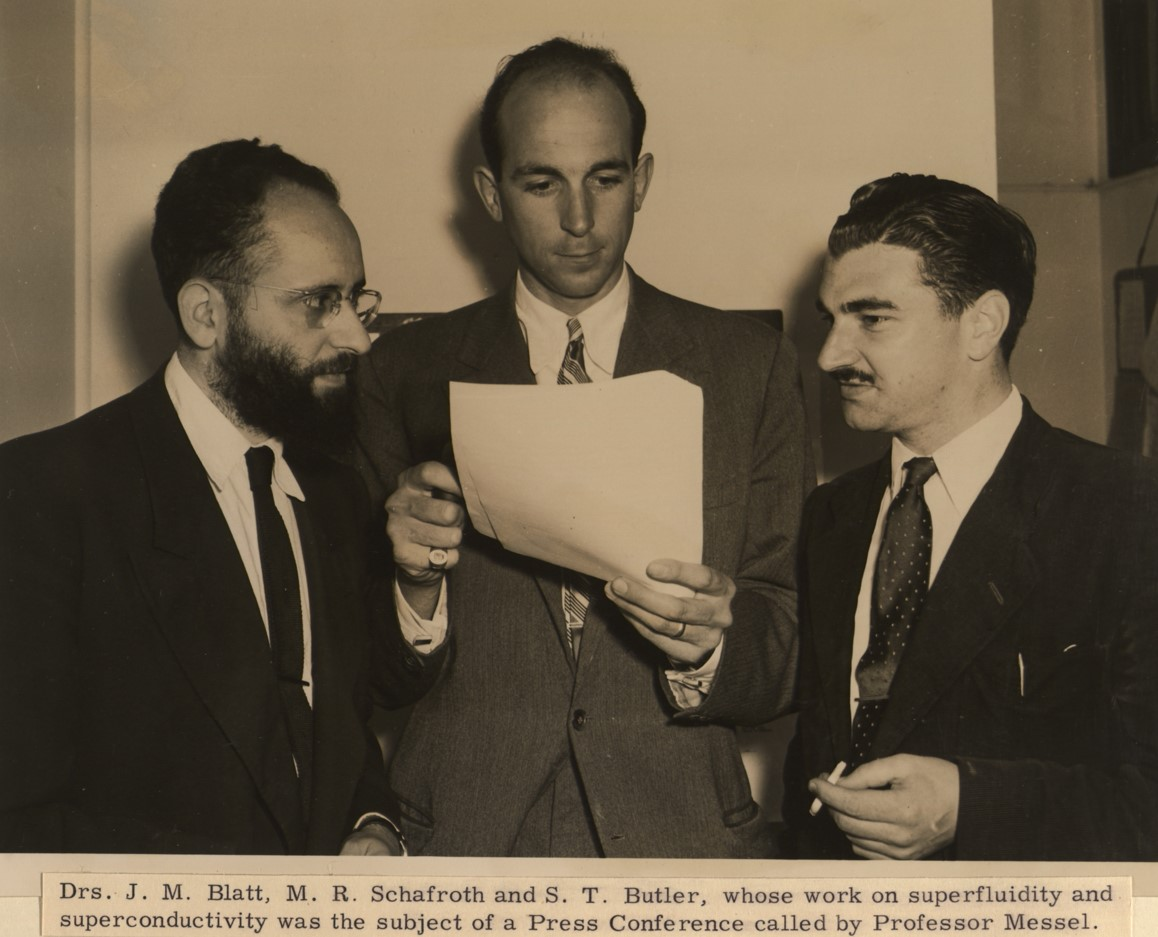
John Blatt, Robert Schafroth and Stuart Butler at the University of Sydney on November 21, 1954

In late 1953, Schafroth accepted the Lecturer position in the then newly expanded School of Physics at the University of Sydney. He arrived in Sydney in early summer 1954. There, he formed a collaboration with John Markus Blatt and Stuart Thomas Butler focused on the theory of superconductivity, theory of superfluidity, and particle physics.

In the fall of 1954, Schafroth published two papers in Physical Review. In the first paper, he proved that an ideal charged Bose gas would exhibit Meissner effect, one of the two main hallmarks of superconductivity. A paper by Blatt and Butler on superfluidity of a (charge-neutral) Bose gas was published in the same issue. After the papers were published, School of Physics's head Harry Messel called a press conference highlighting the group's success. In the second paper, Schafroth suggested that under certain circumstances electrons in a metal could form bound pairs that would approximately behave as bosons. That would lead to superconductivity by virtue of his previous result. The idea of electron pairing as the physical mechanism behind superconductivity was proposed earlier by Richard Ogg Jr. but his paper was not noticed by the physics community. Schafroth was not aware of and did not cite Ogg's work. Later, Ogg's contribution was acknowledged by Blatt.

These early results led to the development of the quasichemical equilibrium theory in which superconductivity was explained as a Bose–Einstein condensation (BEC) of electron pairs. (The BEC idea was also mentioned by Ogg.) Schafroth spent September–December 1955 at the Institute for Advanced Study in Princeton, New Jersey developing the theory and visiting a number of American Universities to promote his, Blatt and Butler's work. In particular, Schafroth visited John Bardeen at the University of Illinois Urbana-Champaign in mid-September and later in November 1955. According to Blatt, during those visits Schafroth had "long and detailed discussions" about his ideas with Leon Cooper who had just joined Bardeen's group. Cooper later recalled

Schafroth, Butler and Blatt had considered a system of charged electron pair molecules whose size was less than the average distance between them so they could be treated as a charged Bose-Einstein gas. They had shown that such a system displayed a Meissner effect and a critical temperature condensation. Schafroth, as I recall, gave a colloquium at Illinois presenting his ideas. I am not sure when that colloquium was given: whether it was before or after my own pair idea. However I was aware of Schafroth's argument by the time I submitted my letter to Physical Review in September 1956.

The quasichemical equilibrium theory was initially submitted to Physical Review but rejected in the original form. Instead of making extensive amendments requested by a sole referee, the paper was sent to Helvetica Physica Acta "in the interest of speedy publication". The manuscript was received on 16 October 1956 and published in June 1957, ahead of the rival theory by Bardeen, Cooper and Robert Schrieffer. After the BCS theory was published, Schafroth criticized its handling of the Meissner effect and a lack of gauge invariance. The underlying difficulty was later removed by Philip Anderson and other researchers, leading to a wide adoption of the BCS theory as the correct description of superconductivity in simple metals and alloys.

Schafroth was promoted to Senior Lecturer at the University of Sydney from January 1, 1955, and later to Reader in Physics from January 1, 1957. On October 10, 1958, Schafroth wrote a letter of resignation from his position as Reader, to take effect from September 1959, in order to take up an appointment as Professor and Chair of Theoretical Physics at the University of Geneva.

== Personal life and accidental death ==
In 1952, Schafroth married Katherli (Kathy) Gemperle in Zurich. They had a son, born on 24 November 1955.

On 29 May 1959, Schafroth and his wife Kathy died in an airplane accident while vacationing in North Queensland, Australia. The crash was described in The Age:

The plane crashed after take-off from the station which is 150 miles north-west of Townsville. Those killed were: Leonard Frederick Holland, 25, married, pilot, of Cairns. Dr. M.R. Schafroth, of Geneva, Switzerland, Reader in Physics at Sydney University and his wife, Kathy. The plane was a four-seater Auster Autocar, owned by Bush Pilots Airways Ltd., of Cairns. Mr. J.H. Atkinson, owner of Green Vale Station, said tonight that he was standing in front of his homestead watching the plane take off. It had risen to 200 feet and 400 yards away when the engine started to flutter. "I could see they were in trouble," he said. "Suddenly the motor stopped. The pilot tried to steer the plane back on to the runway but it swerved and nose-dived into the ground. There was a terrifying crumbling – I knew they were all dead." The bodies of the three victims will be flown to Ingham tomorrow. The aircraft left Cairns at 7 a.m. on the normal mail run to Charters Towers. Dr. and Mrs. Schafroth, who were holidaying in the north, were on their way to Hillgrove station. Pilot Holland joined Bush Pilots last July and had flown about 1000 hours.
