= Wolf Pascheles =

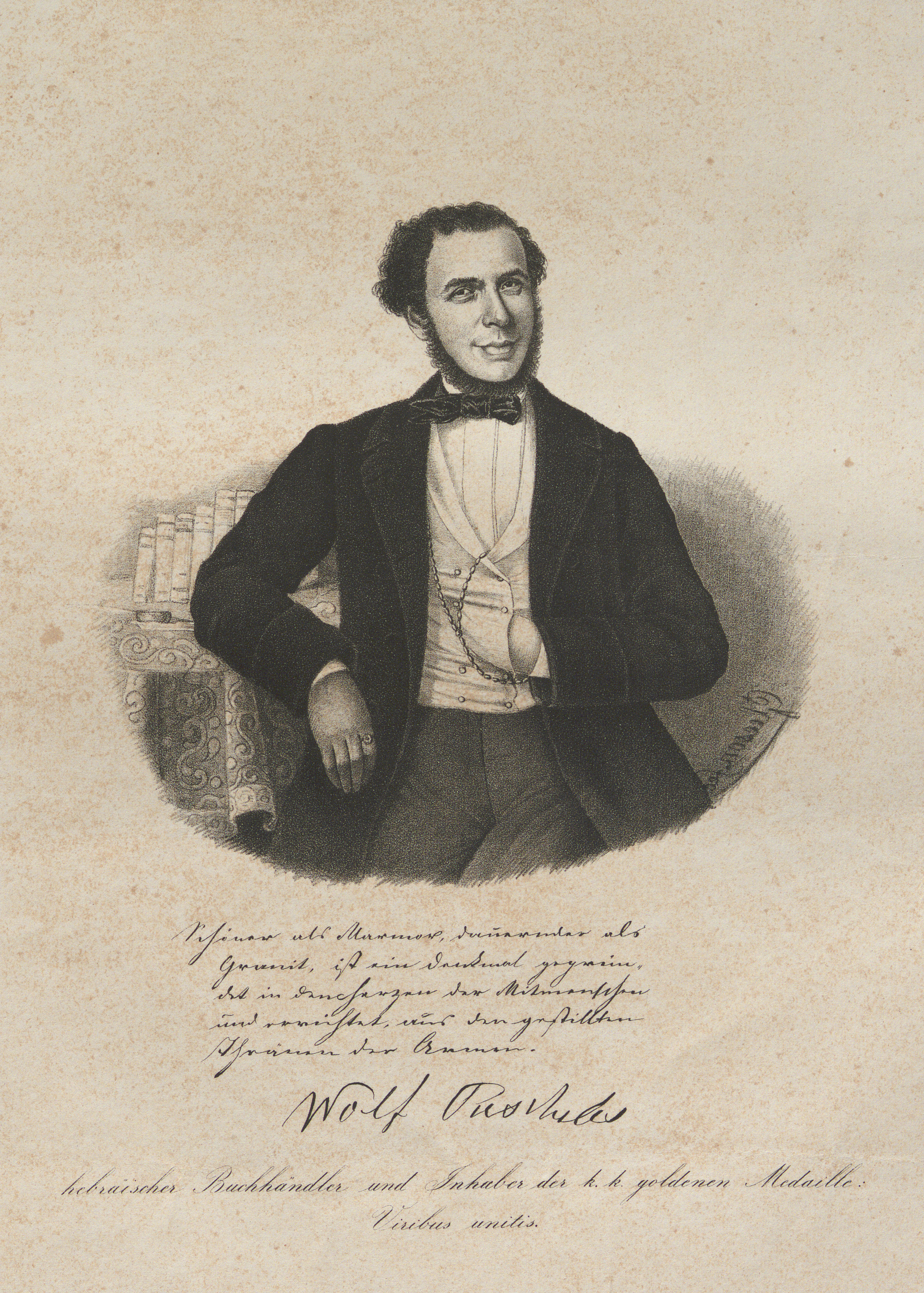
- Wolf Pascheles Portrait

Personal life
- Born: May 11, 1814 Prague, Austrian Empire
- Died: November 22, 1857 (aged 43) Prague, Austrian Empire
- Occupation: Publisher and Businessman

Religious life
- Religion: Judaism

Wolf Pascheles (May 11, 1814 – November 22, 1857) was a Jewish publisher in the Austrian Empire.

== Biography ==
The son of needy parents, he gained a livelihood by tutoring in Prague and its vicinity. Then by an accident he was led to the career which made him famous, that of a seller and publisher of Jewish books. In 1828 he wrote a small book of German prayers for women. When, in 1831, cholera appeared in Prague for the first time, it was ordered by the rabbinate that in this period of greatest suffering the prayers of the seliḥot of Rabbi Eliezer Ashkenazi should be used. These, however, were hard to obtain; so Pascheles had printed his own little book of prayers and the seliḥot in question. When these met with good sales he had some brochures, pictures of rabbis, and things of a similar nature published at his own expense, and carried his entire stock of Hebrew printed matter about with him in a chest.

In 1837 he obtained the right to open a book-shop. In 1846 he began to bring out Jewish folk-sayings, together with biographies of famous Jews, novels, and the like, under the title Sippurim. The first seven volumes sold extensively until the disturbances of the year 1848 interfered with the work; and not until 1852 could Pascheles continue it. Among the contributors to the Sippurim were L. Weisel, Salomon Kohn, I. M. Jost, R. Fürstenthal, and S. I. Kaempf.

From 1852 Pascheles published the Illustrirter Israelitischer Volks-Kalender. The publication of this calendar was later continued in two separate editions respectively by Jacob (afterward by Samuel) Pascheles and Jacob B. Brandeis, Wolf's son-in-law.

In 1853 Pascheles published a small edition of the Pentateuch, with a German translation by H. Arnheim of Glogau. It passed through many editions. Among the other books brought out by him, two of which are widely circulated, are Fanny Neuda's Stunden der Andacht and Guttmann Klemperer's life of Jonathan Eybeschütz.

== Line of descent to Wolfgang Pauli ==
Wolf Pascheles was the great-grandfather of Nobel laureate physicist Wolfgang Ernst Pauli (1900-1958). His son (Pauli's grandfather) was Jacob W. Pascheles (1839-1897), who continued the editorial work of his father. His grandson (Pauli's father) was also named Wolf (or Wolfgang) Joseph Pascheles (1869-1955). He studied medicine, and changed his faith to Catholic and his surname to Pauli in 1898.
