= Anthony Shaffer =

Anthony Shaffer may refer to:

- Anthony Shaffer (writer) (1926–2001), English playwright, novelist, and screenwriter
- Anthony Shaffer (intelligence officer), U.S. Army intelligence officer and memoirist

== See also ==
- Shaffer, surname
