= Schapira =

Schapira is a surname (see Shapiro). Notable people with the surname include:

- Eliezer Isaac Schapira (1835–1915), Hebrew writer and publisher
- Pierre Schapira (politician) (born 1944), French politician
- Pierre Schapira (mathematician) (born 1943), French mathematician
- David Schapira (born 1980), American politician

== See also ==
- Shapiro (surname), article; variants:
  - Shapira, list
  - Schapiro, list
  - Shapero, list
- Speyer, city in Germany; name Shapira etc. based in it
- Schaap, surname
- Schaper, surname
- Michiel Schapers (b. 1959), Dutch tennis player
- Schaps, surname
- Schäfer/Schaefer/Schafer/Schaeffer etc., surname
