= Francis Egbokhare =

Nigerian academic and linguist (born 1962)

Professor Francis Egbokhare
- Born: Francis Oisaghaede Egbokhare; 22 September 1963 (age 63); Ibadan, Oyo State, Nigeria
- Education: University of Ibadan, University of Benin
- Occupations: Linguist, Professor, Scholar
- Employer: University of Ibadan
- Partner: Olayinka Egbokhare
- Children: 2

Francis Egbokhare (born 22 September 1962) is a prolific scholar, academic linguist, writer, and professor from Nigeria, and a fellow and the immediate past president of the Nigerian Academy of Letters. He has held positions at the University of Ibadan for many years as a professor of linguistics and as Director of the Distance Learning Centre. He lives in Ibadan.

== Bio and academic career ==
Born Francis Oisaghaede Egbokhare from Afuze in Edo State, he attended St John’s primary School, Igarra, Edo State, between 1967 and 1972, and then St. Gabriel Primary School, Agenebode, also in Edo State, between 1972 and 1973. He proceeded to Otaru Grammar School, Auchi, between 1973 and 1978, and to Edaiken Grammar School, Okhuaihe, Benin City, from 1978 to 1979. He attended the University of Benin for his BA degree (1979–1983), and the University of Ibadan for his MA (1985) and PhD in 1990.

While at the University of Benin, he met and began to work with American professor Ronald P. Schaefer with whom he went on to have a long and sustained collaboration over thirty years, and published about 35 books and essays on Emai, his mother tongue, in the space of 20 years.

From 1985 to 1988, Egbokhare was Assistant Lecturer in the Department of Linguistics and African Languages, University of Ibadan. From 1988 to 1991, he became Lecturer II in the same department. From 1991 to 1994, he became Lecturer I, and from 1994 to 1999 a Senior Lecturer. In 1999, he became a full Professor of Linguistics in the same department, becoming one of the youngest professors in the university at age 37.

His research areas are in Ethics, Historical Linguistics, and Syntax. His columns in Nigeria's national newspapers under the title "Preying Mantis" focuses on education, politics, integrity in public service, faith, language, among others. In collaboration with Professor R. P. Schaefer, he has produced a 552-page Dictionary of Emai (2007) and two volumes of oral tradition narratives running to 1,261 pages.

Egbokhare is a fellow of the Nigerian Academy of Letters.

In 2010, he was shortlisted with five others vying to become the Vice Chancellor of the university.

== Head of the Distance Learning Centre ==
In 2004, Egbokhare assumed office as Director of the University of Ibadan's Distance Learning Centre (DLC). At this time, the Centre had no impact on the financial and administrative operations of the University. It had only 800 students at a point and was barely able to cover its financial needs. Under his leadership, DLC surpassed the university's Postgraduate School in contributions to the internally generated revenue of the University. At the end of my tenure, it had cash savings of more than 800 million naira and significant assets and investments.

The DLC pioneered e-learning delivery, web based, radio based delivery, computer-based testing, student support operations in addition to developing and digitalizing 564 Courseware and Learning materials. The total student population grew under him to about 15,000, more than either of the undergraduate or postgraduate student population of the University of Ibadan. He engaged in extensive regulatory reforms, change management training, capacity building and program expansion (which increased from 6 to 38) with the support of Senate and Management. He mobilized academic and non-academic staff to move the DLC from obscurity (derisively regarded as Siberia) to the foremost Distance Learning operation in Africa. The DLC contributed enormously to and enhanced the positive evaluation of UI all over the world.

A paper he co-wrote titled "Learners Acceptance of the Use of Mobile Phones to Deliver Tutorials in a Distance Learning Context: A Case Study at the University of Ibadan" (in The African Journal of Information Systems, Vol. 5, No 3:80–93) has been downloaded more than eight hundred and fifty times.

== Personal life ==
Egbokhare lives in Ibadan with his wife, Olayinka Egbokhare, and their two children.

== Selected publications ==
=== Books ===
- Egbokhare F. O. 2003. Practical Course in Pronunciation. Ibadan: Quasar Solutions.
- Egbokhare F. O. 2007. Fundamentals of Oral English for Schools and Colleges. Ibadan: Stirling-Horden Publishers Nigeria Limited.
- Egbokhare, F. O. 1994. Introductory Phonetics. Ibadan: Sam Bookman Publishers
- Egbokhare, F. O. 1998. Oral English: A linguistic Approach. Ibadan: Sam Bookman Publishers.
- Egbokhare. F. O., and C. O. Kolawole, 2006. Globalisation and the Future of African Languages. Ibadan: Alafas Nigeria Company.
- Egbokhare et al. (eds); 2011, Edo North: Field Studies of the Languages and Land of the Northern Edo. pp. 121–130. Ibadan: Zenith Book House.
- Egbokhare, F. O. 2024. A Dictionary of Naija: Nigerian Pidgin Dictionary. Ibadan: Zenith Bookhouse.
- Fundamentals of Oral English for Schools and Colleges (Stirling-Horden, 2007).
- Schaefer R. P., and F. O. Egbokhare (in press). A Reference Grammar of Emai. Mouton: The Hague
- Schaefer, R. P., and F. O. Egbokhare, 1999. "Oral Narrative Samples of the Emai People". Part I and II Hamburg:LIT.
- Schaefer, R. P., and F. O. Egbokhare, 2007. A Dictionary of Emai: An Edoid Language of Nigeria. Cologne: Westafrikanische Studien, Rudiger Koppe Verlag.

=== Papers ===
- Egbokhare, F. O. 1990. "Nasality in Emai". Afrika Und Ubersee. Hamburg: University of Hamburg. 2.73. 22–31.
- Egbokhare, F. O. 1990. "Reduplication as Repetition: An Account of the process in Emai". Research in African Languages in Linguistics, Ibadan 1.1. 73–84.
- Egbokhare, F. O. 1990. "Tone and the NP in Emai". In F. Ingemann (ed.), Proceedings of the 1990 Mid-America Linguistics Conference. Kansas: University of Kansas. 92-103
- Egbokhare, F. O. 1990. "Vowel Elision in Emai". Afrika Und Ubersee. Hamburg: University of Hamburg. 1.73. 58-69
- Egbokhare, F. O. 1992. "Tone and Subjects of Emai Sentences". In F. Ingemann (ed.), Proceedings of the 1990 Mid-America Linguistics Conference. Kansas: University of Kansas. 1-14.
- Egbokhare, F. O. 1994. "From Fines to Figures: Socio-Economic Dynamics and the Development of Emai Counting System". In D. K. O. Owolabi (ed.), Language in Nigeria: Essays in Honour of Bamgbose, Ibadan: Group Publishers 408–423
- Egbokhare, F. O. 1994. "The Form and Meaning of Nominalization in Emai". Afrika Und Ubersee. Hamburg: University of Hamburg. 77/2. 174–196
- Egbokhare, F. O. 1998. "Tone and the NP in Emai Revisited". Research in African Languages and Linguistics. Ibadan: Nigeria. 4.2. 69–86
