= Eliezer Isaac Schapira =

Jewish Polish publisher and writer (1835–1915)

- אליעזר יצחק שׁפירא
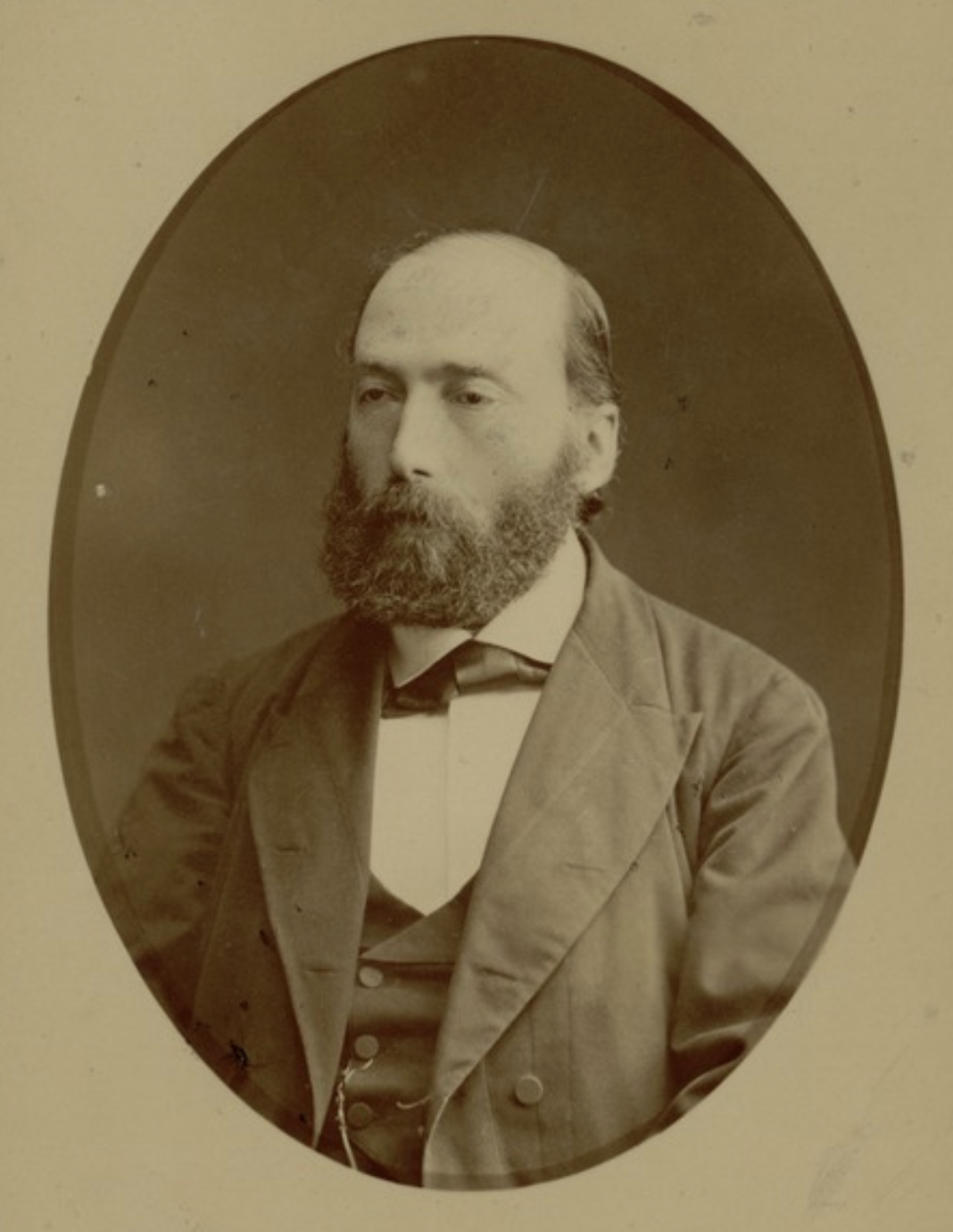
- Portrait by Constantin Shapiro
- Born: 6 November 1835; Sereje, Suwałki Governorate, Congress Poland
- Died: March 1915 (aged 79); Warsaw, Congress Poland
- Writing career
- Pen name: Ish (אי״ש)
- Language: Hebrew
- Literary movement: Haskalah

Eliezer Isaac Schapira (Hebrew: אליעזר יצחק שׁפירא, romanized: Eliʻezer Yitsḥak Shapira; 6 November 1835 – March 1915) was a Jewish Polish writer, translator, and publisher.

== Biography ==
Eliezer Isaac Schapira was born in 1835 in Sereje, Suwałki Governorate, and studied at the yeshiva of Sejny before moving to Augustów to study with his uncle, a rabbi in that city. Under the influence of his relative T. P. Schapira, he became a Hebrew teacher and a proponent of the Haskalah.

In 1874, Schapira settled in Warsaw, where he opened the first publishing house for children's and young people's Hebrew literature. He would become the main publisher and distributor of the works of Judah Leib Gordon. He meanwhile contributed his own articles and translations to Ha-Maggid, Ha-Tsfira, Ha-Melitz, Ha-Yom, and Ha-Asif, and for a time edited the periodical Ha-Boker Or.

== Selected publications ==
- Mikhtavim ba-sefer. Warsaw: Y. Goldman. 1871.
- Meged yeraḥim. Vol. 1–2. Warsaw: Y. Goldman. 1871. Collection of translated stories.
- Bet ha-otsar. Vol. 1–2. Warsaw: Y. Goldman. 1875.
- Yad ḥarutsim. Warsaw: A. Ginz. 1879.
- Reshimat sifre Haskalah. Warsaw: Ḥ. Kelter. 1883.
- Ha-podeh u-matsil. Warsaw. 1885. Translation of Salomon Kohn's novel Gallerie der Sippurim.
