= Schaps =

Schaps is a surname. Notable people with the surname include:

- Eric Schaps (born 1942), education researcher
- Mary Schaps (born 1948), Israeli-American mathematician

== See also ==
- Schaap
- Schäfer/Schaefer/Schafer/Schaeffer etc., surname
- Schaper, surname
- Michiel Schapers (b. 1959), Dutch tennis player
- Schapira, surname
- Shapira, surname
- Shapiro, surname
- Shapiro, surname
