= Schaap =

Schaap is a Dutch metonymic surname meaning "sheep". Notable people with the surname include:

- Annet Schaap (born 1965), Dutch illustrator and writer
- Christopher Schaap (born 1991), American filmmaker
- Dick Schaap (1934–2001), American sportswriter, broadcaster and author
- Fritz Schaap (born 1981), German Journalist, war reporter
- Jan Schaap (1893–1963), early Dutch scoutmaster
- Jeremy Schaap (born 1969), American sportswriter, television reporter
- Michael Schaap (1874–1957), New York assemblyman, and president of Bloomingdale's
- Paul Schaap (born 1950), Dutch whistleblower and journalist
- Peter Schaap (1946–2025), Dutch singer and writer
- Phil Schaap (1951–2021), American jazz radio personality
- Ruud Schaap (born 1946), Dutch singer and guitarist

== See also ==
- Schäfer/Schaefer/Schafer/Schaeffer etc., surname
- Schaper, surname
- Michiel Schapers (b. 1959), Dutch tennis player
- Schaps, surname
- Schapira, surname
- Shapira, surname
- Shapiro, surname
- Shapiro, surname
