= Hertha Pauli =

Austrian journalist, writer and actress

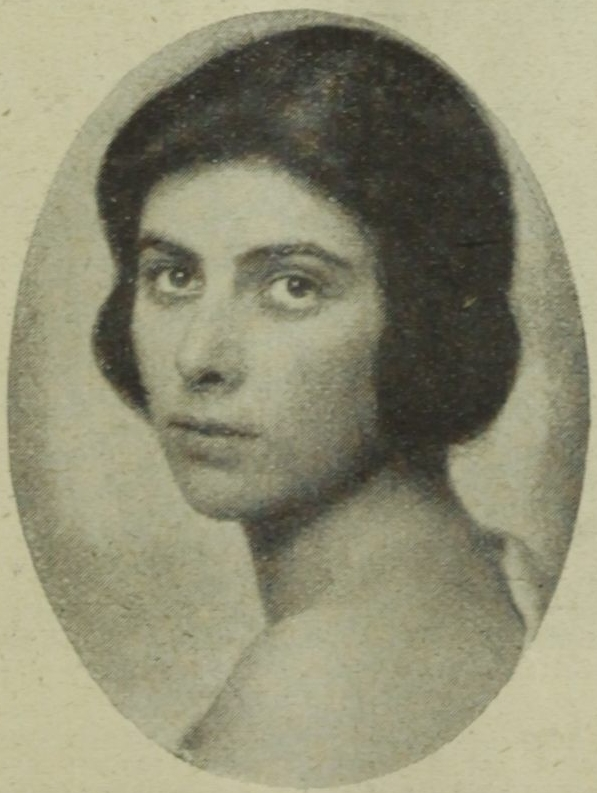
- Born: Hertha Ernestine Pauli; September 4, 1906; Vienna, Austria-Hungary
- Died: February 9, 1973 (aged 66); Bay Shore, New York, U.S.
- Occupations: Journalist, writer, actress
- Spouse(s): Carl Behr; E.B. Ashton
- Relatives: Wolfgang Pauli (brother)

Hertha Ernestine Pauli (September 4, 1906 – February 9, 1973) was an Austrian journalist, writer and actress.

== Biography ==
Hertha Ernestine Pauli was born in Vienna, the daughter of feminist Bertha Schütz and chemist Wolfgang Pauli. Her brother was Wolfgang Pauli, who was awarded the Nobel Prize in Physics in 1945.

From 1927-33, she played different small roles at the Max Reinhardt Theatre in Berlin and was allied with Ödön von Horváth. From 1933-38, she lived in Vienna, edited the "Österreichische Korrespondenz" and published biographical novels, for example about the feminist Bertha von Suttner.

After the Anschluss, she immigrated to France. In Paris, she belonged to the circle of Joseph Roth, knew the American journalist Eric Sevareid, and wrote for Resistance. In 1940, after the Nazis occupied France, she fled with writer Walter Mehring through Marseille, the Pyrenees and Lisbon. With the aid of Varian Fry and the Emergency Rescue Committee, she made her way to the United States.

After her arrival in the U.S., she described her flight in the journal Aufbau.

In the following years she wrote books about Alfred Nobel and the Statue of Liberty. Her books for children, in particular, had some success. These books included Silent Night. The Story of a Song (1943), in which she explained the origin of the carol.

She married Ernst Basch (pen name, E.B. Ashton), with whom she had collaborated on I Lift My Lamp. Her last book was autobiographical and described the time after the Nazi's union with France.

== Death ==
She died in Bay Shore, New York on February 9, 1973, aged 66.

== Works ==
- Toni. Ein Frauenleben für Ferdinand Raimund, 1936
- Nur eine Frau. Bertha von Suttner, 1937
- Alfred Nobel, Dynamite King, Architect of Peace, 1942
- Silent Night. The Story of a Song, 1943
- Story of the Christmas Tree, 1944
- St. Nicholas Travels, 1946
- I Lift my Lamp, The Way of a Symbol, 1948
- The Golden Door, 1949
- Three Is a Family, 1955
- Bernadette and the Lady, 1956
- Her Name Was Sojourner Truth, 1962
- The Secret of Sarajevo: The Story of Franz Ferdinand and Sophie, 1966
- Pietro and Brother Francis, 1971
- Break of Time, 1972
