= Laura Schaefer =

Laura Schaefer may refer to:

- Laura A. Schaefer, American mechanical engineer
- Laura K. Schaefer, American planetary scientist
