= Wolfgang Pauli =

Austrian physicist (1900–1958)

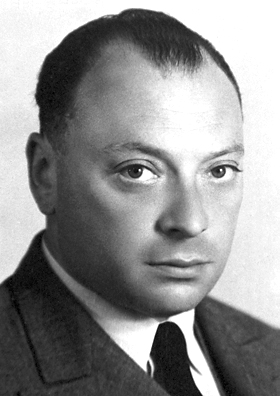
- Pauli in 1945
- Born: Wolfgang Ernst Pauli; 25 April 1900; Vienna, Austria-Hungary
- Died: 15 December 1958 (aged 58); Zurich, Switzerland
- Citizenship: Austria; United States (nat. 1946); Switzerland (nat. 1949)
- Education: LMU Munich (grad. 1921)
- Known for: Pauli exclusion principle; Pauli matrices; Pauli equation; Pauli paramagnetism; Pauli–Villars regularization; Pauli–Jung conjecture; Schwinger-Lüders-Pauli Theorem; Pauli group; Pauli-Lubanski pseudovector; Postulating the neutrino
- Spouses: Käthe Deppner (m. 1929; div. 1930) Franziska Bertram (m. 1934)
- Relatives: Wolf Pascheles (paternal great-grandfather); Friedrich Schütz (maternal grandfather); Hertha Pauli (sister)
- Awards: Lorentz Medal (1931); Nobel Prize in Physics (1945); Franklin Medal (1952); Matteucci Medal (1956); Max Planck Medal (1958)
- Scientific career
- Fields: Physics
- Workplaces: University of Hamburg; ETH Zurich; Institute for Advanced Study
- Thesis: Über das Modell des Wasserstoffmolekülions (1921)
- Doctoral advisor: Arnold Sommerfeld
- Doctoral students: Charles Enz; Max Robert Schafroth
- Other notable students: Felix Villars

Notes
- His godfather was Ernst Mach. He is not to be confused with Wolfgang Paul, who called Pauli his "imaginary part", a pun with the imaginary unit i.

Wolfgang Ernst Friedrich Pauli (Note: /ˈpɔːli/ PAW-lee or /ˈpaʊli/ POW-lee; German: [ˈpaʊ̯li]) (25 April 1900 – 15 December 1958) was an Austrian theoretical physicist and a pioneer of quantum mechanics. In 1945, after having been nominated by Albert Einstein, Pauli received the Nobel Prize in Physics "for the discovery of the Exclusion Principle, also called the Pauli Principle". The discovery involved spin theory, which is the basis of a theory of the structure of matter.

To preserve the conservation of energy in beta decay, Pauli proposed the existence of the neutrino in 1930. Neutrinos were first detected in 1956.

== Biography ==
Wolfgang Ernst Friedrich Pauli was born on 25 April 1900 in Vienna, the son of Wolfgang Josef Pauli (né Pascheles) and Bertha Camilla Schütz. His sister was Hertha Pauli, a writer and actress. His middle name was given in honor of his godfather, physicist Ernst Mach. His second middle name Friedrich was after his grandfather Friedrich Schütz. His paternal grandparents were from prominent Jewish families of Prague; his great-grandfather was the Jewish publisher Wolf Pascheles. His father had changed his surname to Pauli upon converting to Catholicism. His mother Bertha was raised in her mother's Roman Catholic faith; her father was Jewish writer Friedrich Schütz. Pauli was also raised as a Roman Catholic.

Pauli attended the Döblinger-Gymnasium in Vienna, graduating with distinction in 1918. Two months later, he published his first paper, on Albert Einstein's theory of general relativity. He studied under Arnold Sommerfeld at LMU Munich, where he received his Ph.D. in 1921 with a thesis on the quantum theory of ionized diatomic hydrogen (H^{+}_{2}).

Sommerfeld asked Pauli to review the theory of relativity for Klein's Encyclopedia of Mathematical Sciences. Two months after receiving his doctorate, Pauli completed the article, which came to 237 pages. Einstein praised it and published it as a monograph. It remains a standard reference on the subject.

Pauli spent a year at the University of Göttingen as an assistant to Max Born, and the following year at the University of Copenhagen.

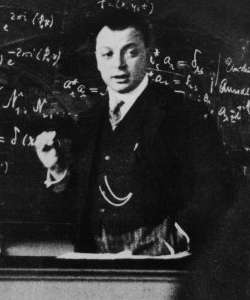
Wolfgang Pauli lecturing (1929)

From 1923 to 1928, Pauli was a lecturer at the University of Hamburg. During this period, he was instrumental in the development of the modern theory of quantum mechanics. In particular, he formulated the exclusion principle and the theory of nonrelativistic spin.

In 1928, Pauli was appointed Professor of Theoretical Physics at ETH Zurich in Switzerland. He was awarded the Lorentz Medal in 1930. He held visiting professorships at the University of Michigan in 1931 and the Institute for Advanced Study in Princeton in 1935.

In 1929, Pauli married Käthe Margarethe Deppner, a cabaret dancer. The marriage was unhappy, ending in divorce after less than a year. He remarried in 1934 to Franziska "Franca" Bertram.

The German annexation of Austria in 1938 made Pauli a German citizen, which became a problem for him in 1939 when World War II broke out. Under the Nazi regime's Nuremberg Laws, his three Jewish grandparents led to him being classified as Jewish, putting him in grave danger. In 1940, he tried in vain to obtain Swiss citizenship, which would have allowed him to remain at the ETH. The same year, he moved to the United States and was appointed Professor of Theoretical Physics at the Institute for Advanced Study. In 1946, he became a naturalized U.S. citizen and returned to Zurich, where he remained for the rest of his life. In 1949, he was granted Swiss citizenship.

In 1958, Pauli was awarded the Max Planck Medal. The same year, he fell ill with pancreatic cancer. When his last assistant, Charles Enz, visited him at the Rotkreuz hospital in Zurich, Pauli asked him, "Did you see the room number?" It was 137. Throughout his life, Pauli had been preoccupied with the question of why the fine-structure constant, a dimensionless fundamental constant, has a value nearly equal to 1/137. Pauli died in that room on 15 December 1958.

His widow Franziska donated Pauli's personal archives, including his Nobel Prize medal, to CERN in 1960 and 1971.

== Research ==
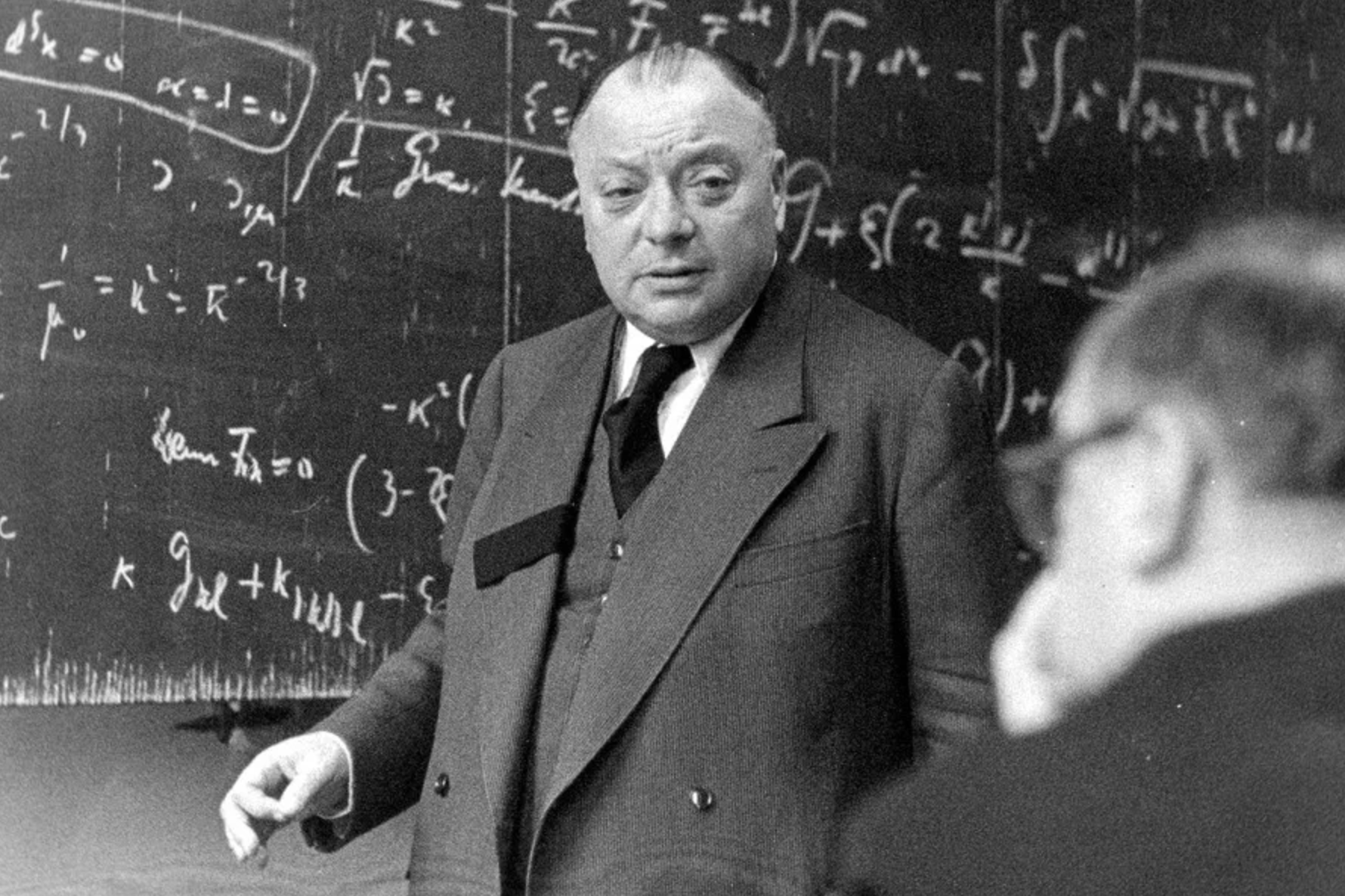
Wolfgang Pauli 1953

Pauli made many important contributions as a physicist, primarily in the field of quantum mechanics. He seldom published papers, preferring lengthy correspondences with colleagues such as Niels Bohr from the University of Copenhagen in Denmark and Werner Heisenberg, with whom he had close friendships. Many of his ideas and results were never published and appeared only in his letters, which were often copied and circulated by their recipients. In 1921 Pauli worked with Bohr to create the Aufbau Principle, which described building up electrons in shells based on the German word for building up, as Bohr was also fluent in German.

Pauli proposed in 1924 a new quantum degree of freedom (or quantum number) with two possible values, to resolve inconsistencies between observed molecular spectra and the developing theory of quantum mechanics. He formulated the Pauli exclusion principle, perhaps his most important work, which stated that no two electrons could exist in the same quantum state, identified by four quantum numbers including his new two-valued degree of freedom. The idea of spin originated with Ralph Kronig. A year later, George Uhlenbeck and Samuel Goudsmit identified Pauli's new degree of freedom as electron spin, in which Pauli for a very long time wrongly refused to believe.

In 1926, shortly after Heisenberg published the matrix theory of modern quantum mechanics, Pauli used it to derive the observed spectrum of the hydrogen atom. This result was important in securing credibility for Heisenberg's theory.

Pauli introduced the 2×2 Pauli matrices as a basis of spin operators, thus solving the nonrelativistic theory of spin. This work, including the Pauli equation, is sometimes said to have influenced Paul Dirac in his creation of the Dirac equation for the relativistic electron, though Dirac said that he invented these same matrices himself independently at the time. Dirac invented similar but larger (4x4) spin matrices for use in his relativistic treatment of fermionic spin.

In 1930, Pauli considered the problem of beta decay. In a letter of 4 December to Lise Meitner et al., beginning, "Dear radioactive ladies and gentlemen", he proposed the existence of a hitherto unobserved neutral particle with a small mass, no greater than 1% the mass of a proton, to explain the continuous spectrum of beta decay. In 1934, Enrico Fermi incorporated the particle, which he called a neutrino, "little neutral one" in Fermi's native Italian, into his theory of beta decay. The neutrino was first confirmed experimentally in 1956 by Frederick Reines and Clyde Cowan, two and a half years before Pauli's death. On receiving the news, he replied by telegram: "Thanks for message. Everything comes to him who knows how to wait. Pauli."

In 1933 Pauli published the second part of his book on physics, Handbuch der Physik, which was considered the definitive book on the new field of quantum physics. Robert Oppenheimer called it "the only adult introduction to quantum mechanics."

In 1940, Pauli re-derived the spin-statistics theorem, a critical result of quantum field theory that states that particles with half-integer spin are fermions, while particles with integer spin are bosons.

In 1949, he published a paper on Pauli–Villars regularization: regularization is the term for techniques that modify infinite mathematical integrals to make them finite during calculations, so that one can identify whether the intrinsically infinite quantities in the theory (mass, charge, wavefunction) form a finite and hence calculable set that can be redefined in terms of their experimental values, which criterion is termed renormalization, and which removes infinities from quantum field theories, but also importantly allows the calculation of higher-order corrections in perturbation theory.

Pauli made repeated criticisms of the modern synthesis of evolutionary biology, and his contemporary admirers point to modes of epigenetic inheritance as supporting his arguments.

Paul Drude in 1900 proposed the first theoretical model for a classical electron moving through a metallic solid. Drude's classical model was also augmented by Pauli and other physicists. Pauli realized that the free electrons in metal must obey the Fermi–Dirac statistics. Using this idea, he developed the theory of paramagnetism in 1926. Pauli said, "Festkörperphysik ist eine Schmutzphysik"—solid-state physics is the physics of dirt.

== Personality and friendships ==
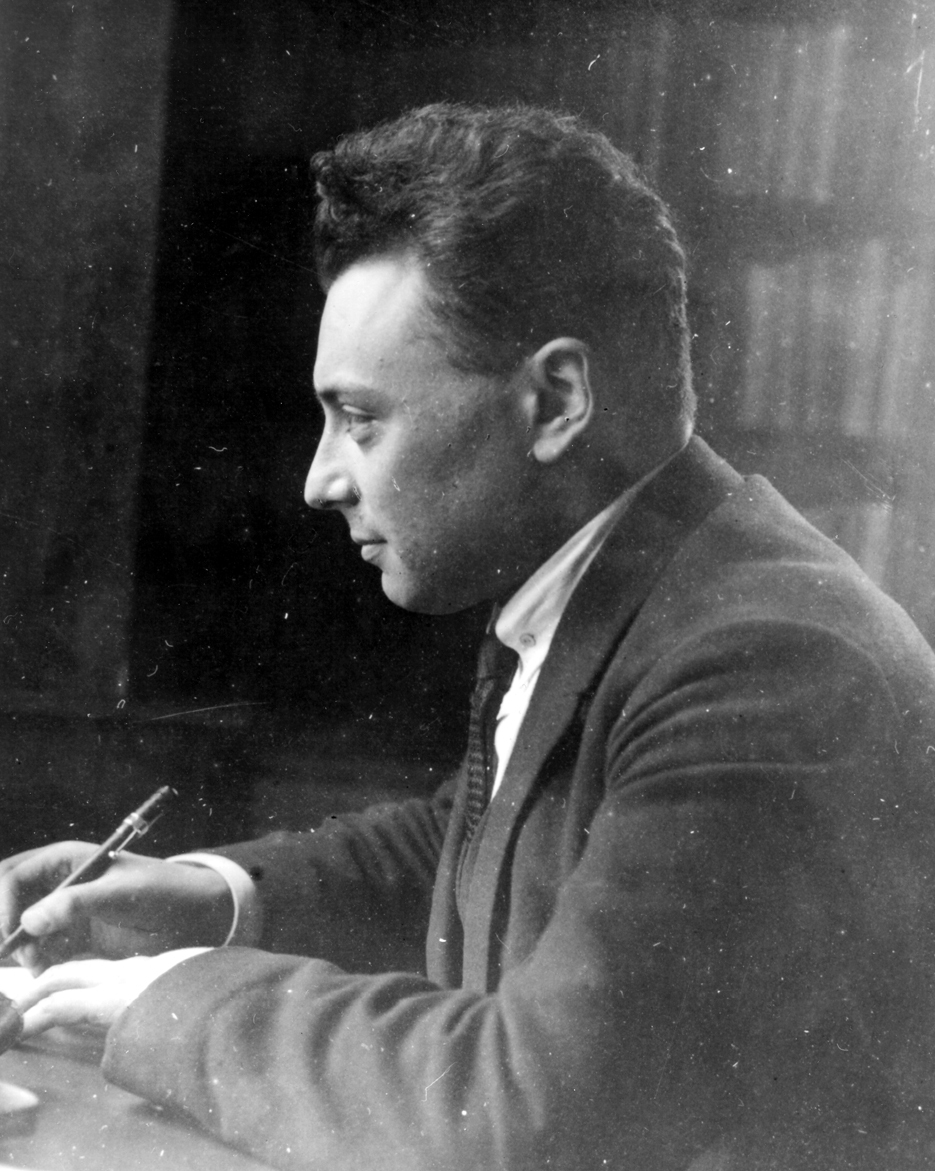
Wolfgang Pauli, c. 1924

The Pauli effect was named after his anecdotal bizarre ability to break experimental equipment simply by being in its vicinity. Pauli was aware of his reputation and was delighted whenever the Pauli effect manifested. These strange occurrences were in line with his controversial investigations into the legitimacy of parapsychology, particularly his collaboration with C. G. Jung on synchronicity. Max Born considered Pauli "only comparable to Einstein himself... perhaps even greater". Einstein declared Pauli his "spiritual heir".

Pauli was famously a perfectionist. This extended not just to his own work, but also to that of his colleagues. As a result, he became known in the physics community as the "conscience of physics", the critic to whom his colleagues were accountable. He could be scathing in his dismissal of any theory he found lacking, often labelling it ganz falsch, "utterly wrong".

But this was not his most severe criticism, which he reserved for theories or theses so unclearly presented as to be untestable or unevaluatable and thus not properly belonging within the realm of science, even though posing as such. They were worse than wrong because they could not be proved wrong. Famously, he once said of such an unclear paper: "It is not even wrong!"

His supposed remark when meeting another leading physicist, Paul Ehrenfest, illustrates this notion of an arrogant Pauli. The two met at a conference for the first time. Ehrenfest was familiar with Pauli's papers and quite impressed with them. After a few minutes of conversation, Ehrenfest remarked, "I think I like your Encyclopedia article [on relativity theory] better than I like you," to which Pauli retorted, "That's strange. With me, regarding you, it is just the opposite." The two became very good friends from then on.

A somewhat warmer picture emerges from this story, which appears in the article on Dirac:

Werner Heisenberg [in Physics and Beyond, 1971] recollects a friendly conversation among young participants at the 1927 Solvay Conference, about Einstein and Planck's views on religion. Wolfgang Pauli, Heisenberg, and Dirac took part in it. Dirac's contribution was a poignant and clear criticism of the political manipulation of religion, that was much appreciated for its lucidity by Bohr, when Heisenberg reported it to him later. Among other things, Dirac said: "I cannot understand why we idle discussing religion. If we are honest – and as scientists honesty is our precise duty – we cannot help but admit that any religion is a pack of false statements, deprived of any real foundation. The very idea of God is a product of human imagination. [ ... ] I do not recognize any religious myth, at least because they contradict one another. [ ... ]" Heisenberg's view was tolerant. Pauli had kept silent, after some initial remarks. But when finally he was asked for his opinion, jokingly he said: "Well, I'd say that also our friend Dirac has got a religion and the first commandment of this religion is 'God does not exist and Paul Dirac is his prophet'". Everybody burst into laughter, including Dirac.

Many of Pauli's ideas and results were never published and appeared only in his letters, which were often copied and circulated by their recipients. Pauli may have been unconcerned that much of his work thus went uncredited, but when it came to Heisenberg's world-renowned 1958 lecture at Göttingen on their joint work on a unified field theory, and the press release calling Pauli a mere "assistant to Professor Heisenberg", Pauli became offended, denouncing Heisenberg's physics prowess. The deterioration of their relationship resulted in Heisenberg ignoring Pauli's funeral, and writing in his autobiography that Pauli's criticisms were overwrought, though ultimately the field theory was proved untenable, validating Pauli's criticisms.

George Gamow wrote that "it is just as difficult to find the branch of modern physics in which the Pauli Principle is not used as to find a man as gifted, amiable, and amusing as Wolfgang Pauli was."

=== Carl Gustav Jung ===
At the end of 1930, immediately after his divorce and his mother's death, Pauli experienced a personal crisis. In January 1932, he consulted psychiatrist and psychotherapist Carl Gustav Jung, who also lived near Zurich. Jung immediately began interpreting Pauli's deeply archetypal dreams and Pauli became a collaborator of Jung's. He soon began to critique the epistemology of Jung's theory scientifically, and this contributed to a certain clarification of Jung's ideas, especially about synchronicity. A great many of these discussions are documented in the Pauli/Jung letters, today published as Atom and Archetype. Jung's elaborate analysis of more than 400 of Pauli's dreams is documented in Psychology and Alchemy.

== Philosophy and religion ==
In his discussions with Carl Jung, Pauli developed an ontological theory that has been dubbed the "Pauli–Jung Conjecture" and has been seen as a kind of dual-aspect theory. The theory holds that there is "a psychophysically neutral reality" and that mental and physical aspects are derivative of this reality. Pauli thought that elements of quantum physics pointed to a deeper reality that might explain the mind/matter gap and wrote, "we must postulate a cosmic order of nature beyond our control to which both the outward material objects and the inward images are subject."

Pauli and Jung held that this reality was governed by common principles ("archetypes") that appear as psychological phenomena or as physical events. They also held that synchronicities might reveal some of this underlying reality's workings.

Pauli is considered to have been a deist and a mystic. In No Time to Be Brief: A Scientific Biography of Wolfgang Pauli, he is quoted as writing to science historian Shmuel Sambursky, "In opposition to the monotheist religions – but in unison with the mysticism of all peoples, including the Jewish mysticism – I believe that the ultimate reality is not personal."

== Recognition ==
As a Foreign Member, Pauli was elected to the Royal Society in 1953 and the Royal Netherlands Academy of Arts and Sciences in 1958.

=== Awards ===
Year	Award	Organization	Citation	Ref.
1931	Lorentz Medal	Royal Netherlands Academy of Arts and Sciences	—	
1945	Nobel Prize in Physics	(Sweden) Royal Swedish Academy of Sciences	"For the discovery of the Exclusion Principle, also called the Pauli Principle."	
1952	Franklin Medal	(United States) Franklin Institute	"For work in the understanding of atomic physics and the formulation of exclusion principle."	
1956	Matteucci Medal	(Italy) Accademia dei XL	—	
1958	Max Planck Medal	(West Germany) German Physical Society	—	

== Publications ==
- Pauli W, General Principles of Quantum Mechanics, Springer, 1980.
- Pauli W, Lectures on Physics, 6 vols, Dover, 2000.
  Vol 1: Electrodynamics
  Vol 2: Optics and the Theory of Electrons
  Vol 3: Thermodynamics and the Kinetic Theory of Gases
  Vol 4: Statistical Mechanics
  Vol 5: Wave Mechanics
  Vol 6: Selected Topics in Field Quantization
- Pauli W, Meson Theory of Nuclear Forces, 2nd ed, Interscience Publishers, 1948.
- Pauli W, Theory of Relativity, Dover, 1981.
- Pauli, Wolfgang; Jung, C. G. (1955). The Interpretation of Nature and the Psyche. Ishi Press. ISBN 978-4-87187-713-8.
- Pauli, Wolfgang; Jung, C. G. (2001). C. A. Meier (ed.). Atom and Archetype, The Pauli/Jung Letters, 1932–1958. Princeton, NJ: Princeton University Press. ISBN 978-0-691012-07-0.

== See also ==
- List of Jewish Nobel laureates
