= John M. Blatt =

Austrian-born American theoretical physicist

John Markus Blatt
- Born: November 23, 1921; Vienna
- Died: March 16, 1990 (aged 68); Haifa
- Citizenship: American
- Scientific career
- Fields: Physics

John Markus Blatt (23 November 1921, Vienna – 16 March 1990, Haifa) was an Austrian-born American theoretical physicist.

== Life ==
Blatt was the son of a successful physician in Vienna. In 1938 the family immigrated to the US as Jews fleeing the Anschluss. Blatt studied physics at the University of Cincinnati with bachelor's degree in 1942 and received in 1946 two doctorates in physics, one from Cornell University and the other from Princeton University. He then went to Massachusetts Institute of Technology, where he wrote, with Victor Weisskopf, the textbook Theoretical Nuclear Physics, which became a standard introduction to the subject. From 1948 to 1953 Blatt was at the University of Illinois, where the Illiac computer was being built. Blatt was involved in the project and became a pioneer in the use of computers in theoretical nuclear physics. During the McCarthy era, he was dissatisfied with the political climate in the United States and immigrated to Australia, where in 1953 he joined the faculty of the University of Sydney. There, in collaboration with Max Robert Schafroth (1923–1959) and Stuart Thomas Butler, he developed a theory that explained superconductivity as a Bose-Einstein condensation of electron pairs.

Blatt, Butler, and Schafroth rejected BCS for a number of years, offering an alternative in the summer of 1957. This "quasi-chemical approach" expanded on Schafroth's earlier theory of superconductivity as a Bose-Einstein condensation of pairs of electrons.

Together with Takeo Matsubara, Blatt later proved that the quasi-chemical theory and the BCS theory were equivalent.

Blatt's energetic and argumentative personality led to conflict at the University of Sydney, so in 1959 he became a professor of applied mathematics at the newly founded University of New South Wales, where he remained until his retirement in 1984. During the 1960s he published Theory of Superconductivity (1964), two books on FORTRAN programming, and, in collaboration with S. B. Butler, two introductory physics textbooks. During his career at the University of New South Wales, he dealt with the three-body nuclear problem, statistical mechanics and applied mathematics such as the theory of optimal control. He brought a number of important mathematicians to the university such as George Szekeres and ensured that computer science teaching was expanded and students were trained early on computers. In the later part of his career, he worked on mathematical economics. He published over 100 articles.

Blatt was an accomplished amateur pianist.

== Selected publications ==
- with Weisskopf: Theoretical Nuclear Physics, Wiley 1952; reprint, Dover 1991
  - Theoretische Kernphysik, Leipzig, Teubner 1959 (German translation)
- Theory of Superconductivity, Academic Press 1964 ASIN B000OHKA2W
- with Lawrence Biedenharn: Angular distribution of scattering and reaction cross sections, Rev. Mod. Phys., vol. 24, 1952, pp. 258–272 doi:10.1103/RevModPhys.24.258 (This article has over 900 citations.)
- with Biedenharn and M. E. Rose: Some properties of Racah and associated coefficients, Rev. Mod. Phys., vol. 24, 1952, pp. 249–257 doi:10.1103/RevModPhys.24.249
- Introduction to FORTRAN IV programming, using the watfor compiler, Pacific Palisades, Goodyear Publ., 1968, 1971 ISBN 978-0876204382
- Basic FORTRAN IV programming (version IBM 360), Sydney 1969
- Dynamic economic systems: a post-Keynesian approach, Armonk, New York, M. E. Sharpe 1983 ISBN 0873322150
- with Ian Boyd: Investment confidence and business cycles, Springer 1988; Boyd, Ian; Blatt, John M. (6 December 2011). 2011 pbk reprint. ISBN 978-3642731204.
- with Stuart Thomas Butler: A modern introduction to physics, Sydney, Horwitz-Grahame 1960, 1965 ASIN B004HDYACK
  - volume 1 Mechanics of particles,
  - volume 2 Kinetic theory of matter and mechanics of solids

== Family ==
Blatt married Sylvia Epstein in 1945; they divorced in 1967. He married his second wife, Ruth Ne'eman, in 1971. He and his second wife retired to Haifa in 1984. He remained scientifically active there and taught at the University of Haifa. From his first marriage, he had four children, two of whom became computer scientists.
