= Friedrich Schütz =

Austrian journalist and writer (1844–1908)

- Born: 24 April 1844; Prague, Austrian Empire
- Died: 22 December 1908 (aged 64); Vienna, Austria-Hungary
- Occupations: Journalist; writer
- Relatives: Wolfgang Pauli (grandson)

Friedrich Schütz (24 April 1844 – 22 December 1908) was an Austrian journalist and writer.

== Biography ==
Schütz was born 24 April 1844 in Prague.

Schütz started his journalistic and literary career as Prague correspondent of the Neue Freie Presse. In 1873 he became editor of this newspaper.

He wrote Alte Mädchen, a comedy play that received some attention internationally.

Wolfgang Pauli, a famous physicist, was a grandson of Friedrich Schütz.

He died 22 December 1908 in Vienna.
