= Schaper =

Schaper is a German and Dutch surname. Notable people with it include:

- Edzard Schaper (1908–1984), German author
- Hermann Schaper (1911–2002), German SS officer and war criminal
- Robert N. Schaper (1922–2007), American evangelical theologian and seminary professor
- Rüdiger Schaper (born 1959), German journalist
- Susanne Schaper (born 1978), German politician
- W. Herbert Schaper (1914–1980), American inventor of board games and founder of W. H. Schaper Manufacturing Co..

== See also ==
- Michiel Schapers (born 1959), Dutch tennis player
- Schäfer/Schaefer/Schafer/Schaeffer etc., surname
- Schaap, surname
- Schaps, surname
- Schapira, surname
- Shapira, surname
- Shapiro, surname
