= Charles Enz =

Swiss theoretical physicist (1925–2019)

Charles Paul Enz (19 January 1925 – 25 August 2019) was a Swiss theoretical physicist, known for his long association with Wolfgang Pauli.

== Life and career ==
Enz was born on 19 January 1925. He studied at ETH Zurich, where he earned his Diplom in 1952 under Wolfgang Pauli.

Subsequently he was scientific assistant to Georg Busch at ETH in the field of solid state physics, and earned his doctorate there under Pauli in 1956. During the summer semester of 1956 and the winter semester of 1958/59, he was Pauli's assistant and presented his lectures.

From 1959 to 1961 he was at the Institute for Advanced Study in Princeton, New Jersey, United States. Beginning in 1961, he was full professor at the University of Neuchâtel, and from 1965 at the University of Geneva, where from 1977 he was chairman of the Physics department. He was a visiting professor at Cornell University in the U.S. during 1963–64, and at IBM Research – Zurich in 1970–71.

Enz was concerned among other things with solid state physics and with the history of physics. He was the editor of the 6-volume Pauli Lectures on Physics, and a co-editor of Pauli's collected works. He also wrote an essay on Pauli's scientific work, and a scientific biography of Pauli.

Enz was president of the Swiss Physical Society from 1975 to 1978. In 1986 he became a fellow of the American Physical Society.

Enz died on 25 August 2019, at the age of 94.

== Works ==
- Of Matter and Spirit: Selected Essays by Charles P. Enz. Singapore: World Scientific. 2009. ISBN 978-981-281-901-7.
- No Time to be Brief: A Scientific Biography of Wolfgang Pauli (revised ed.). Oxford. 2002. ISBN 0-19-856479-1.
