= Ronald P. Schaefer =

American linguist

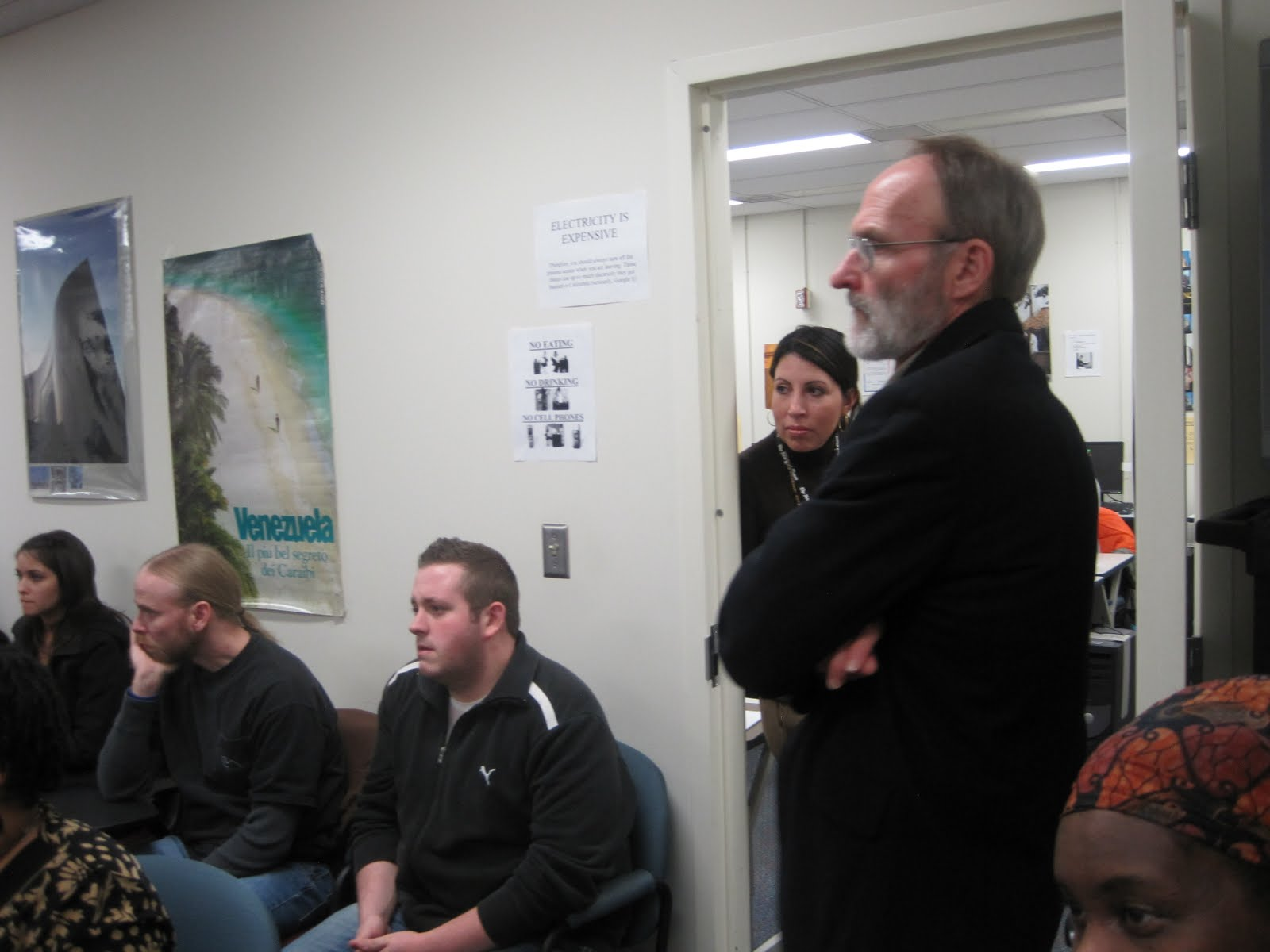
- Born: 17 June 1949; Minnesota, United States
- Education: University of Minnesota, Texas Tech, University of Kansas
- Occupations: Linguist, Professor, Scholar, teacher

Ronald P. Schaefer (born June 17, 1949), also known as Ron Schaefer, is an American academic, English professor, and linguist. He is the first person "to devise a written version of a language called Emai", a language reported in 1997 to be spoken by about 30,000 Emai people in Edo State of Nigeria. He has been described as one with "fevered intellect, the sharp chin, the untamable kineticism."

== Biography ==
Schaefer was born in Minnesota in 1949. From 1971 to 1973, he served as a Peace Corps volunteer in Afghanistan where he taught English language at Kabul University. Of the experience he said “What it did for me was open me up to the vast cultural currents that traversed Afghanistan over historical time. Alexander the Great and his armies had moved through. Genghis Khan had moved through. The great Mogul Empires had housed themselves there, and various other significant populations that I had read about in school. Now I was able to see the remnants of their buildings, their wells.”

== Work on Emai ==
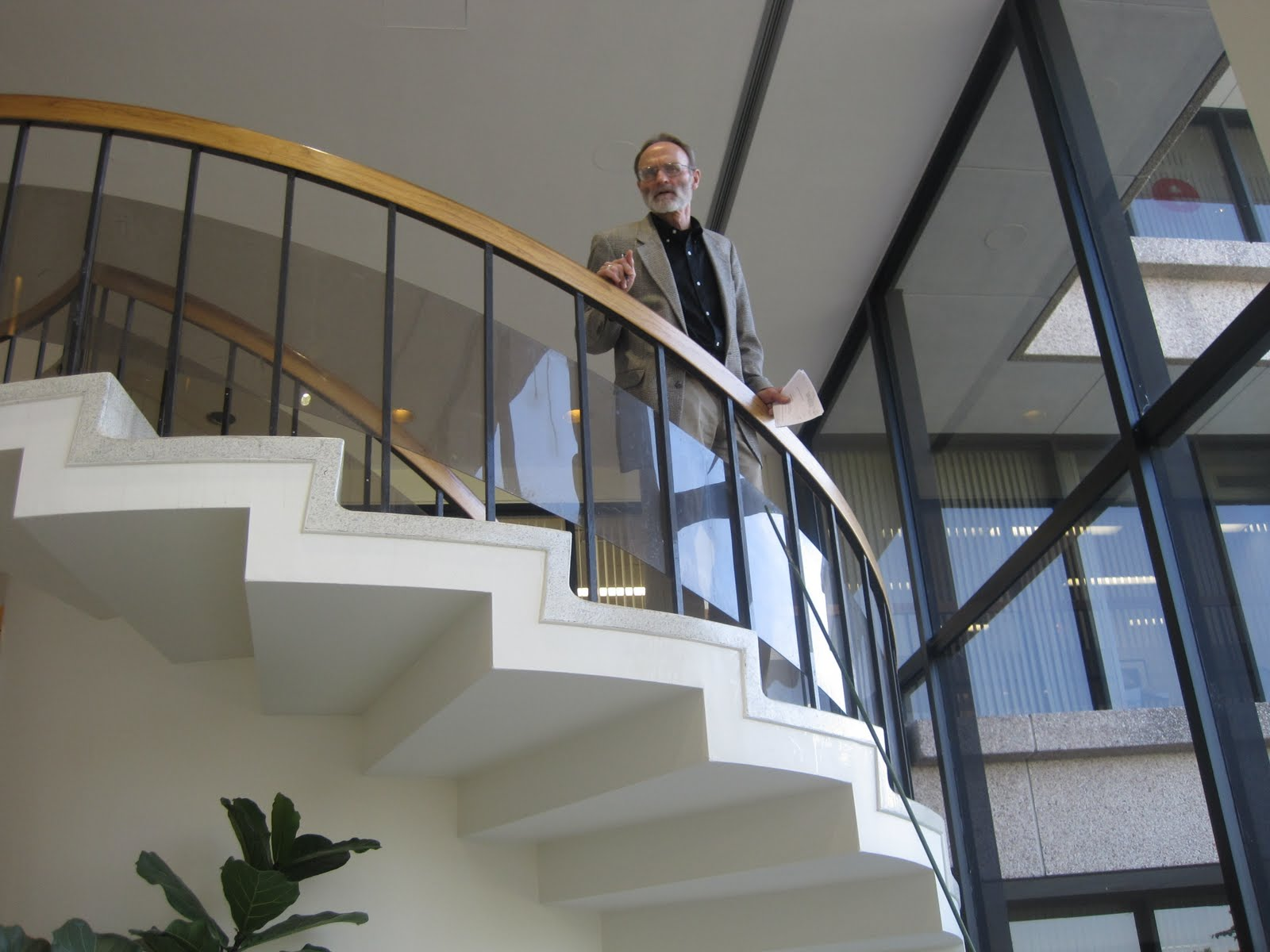
Ron Schaefer at Rendleman Hall, Southern Illinois University Edwardsville.

Between 1981 and 1985, he taught in the linguistics department at the University of Benin. It was there he discovered the language Emai, spoken by one of his students Francis Egbokhare. Emai is spoken about 60 miles from Benin, in the Afemmai Hills of Edo State. Schaefer had first planned to study all the languages of the region, but eventually relented. The motivation for his work on Emai, he said, was to prevent the language from going into extinction.

Schaefer and Egbokhare have worked together for over thirty years. With Egbokhare, he has produced "a 552 page dictionary of Emai, two volumes of oral tradition narratives running to 1,261 pages." Together, they have also published "over 35 books and essays in the space of 20 years."

== Work at Southern Illinois University ==
In 1986, he joined the faculty of Southern Illinois University Edwardsville and was promoted in 1990 to assistant professor, and later to full professor in 1995. In 2010, he was recognized as a Distinguished Research Professor.

He retired from Southern Illinois University Edwardsville in 2015.

== Notable publications ==
- A dictionary of Emai: an Edoid language of Nigeria -including a grammatical sketch (2007) with Francis Egbokhare
- Oral Tradition Narratives of the Emai People (1999)
- An Emai Myth‘ is from Ronald P. Schaefer and Francis O. Egbokhare (1999); Oral Tradition Narratives of the Emai People Part I (Research on African Languages and Cultures; Rüdiger Schott, ed.; Volume 5); Lit Verlag; Hamburg.
