= Christian Schäfer =

German politician (born 1985)

Member of the Landtag of Baden-Württemberg
- Incumbent
- Assumed office 11 May 2026

Personal details
- Born: 1985 (age 40–41)
- Party: Alternative for Germany

Christian Schäfer (born 1985) is a German politician who was elected member of the Landtag of Baden-Württemberg in 2026. He is a co-spokesperson of the Alternative for Germany in the Rhein-Neckar-Kreis.
