= Stripping reaction (physics) =

In nuclear physics, a stripping reaction is a nuclear reaction in which part of the incident nucleus combines with the target nucleus, and the remainder proceeds with most of its original momentum in almost its original direction. This reaction was first described by Stuart Thomas Butler in 1950.

A simple one-step stripping reaction can be represented as

A+a →B+b
A + (b+x)_{a}→(A+x)_{b}+b

where A represents the target core, b represents the projectile core, and x is the transferred mass which may represent any number of particles.

Deuteron stripping reactions (the Oppenheimer–Phillips process) have been extensively used to study nuclear reactions and structure, this occurs where the incident nucleus is a deuteron and only a proton emerges from the target nucleus.
