= Stuart Thomas Butler =

Australian nuclear physicist

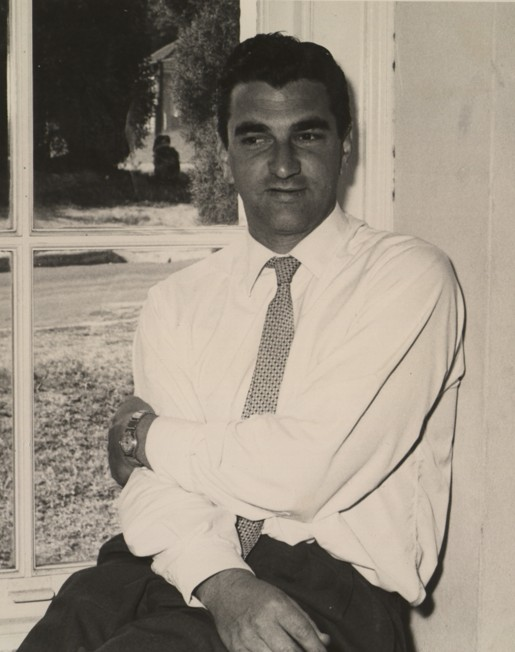
- Butler in 1957
- Born: July 4, 1926; Naracoorte, South Australia
- Died: May 15, 1982 (aged 55); Camperdown, New South Wales
- Education: University of Adelaide (B.Sc., 1945; B.Sc. Hons, 1947; M.Sc., 1948); University of Birmingham (Ph.D., 1951)
- Spouse: Miriam Stella Silver
- Children: 3
- Awards: Tom W. Bonner Prize (1977)
- Scientific career
- Fields: Theoretical Physics
- Workplaces: Cornell University; Australian National University; University of Sydney; Australian Atomic Energy Commission
- Doctoral advisor: Rudolph Peierls

Stuart Thomas Butler AAS (4 July 1926 – 15 May 1982) was an Australian nuclear physicist who served as Director of the Australian Atomic Energy Commission from 1977 until 1982, and was noted for his contributions to theoretical physics including stripping reactions, energy loss of particles in plasma and atmospheric tides induced by absorption of solar radiation in the ozone layer.

== Early life ==
Butler was born in Naracoorte in South Australia; he was the eldest of three sons born to his Welsh school teacher father and Australian mother. He attended Murray Bridge and Gumeracha primary schools and Birdwood High School where he showed aptitude in mathematics, science, English and music. When he completed high school he considered studying piano at the Conservatorium of Music, but he received a scholarship to do his undergraduate studies at the University of Adelaide, here he was greatly influenced by physicist Kerr Grant and mathematician Hans Schwerdtfeger. He completed his BSc in mathematics and physics in 1945, received first-class honours in 1946 and his MSc in 1947.

Butler was awarded a scholarship by the Australian National University to work in theoretical physics in the University of Birmingham. He arrived in Birmingham in 1949 and completed his PhD studies in 1951. At Birmingham he formed a close relationship with his thesis advisor, the famous physicist Rudolf Peierls. While at Birmingham, Butler began his work on nuclear stripping reactions, he is recognized as the pioneer of this field and was awarded the Tom W. Bonner Prize in Nuclear Physics for his work in this area.

== Career ==
After completing his PhD Butler took a research position at Cornell University, then returned to Australia in 1953 to a research fellowship at the Australian National University and in 1954 took a position at the University of Sydney where he went on to head the Faculty of Science from 1970 to 1973. During his time at the University of Sydney, Butler continued his research on stripping reactions, and also studies energy loss of particles in a plasma, superconductivity and atmospheric tides induced by absorption of solar radiation in the ozone layer; for these contributions he was awarded the Thomas Ranken Lyle Medal from the Australian Academy of Science and a DSc from the Australian National University.

In 1977 Butler was appointed Director of the Australian Atomic Energy Commission Research Establishment in Lucas Heights. He was still engaged in this position when he died in 1982.

== Selected publications ==
- Butler, S. T. (1950). "On Angular Distributions from (d,p) and(d,n) Nuclear Reactions". Physical Review. 80 (6): 1095–1096. Bibcode:1950PhRv...80R1095B. doi:10.1103/PhysRev.80.1095.2.
- Butler, S. T.; Symonds, J. L. (1951). "Angular Distributions for (d,p) and (d,n) Reactions in Light Nuclei". Physical Review. 83 (4): 858. Bibcode:1951PhRv...83..858B. doi:10.1103/PhysRev.83.858.
- Blatt, J. M.; Butler, S. T. (1955). "Superfluidity of an Ideal Bose-Einstein Gas". Physical Review. 100 (2): 476–480. Bibcode:1955PhRv..100..476B. doi:10.1103/PhysRev.100.476.
- Butler, S. T.; Pearson, C. A. (1961). "Deuterons from High-Energy Proton Bombardment of Matter". Physical Review Letters. 7 (2): 69–71. Bibcode:1961PhRvL...7...69B. doi:10.1103/PhysRevLett.7.69.
- Butler, S. T.; Pearson, C. A. (1963). "Deuterons from High-Energy Proton Bombardment of Matter". Physical Review. 129 (2): 836–842. Bibcode:1963PhRv..129..836B. doi:10.1103/PhysRev.129.836.
- Butler, S.T; Hewitt, R.G.L; McKellar, B.H.J; May, R.M (1967). "Deuteron stripping analysis". Annals of Physics. 43 (2): 282–321. Bibcode:1967AnPhy..43..282B. doi:10.1016/0003-4916(67)90153-4.
