= Laura K. Schaefer =

American planetary scientist

Laura K. Schaefer is an American planetary scientist whose research concerns the atmospheres and atmosphere formation of exoplanets, and the effect of asteroid impacts on the formation of the Earth's atmosphere. She is an assistant professor of geological sciences at Stanford University.

== Education and career ==
Schaefer majored in earth and planetary sciences at Washington University in St. Louis, where she earned a bachelor's degree in 2002. She continued to work at Washington University until 2011, when she became a graduate student in astronomy at Harvard University. She completed her Ph.D. in 2016, under the supervision of Dimitar Sasselov; her dissertation was The Atmosphere-Interior Connection: Rocky Planets as Linked Chemical Systems.

After postdoctoral research at Arizona State University, she joined Stanford University as an assistant professor of geological sciences in 2019.
