= Wolf Schäfer =

German-American historian and academic

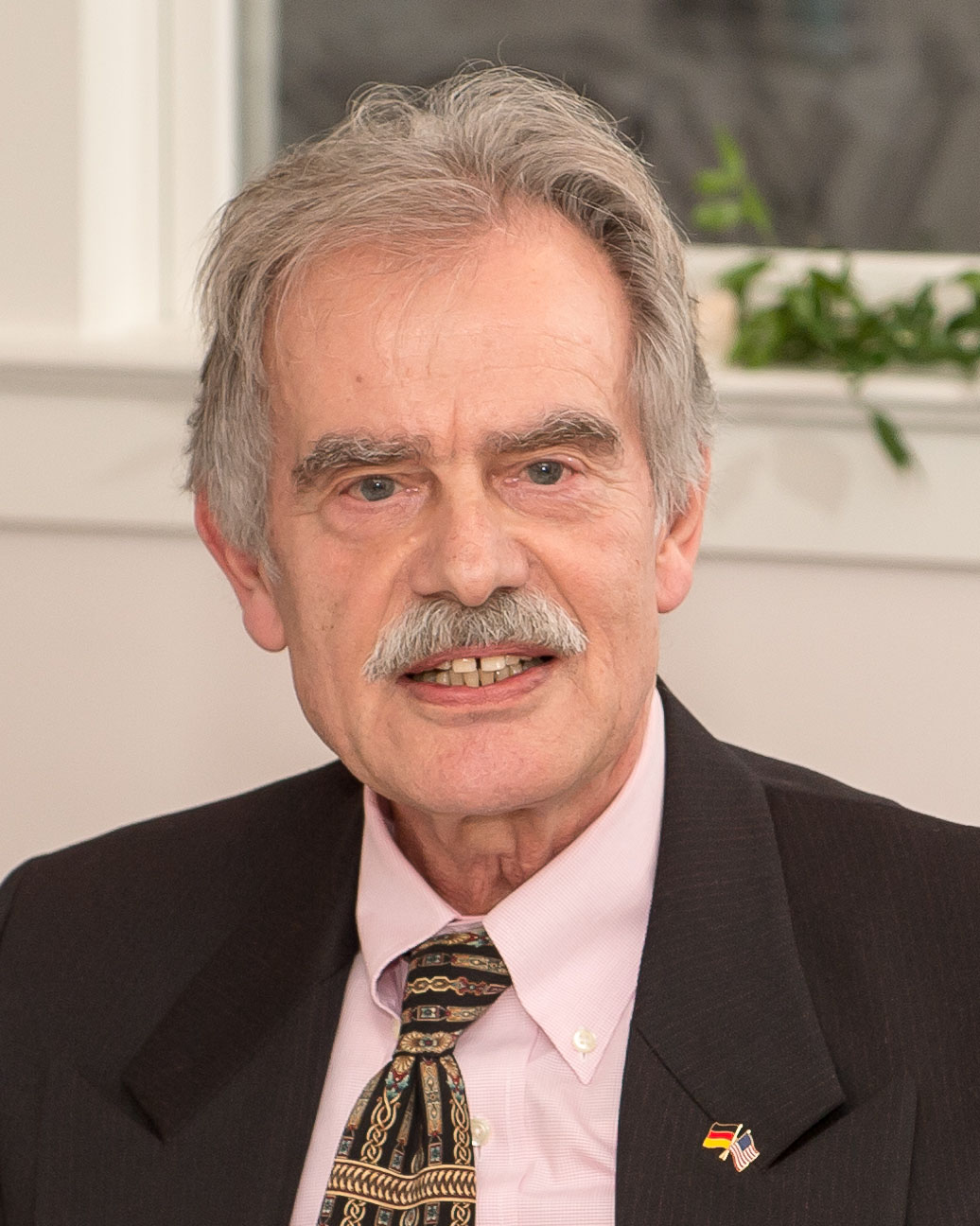
Wolf Schäfer, 2014

Wolf Schäfer (born 1942, in Halle) is a German-American historian. He is known for his work on science studies, early socialism, and global history.

== Academic career ==
Schäfer studied history, politics, and philosophy at Marburg University, the University of Bonn, King's College London, and LMU Munich. He earned his doctorate from the University of Bremen in 1983 with a cumulative thesis on modern social history and the history of science which was published in 1985 under the title Die unvertraute Moderne (The unfamiliar modern age).

From 1973 to 1981, he worked in the interdisciplinary science studies group at the Max Planck Institute for the Study of Living Conditions in the Scientific and Technical World under the direction of Carl Friedrich von Weizsäcker.

From 1989 to 2016, he taught at State University of New York at Stony Brook, first in the Department of History, then in the Department of Technology and Society, which he chaired from 2017 to 2022. He founded the university's Automotive Ethics Laboratory and held additional administrative roles, including Associate and Interim Dean for International Academic Programs.

== Work ==
=== Finalization theory ===
Schäfer was part of a group that developed the theory of the finalization of science, which proposed that scientific research may, under certain conditions, follow external societal goals. This model, based on concepts from Thomas Kuhn and Imre Lakatos, became the focus of an intense debate in West Germany in the 1970s. Critics considered the theory an ideological distortion of science, while proponents, including Schäfer, defended its relevance for science policy.

His contributions to this discourse, including a case study on Justus von Liebig's agricultural chemistry, were noted for combining theoretical insight with historical documentation. Commentators such as Helga Nowotny described Schäfer's polemics as unusually sharp and original for German academia.

=== Social history and early socialism ===
In the field of 19th-century social history, Schäfer's work focused on Wilhelm Weitling, a self-educated tailor and early socialist. Schäfer contrasted Weitling's "collective thinking from below" with the more theoretical socialism of Karl Marx, highlighting the suppression of popular voices in early socialist discourse. His perspective, published during the Cold War, was controversial in East Germany but gained recognition among Western scholars.

=== Global history ===
Schäfer contributed to global history as a conceptual alternative to traditional world history. He emphasized the importance of global integration after World War II as the beginning of a new epoch. In 2003, his paper "The New Global History: Toward a Narrative for Pangaea Two" was discussed by over twenty international scholars in the journal Erwägen, Wissen, Ethik.

Schäfer introduced the term "Pangaea Two" to describe the emergence of a planetary technoscientific civilization. His approach has been reviewed and discussed by other scholars, including Fred Spier in his 1996 review of Conceptualizing Global History and Saïd Amir Arjomand, who edited the volume Social Theory and Regional Studies in the Global Age (2014), which includes contributions expanding on Schäfer's ideas.

=== Technology and ethics ===
Since 2019, Schäfer has worked on the ethics of autonomous vehicles. His lab simulates moral dilemmas in traffic scenarios, comparing how different ethical frameworks (utilitarian, deontological, libertarian) guide AI-based decision-making.

=== Work on Carl Friedrich von Weizsäcker ===
Schäfer also published studies on Carl Friedrich von Weizsäcker's involvement in the Nazi-era nuclear program and his later intellectual partnership with Martin Heidegger. His essay in Leviathan examined Weizsäcker's legacy as physicist and contributor to the German nuclear bomb project during the Second World War.

== Selected publications ==
- Krohn, Wolfgang; Schäfer, Wolf. Ursprung und Struktur der Agrikulturchemie. In: Starnberger Studien 1, Suhrkamp, 1978.
- Collective Thinking From Below. In: Dialectical Anthropology, vol. 6, 1981.
- Schäfer, Wolf (ed.). Finalization in Science. Dordrecht: Springer, 1983. ISBN 9789027715494.
- Die unvertraute Moderne. Frankfurt: Fischer Wissenschaft, 1985. ISBN 9783596273560.
- Ungleichzeitigkeit als Ideologie. Frankfurt: Fischer Sozialwissenschaft, 1994. ISBN 9783596119271.
- The New Global History: Toward a Narrative for Pangaea Two. In: Erwägen Wissen Ethik, vol. 14, no. 1, 2003.
- Plutoniumbombe und zivile Atomkraft. In: Leviathan, vol. 41, no. 3, 2013.
- Der „utopische" Nationalsozialismus – Ein gemeinsamer Fluchtpunkt im Denken von Martin Heidegger und Carl Friedrich von Weizsäcker?. In: Carl Friedrich von Weizsäcker: Physik, Philosophie, Friedensforschung (Acta Historica Leopoldina, vol. 63). Ed. by Klaus Hentschel and Dieter Hoffmann, Stuttgart, Wissenschaftliche Verlagsgesellschaft, 2014.
- Pangaea II: The Project of the Global Age. In: Lim, H.-C.; Schäfer, W.; Hwang, S.-M. (eds.): Global Challenges in Asia, Seoul: SNU Press, 2014.
- Schäfer, Wolf. AV Ethics and the Plurality of Moral Theories, Stony Brook University, 2023.

== Awards ==
- SEL Endowed Professorship, TU Darmstadt (1991–92)
- Berlin Prize, American Academy in Berlin (2013)
- Dean's Award, College of Engineering and Applied Sciences, Stony Brook (2020)
