= Stripping reaction (chemistry) =

In chemistry, a stripping reaction is a chemical process, studied in a molecular beam, in which the reaction products are scattered forward with respect to the moving centre of mass of the system.
