= Salomon Kohn =

Salomon Kohn (8 March 1825, Prague – 6 November, 1904 Prague) was an Austrian novelist.

== Biography ==
He was the son of a Jewish merchant, and studied at the local university from 1844 to 1846. He then became partner in his father's business and was sole proprietor from 1863. After 1873, he devoted his entire time to literary work.

== Writings ==
His novel Gabriel was first published anonymously in a collection of works entitled Sippurim (Prague 1852), and had various translations, but, strangely, only obtained circulation in Germany in the English, the author's name being unknown and his right to the authorship not being proven till 20 years later. Of his other works should be cited Ein Spiegel der Gegenwart (A mirror of the present; Jena, 1875), Die silberne Hochzeit (The silver wedding; Leipzig, 1882), Prager Ghettobilder (Prague ghetto sketches; Leipzig, 1884); Neue Ghettobilder (New ghetto sketches; Leipzig, 1886), Der Lebensretter und andere Erzählungen (The life saver and other tales; Berlin, 1893), Fürstengunst (The pleasure of princes; Berlin, 1894), Ein deutscher Handelsherr (A German tradesman; Zürich, 1896), and Judith Löhrich (Strassburg, 1897).
